= List of railway stations in Cumbria =

This is a list of National Rail stations in the ceremonial county of Cumbria by 2017/2018 entries and exits, based on the UK Office of Rail and Road reports 2016-18.

== List ==
Rank	Station	Area served	Unitary authority	Operator	Line(s)	Platforms	Passenger usage 2016/17	Passenger usage 2017/18	Image
1	Carlisle	Carlisle	Cumberland	Avanti West Coast	West Coast Main Line, Glasgow South Western Line, Settle–Carlisle Line, Tyne Valley Line, and Cumbrian Coast Line	8	1,856,268	1,967,474	
2	Barrow-in-Furness	Barrow-in-Furness	Westmorland and Furness	Northern	Furness Line and Cumbrian Coast Line	3	653,310	652,246	
3	Oxenholme Lake District	Oxenholme	Westmorland and Furness	Avanti West Coast	West Coast Main Line and Lakes Line	3	571,180	581,309	
4	Penrith North Lakes	Penrith	Westmorland and Furness	Avanti West Coast	West Coast Main Line	3	547,208	565,660	
5	Windermere	Windermere	Westmorland and Furness	Northern	Lakes Line	1	415,448	421,658	
6	Ulverston	Ulverston	Westmorland and Furness	Northern	Furness Line	2	301,818	307,416	
7	Whitehaven	Whitehaven	Cumberland	Northern	Cumbrian Coast Line	2	250,792	231,926	
8	Kendal	Kendal	Westmorland and Furness	Northern	Lakes Line	1	204,026	208,698	
9	Sellafield	Sellafield nuclear site	Cumberland	Northern	Cumbrian Coast Line	2	199,818	206,094	
10	Millom	Millom	Cumberland	Northern	Cumbrian Coast Line	2	194,766	186,670	
11	Workington	Workington	Cumberland	Northern	Cumbrian Coast Line	2	186,576	183,198	
12	Grange-over-Sands	Grange-over-Sands	Westmorland and Furness	Northern	Furness Line	2	153,586	144,766	
13	Arnside	Arnside	Westmorland and Furness	Northern	Furness Line	2	110,610	103,176	
14	Maryport	Maryport	Cumberland	Northern	Cumbrian Coast Line	1	89,562	85,478	
15	Cark and Cartmel	Cark, Cartmel, Allithwaite, and Flookburgh	Westmorland and Furness	Northern	Furness Line	2	75,790	76,572	
16	Dalton	Dalton-in-Furness	Westmorland and Furness	Northern	Furness Line	2	76,690	73,378	
17	Askam	Askam-in-Furness and Ireleth	Westmorland and Furness	Northern	Cumbrian Coast Line	2	65,752	62,882	
18	Roose	Roose	Westmorland and Furness	Northern	Furness Line	2	58,492	61,716	
19	Appleby	Appleby-in-Westmorland	Westmorland and Furness	Northern	Settle–Carlisle Line	2	61,446	60,254	
20	Corkickle	Corkickle	Cumberland	Northern	Cumbrian Coast Line	1	45,852	50,422	
21	Wigton	Wigton	Cumberland	Northern	Cumbrian Coast Line	2	49,124	46,900	
22	St Bees	St Bees	Cumberland	Northern	Cumbrian Coast Line	2	51,114	46,734	
23	Staveley	Staveley	Westmorland and Furness	Northern	Lakes Line	1	42,378	40,920	
24	Seascale	Seascale	Cumberland	Northern	Cumbrian Coast Line	2	40,464	37,034	
25	Ravenglass	Ravenglass	Cumberland	Northern	Cumbrian Coast Line	2	32,638	31,930	
26	Kirkby Stephen	Kirkby Stephen	Westmorland and Furness	Northern	Settle–Carlisle Line	2	19,962	30,150	
27	Kents Bank	Kents Bank	Westmorland and Furness	Northern	Furness Line	2	28,262	28,358	
28	Harrington	Harrington	Cumberland	Northern	Cumbrian Coast Line	2	30,262	27,776	
29	Wetheral	Wetheral and Great Corby	Cumberland	Northern	Tyne Valley Line	2	22,872	25,894	
30	Foxfield	Foxfield and Broughton-in-Furness	Westmorland and Furness	Northern	Cumbrian Coast Line	2	24,604	22,680	
31	Aspatria	Aspatria	Cumberland	Northern	Cumbrian Coast Line	2	25,904	22,420	
32	Dalston	Dalston	Cumberland	Northern	Cumbrian Coast Line	2	22,180	21,556	
33	Brampton	Brampton	Cumberland	Northern	Tyne Valley Line	2	17,708	18,540	
34	Langwathby	Langwathby	Westmorland and Furness	Northern	Settle–Carlisle Line	2	4,132	18,166	
35	Burneside	Burneside	Westmorland and Furness	Northern	Lakes Line	1	14,260	18,048	
36	Garsdale	Garsdale Head, Hawes, and Sedbergh	Westmorland and Furness	Northern	Settle–Carlisle Line	2	12,520	15,984	
37	Kirkby-in-Furness	Kirkby-in-Furness	Westmorland and Furness	Northern	Cumbrian Coast Line	2	14,578	14,398	
38	Lazonby and Kirkoswald	Lazonby and Kirkoswald	Westmorland and Furness	Northern	Settle–Carlisle Line	2	4,150	11,222	
39	Bootle	Bootle, Eskmeals, and Hycemoor	Cumberland	Northern	Cumbrian Coast Line	2	11,850	10,870	
40	Drigg	Drigg and Holmrook	Cumberland	Northern	Cumbrian Coast Line	2	10,348	9,728	
41	Flimby	Flimby	Cumberland	Northern	Cumbrian Coast Line	2	11,678	9,442	
42	Dent	Dent and Cowgill	Westmorland and Furness	Northern	Settle–Carlisle Line	2	7,248	7,988	
43	Parton	Parton	Cumberland	Northern	Cumbrian Coast Line	2	7,396	7,426	
44	Armathwaite	Armathwaite	Westmorland and Furness	Northern	Settle–Carlisle Line	2	2,180	7,100	
45	Silecroft	Silecroft	Cumberland	Northern	Cumbrian Coast Line	2	8,104	7,030	
46	Green Road	The Green	Cumberland	Northern	Cumbrian Coast Line	2	6,982	6,504	
47	Braystones	Braystones and Beckermet	Cumberland	Northern	Cumbrian Coast Line	1	956	992	
48	Nethertown	Nethertown	Cumberland	Northern	Cumbrian Coast Line	1	412	536	

== See also ==
- List of United Kingdom railway stations
