= Lowside Quarter =

Civil parish in Cumbria, England

Coordinates: 54.455°N 3.548°W

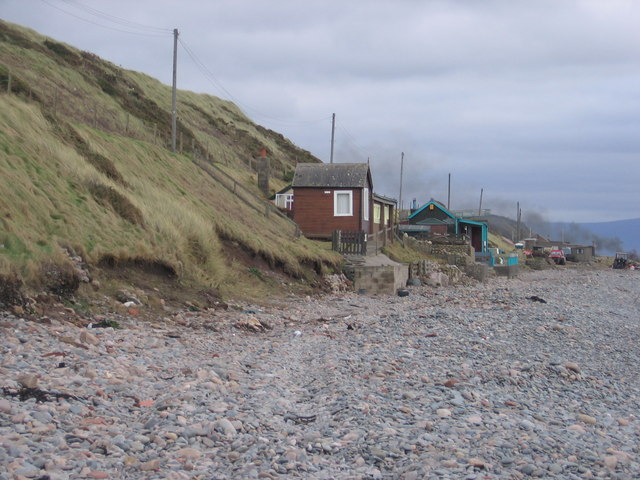
Bungalows between railway and beach at Braystones

Lowside Quarter is a civil parish in Cumberland, Cumbria, England. At the 2011 census it had a population of 583.

The parish has an area of 785.43 hectares (3.0326 sq mi). Its southwestern boundary is the coast, and it is bordered by the parishes of St Bees and Egremont to the north and Beckermet to the east. It has four main settlements, the hamlets or villages of Braystones, Coulderton, Middletown and Nethertown. The parish lies between the A595 road and the sea, and the B5345 goes through the parish. The Cumbrian Coast Line railway from Barrow-in-Furness to Whitehaven runs along the coast of the parish, with stations at Braystones and Nethertown.

There is a parish council, the lowest tier of local government.

== Listed buildings ==
There is one listed building in the parish: Braystones Tower, erected in 1897 at Braystones to commemorate Queen Victoria's diamond jubilee and later adapted as a war memorial, is grade II listed.
