= Nethertown railway station =

Railway station in Cumbria, England

Nethertown
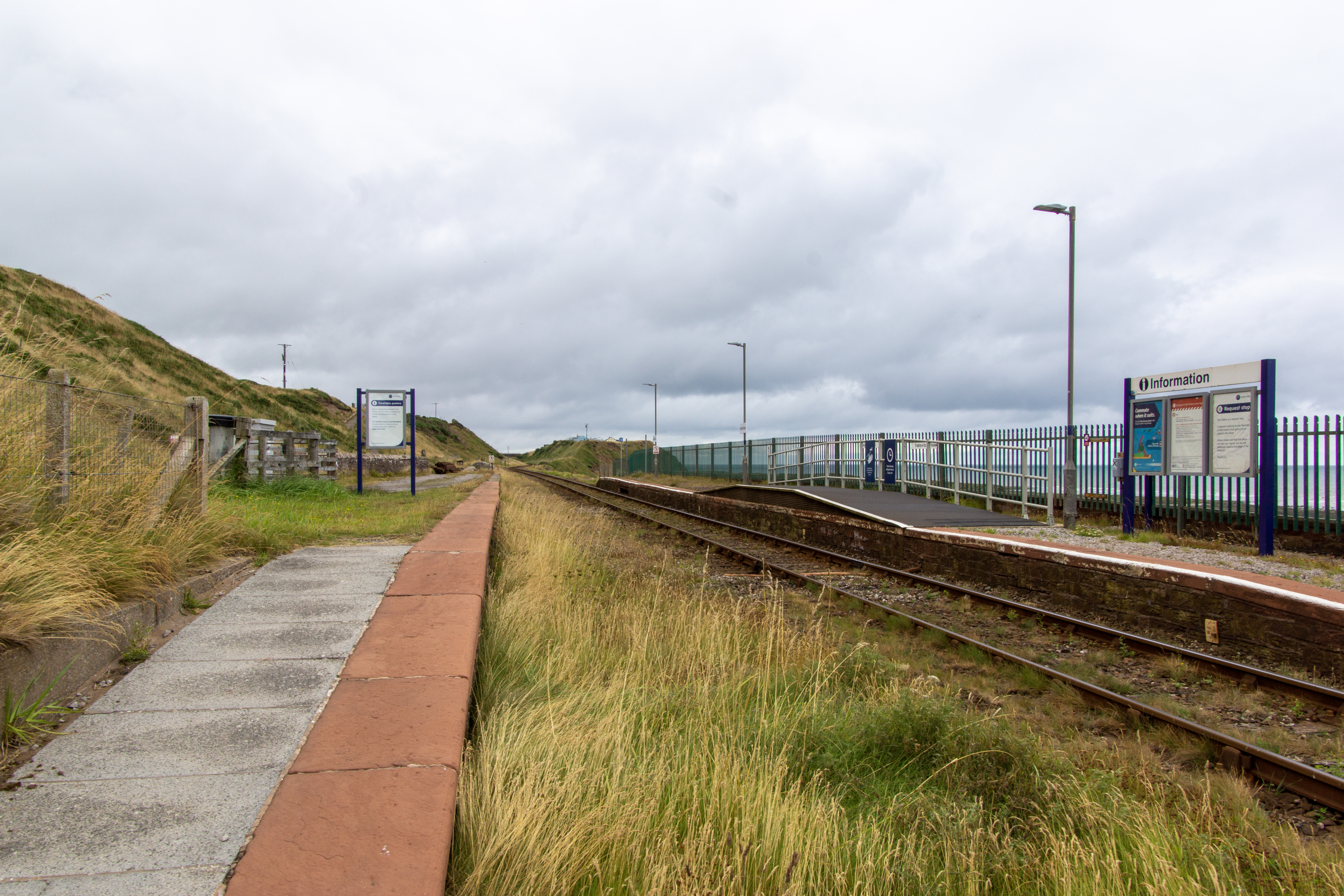

General information
- Location: Nethertown, Cumberland; England
- Coordinates: 54°27′22″N 3°33′56″W
- Grid reference: NX985079
- Owner: Network Rail
- Manager: Northern Trains
- Platforms: 1
- Tracks: 1

Other information
- Station code: NRT
- Classification: DfT category F2

History
- Original company: Whitehaven and Furness Junction Railway
- Pre-grouping: Furness Railway
- Post-grouping: London, Midland and Scottish Railway; British Rail (London Midland Region)

Key dates
- 19 July 1849: Opened

Passengers
- 2021/22: ▲1,412
- 2022/23: ▼960
- 2023/24: ▲1,030
- 2024/25: ▲1,334
- 2025/26: ▼1,062
Location
- Location within the former Borough of Copeland
Notes
- Passenger statistics from the Office of Rail and Road

Nethertown is a railway station on the Cumbrian Coast Line, which runs between Carlisle and Barrow-in-Furness. The station, situated 67 miles 35 chains (108.5 km) north of Carnforth (measured via Barrow-in-Furness), serves the village of Nethertown in Cumbria. It is owned by Network Rail and managed by Northern Trains. Nethertown is usually the least used station in Cumbria.

== History ==
The station was opened on 19 July 1849 by the Whitehaven and Furness Junction Railway when it opened the line between Whitehaven and Ravenglass.

The station was host to six LMS caravans from 1937 to 1939. The station was particularly busy with passenger traffic in the 1940s–50s when it served the Nethertown military camp, which was training anti-aircraft gunners. After the war, it was reused for construction workers building the Sellafield Nuclear plant.

During the 1970s, the passing loop was removed and southbound platform decommissioned.

As of August 2019, the only facility at the station is a passenger shelter on the single platform, but up until the early 1970s, the station had more substantial buildings as well as a signal box; while the station buildings are now in private use, the signal box has been removed.

== Location ==
The station is directly on the coast in a spectacular and remote position overlooking the Irish Sea from a small cliff. Pearson's 1992 railway guide is moved to comment, "The tiny halts at Braystones and Nethertown are as remote as anything British Rail has to offer....Nethertown station seems suspended between the cliff face and the sands".

Since 30 March 2021, the station has been on England's Coast Path with the opening of the St Bees to Silecroft section of the long-distance path.

== Facilities ==
A foot level crossing connects the platform to the station approach track, and though this offers step-free access, the platform is too low to allow level access from platform to the train. A Harrington hump has been installed to allow easier access on and off the train, the steps which were previously mounted on the platform have been removed. There is an old payphone in the shelter.

== Passenger volume ==
The station is the least used station in Cumbria, and one of the least used in the north west of England.

Passenger volume at Nethertown
| | 2004–05 | 2005–06 | 2006–07 | 2007–08 | 2008–09 | 2009–10 | 2010–11 | 2011–12 | 2012–13 | 2013–14 | 2014–15 | 2015–16 | 2016–17 | 2017–18 | 2018–19 | 2019–20 | 2020–21 | 2021–22 | 2022–23 | 2023–24 | 2024–25 |
|---|---|---|---|---|---|---|---|---|---|---|---|---|---|---|---|---|---|---|---|---|---|
| Entries and exits | 326 | 297 | 420 | 458 | 1,020 | 536 | 450 | 428 | 1,028 | 1,160 | 600 | 560 | 412 | 536 | 516 | 730 | 254 | 1,412 | 960 | 1,030 | 1,334 |

The statistics cover twelve month periods that start in April.

== Services ==
As of the May 2026 timetable, there are four northbound trains and five southbound trains on weekdays and Saturdays. There is a limited Sunday service of two trains northbound and three trains southbound. Due to ongoing engineering works, trains heading north terminate at Corkickle, rather than run through to Carlisle. A Sunday service was first introduced at the May 2018 timetable change.

| Preceding station | National Rail | Following station |
|---|---|---|
| St Bees | Northern Trains; Cumbrian Coast Line | Braystones |
| | Historical railways | |
| St Bees | Whitehaven and Furness Junction Railway | Braystones |

== Bibliography ==
- Caton, Peter (2018). Remote Stations. Leicestershire: Matador. ISBN 978-1-78901-408-2.
- Sim, Douglas (1995). 100 Years of St Bees. St Bees: St Bees Parish Council.
