= Cumbrian Coast Line =

Rail route in North West England

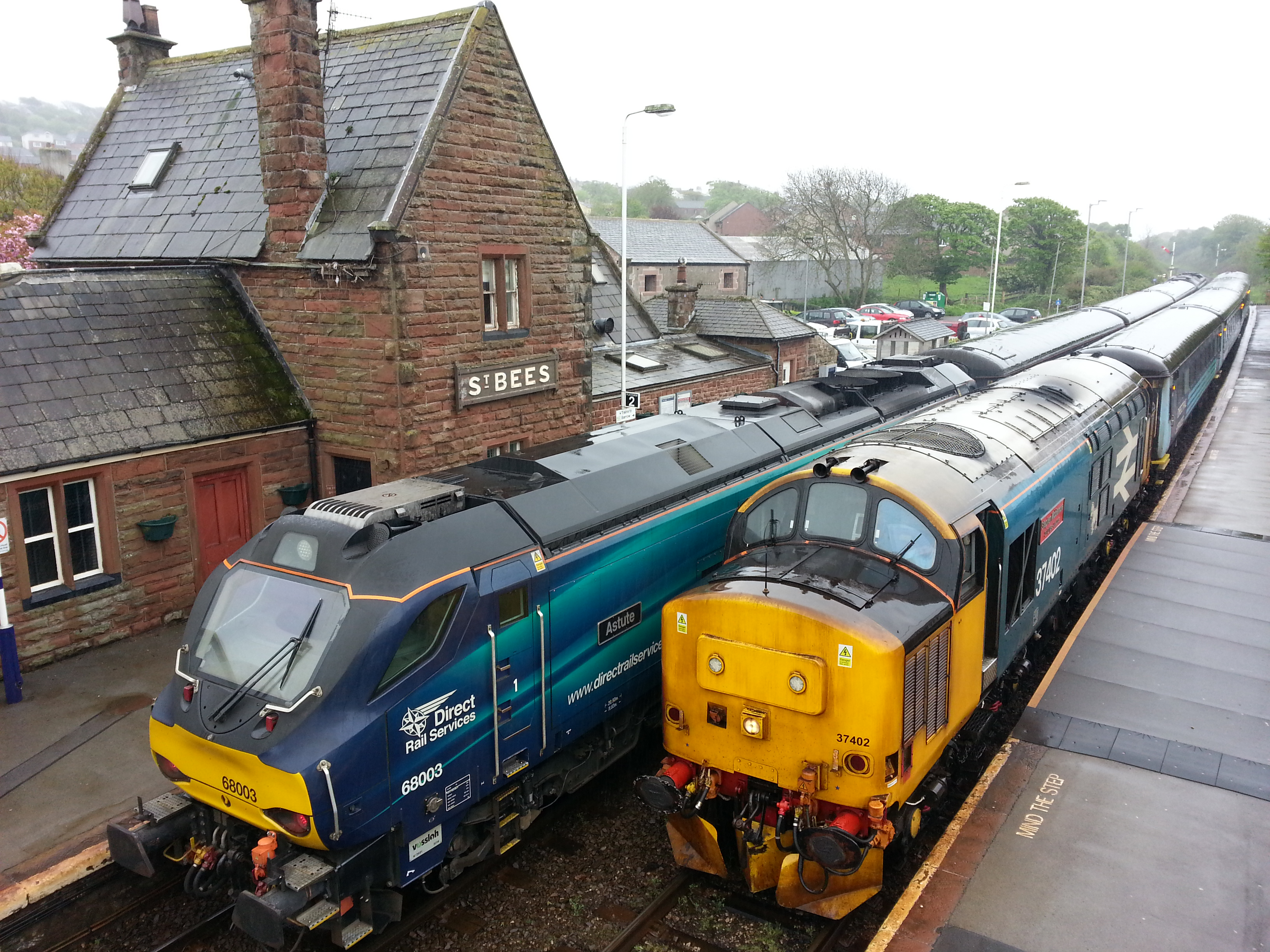
- A Direct Rail Services Class 68 alongside a Class 37, seen at St. Bees in May 2018.

Overview
- Status: Operational
- Owner: Network Rail
- Locale: Cumbria
- Termini: Carlisle; Barrow-in-Furness
- Stations: 26

Service
- Type: Heavy rail
- System: National Rail
- Operator(s): Northern Trains
- Rolling stock: Class 156; Class 195

History
- Opened: 1844

Technical
- Line length: 85.5 mi (137.6 km)
- Number of tracks: 2 (three sections of single track)
- Track gauge: 4 ft 8 1/2 in (1,435 mm)
Route map
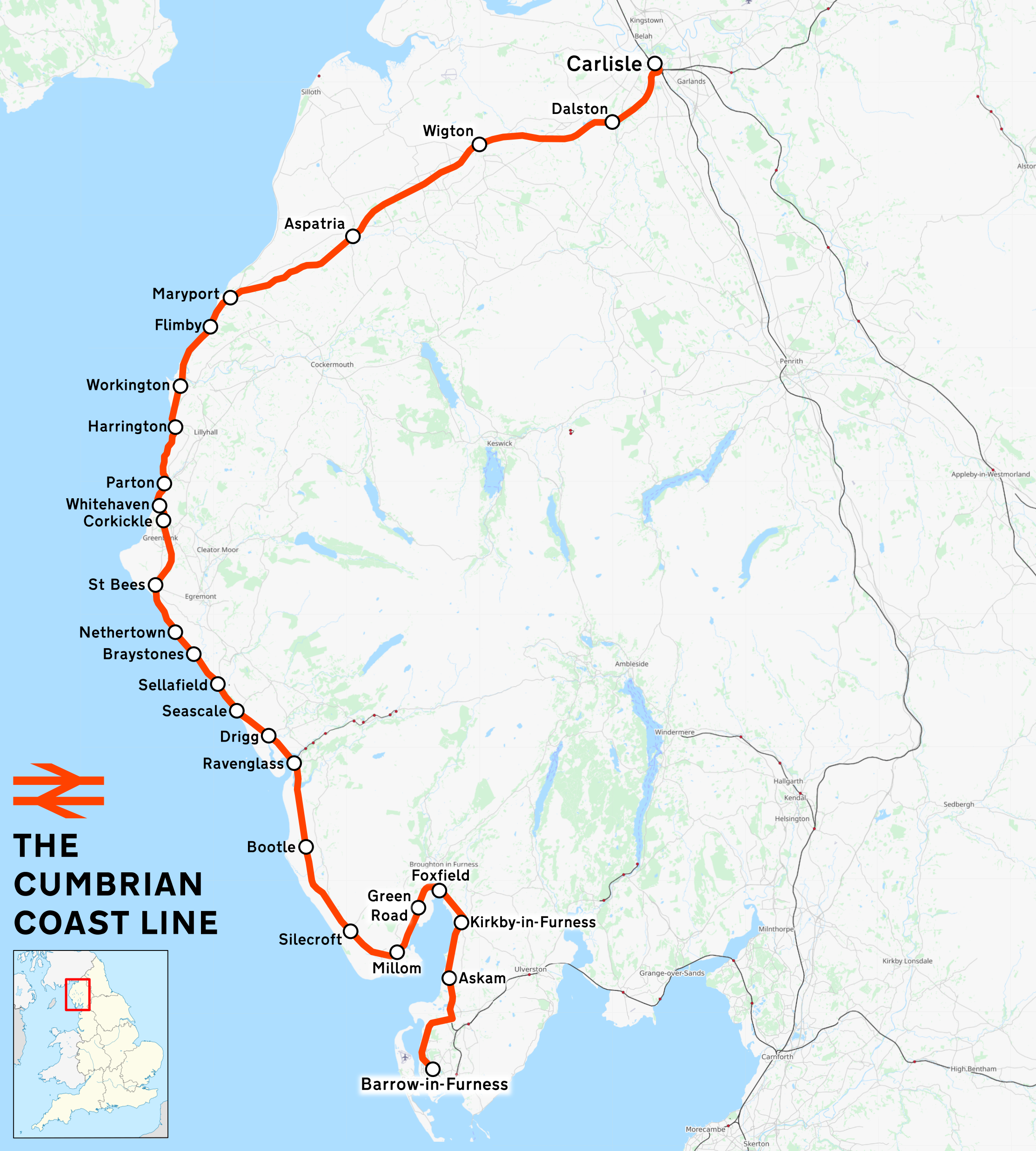

The Cumbrian Coast Line is a rail route in North West England, running from Carlisle to Barrow-in-Furness via Workington and Whitehaven. The line forms part of Network Rail route NW 4033, which continues (as the Furness line) via Ulverston and Grange-over-Sands to Carnforth, where it connects with the West Coast Main Line.

== History ==
George Stephenson favoured, and carried out preliminary surveys for, a scheme to link England and Scotland by a railway running along the coast between Lancaster and Carlisle, but this 'Grand Caledonian Junction Railway' was never built, the direct route over Shap being preferred. Consequently, the line along the Cumbrian coast is the result of piecemeal railway building (largely to serve local needs) by a number of different companies:

=== Maryport and Carlisle Railway ===
Carlisle to Maryport

Promoted to link with Newcastle and Carlisle Railway to give "one complete and continuous line of communication from the German Ocean to the Irish Sea" and to open up the northern (inland) portion of West Cumbrian coalfield. The act of Parliament was the Maryport and Carlisle Railway Act 1837 (7 Will. 4 & 1 Vict. c. ci); first section – Maryport to Arkleby (just short of Aspatria) – opened 1840: line Maryport–Carlisle fully opened 1845. Originally laid single; doubled throughout (to accommodate heavy and profitable mineral traffic) by 1861. Remained independent (and highly profitable) until grouping.

=== Whitehaven Junction Railway ===
Maryport to Whitehaven (Bransty) (leased by London and North Western Railway (LNWR) 1865; amalgamated with LNWR 1866).

Whitehaven Junction Railway Act 1844
- Act of Parliament
- Parliament of the United Kingdom
- Long title: An Act for making a Railway from the Town and Port of Whitehaven to the Town and Port of Maryport in the County of Cumberland.
- Citation: 7 & 8 Vict. c. lxiv

Dates
- Royal assent: 4 July 1844

Whitehaven at this time was dominated by the Lowther family, and its head the Earl of Lonsdale. Attempts supported by William Lowther, 1st Earl of Lonsdale to promote a 'Whitehaven, Maryport and Carlisle Railway' in 1835, had lost out to the Maryport and Carlisle Railway. In 1844 a more limited project for a railway between Whitehaven and Maryport (supported by Lord Lonsdale and both MPs for West Cumberland) got its authorising act of Parliament, the Whitehaven Junction Railway Act 1844 (7 & 8 Vict. c. lxiv). The first Earl had died earlier in 1844, and it was his son, the second Earl, who became chairman of the company and remained so throughout its existence. The line was opened from Maryport to Workington at the end of November 1845, and to Harrington mid-May 1846 Between Whitehaven and Harrington the line ran between cliffs and the sea and landslips, rockfalls, and high tides made construction problematical. A train ran all the way from Maryport to Whitehaven on 19 February 1847, but the passengers left it at Harrington; the line opened for passenger traffic 18 March 1847.

Whitehaven and Furness Junction Railway (Whitehaven Extension and Kirksanton Deviation) Act 1846
- Act of Parliament
- Parliament of the United Kingdom
- Long title: An Act to enable the Whitehaven and Furness Junction Railway Company to make a Railway in deviation from their Line of Railway, and to construct an Extension thereof to a Point of Junction with the Whitehaven Junction Railway.
- Citation: 9 & 10 Vict. c. cccxx

Dates
- Royal assent: 3 August 1846

Whitehaven Junction Railway (Alteration and Extension) Act 1848
- Act of Parliament
- Parliament of the United Kingdom
- Long title: An Act to enable the Whitehaven Junction Railway Company to extend their Railway from the present Terminus thereof at Whitehaven to the Patent Slip Yard in Whitehaven, to make Branches to Whitehaven Harbour, to deviate the Line at Parton, and to alter, enlarge, and extend the Company's Stations, Railways, and Works; and for other Purposes.
- Citation: 11 & 12 Vict. c. lxxx

Dates
- Royal assent: 22 July 1848

Other legislation
- Relates to: Whitehaven Harbour Act 1708; Whitehaven Harbour Act 1711; Whitehaven Harbour Improvement Act 1739; Whitehaven Improvement Act 1816

Text of statute as originally enacted

Whitehaven Junction Railway Amendment Act 1848
- Act of Parliament
- Parliament of the United Kingdom
- Long title: An Act to enable the Whitehaven Junction Railway Company to raise a further Sum of Money; and to amend the Act relating to the said Railway.
- Citation: 11 & 12 Vict. c. xci

Dates
- Royal assent: 22 July 1848

Text of statute as originally enacted

Whitehaven Junction Railway (Increase of Capital) Act 1854
- Act of Parliament
- Parliament of the United Kingdom
- Long title: An Act to enable the Whitehaven Junction Railway Company to raise a further Sum of Money, and to amend the Acts relating to the said Railway.
- Citation: 17 & 18 Vict. c. xxiv

Dates
- Royal assent: 2 June 1854

Text of statute as originally enacted

Whitehaven Junction Railway (New Branches) Act 1858
- Act of Parliament
- Parliament of the United Kingdom
- Long title: An Act to enable the Whitehaven Junction Railway Company to construct new Branches, to widen their Line, to erect Shipping Places and other Works, to raise a further Sum of Money; and for other Purposes.
- Citation: 21 & 22 Vict. c. cxxvii

Dates
- Royal assent: 23 July 1858

Whitehaven Junction Railway (Station Enlargement) Act 1865
- Act of Parliament
- Parliament of the United Kingdom
- Long title: An Act to enable the Whitehaven Junction Railway Company to enlarge their Station Accommodation at Whitehaven; to raise a further Sum of Money; and for other Purposes.
- Citation: 28 & 29 Vict. c. lxviii

Dates
- Royal assent: 2 June 1865

In 1848 two acts of Parliament were obtained; the Whitehaven Junction Railway Amendment Act 1848 (11 & 12 Vict. c. xci) to authorise the raising of further capital to cover overspend on the construction of the existing line, and the Whitehaven Junction Railway (Alteration and Extension) Act 1848 (11 & 12 Vict. c. lxxx) to make the link with the Whitehaven and Furness Junction Railway (W&FJR) by an elevated railway running to the harbour and then along the harbour front. The harbour link was never built (the W&FJR deciding to proceed with their original intention of a tunnel) but lines were laid down to serve the North Pier. There were continuing difficulties with the sea walls on the Whitehaven-Harrington section, which were now described as of bad and inefficient design and executed in a worse and more objectionable manner; in 1851 the seawall was rebuilt at Harrington and Lowca at a cost of £6,000. However, when in January 1852 a storm badly damaged the seawall immediately north of Whitehaven station (the wall, the embankment behind it, and the railway track being completely destroyed for a length of about fifty yards,) the damaged section pre-dated the railway. A further storm in December 1852 caused more extensive damage, the repaired section being lost again as a consequence of failure of the old wall immediately north of it (there were further wash-outs at Lowca and Risehow), but services were resumed within a fortnight. The link to the WJR from the W&FJR was made (as originally intended) by a tunnel, completed at the end of September 1852; a joint working agreement with the W&FJR took effect at the start of 1854. In December 1855, Bransty station shut for goods business and the Preston Street station of the W&FJR became the WJR's goods station for Whitehaven.

In 1856, the company secretary was replaced after an audit suggested about £3,000 had gone missing (the loss was made good by 'the directors' – in fact Lord Lonsdale alone – from his own pocket), and the company engineer resigned because of the defective state of the engines and the inefficiency of previous repairs but the WJR was entering an era of prosperity (by 1864 it was declaring a dividend of 15%) largely because of a boom in haematite mining. It was reported that in 1856, the quantity of iron ore raised in the neighbourhood of Whitehaven was 259,167 tons. Of this 152,875 was shipped at Whitehaven, 65,675 sent away by rail, and 39,617 tons used at the iron works in the district. The destinations of the ore were as follows: Wales, 124,630 tons; Staffordshire 26,768 tons; Scotland 15,865 tons, Newcastle, Middlesbro &c, 51470 tons; and to France 817 tons.

London and North-western Railway (Whitehaven Railway Transfer) Act 1866
- Act of Parliament
- Parliament of the United Kingdom
- Long title: An Act for vesting the Undertaking of the Whitehaven Junction Railway Company in the London and North-western Railway Company; and for conferring upon the last-named Company Running Powers over a Portion of the Whitehaven and Furness Junction Railway; and for other Purposes.
- Citation: 29 & 30 Vict. c. cxc

Dates
- Royal assent: 16 July 1866

Text of statute as originally enacted

A branch to the wet dock at Maryport opened September 1859 and carried considerable traffic from collieries at Flimby; the line (hitherto single throughout) was widened from Maryport to Flimby (Note: apparently not so that 'up' and 'down' traffic had separate lines, but so that 'the coal traffic was worked independently of the passenger line': coal traffic had previously been conducted by a single 'coal engine' hauling 'specials' as timetabled traffic permitted) and doubled throughout by 1861. The original Railway Hotel at Bransty was bought for use as station buildings and offices for the two Whitehaven companies, the Cockermouth and Workington Railway's half-share of Workington station was bought out, and timber viaducts at Workington and Harrington were replaced, the Board of Trade objecting to the use of timber in the Harrington replacement, especially given the WJR's prosperity: "The continued use of this material in the present instance by the directors of a company ... whose receipts are ... £53 per mile per week is quite inexcusable." The WJR reached an agreement in 1864 with the Cockermouth and Workington to lease the C&WR, guaranteeing a 10% dividend to C&WR shareholders, but did not get parliamentary approval for the necessary bill, the Whitehaven, Cleator and Egremont Railway objecting that the lease would obstruct any movement of ore northwards except over the WJR The WJR then (June 1865) reached agreement with the London and North Western Railway (LNWR) for the LNWR to lease the WJR in perpetuity, paying 10% a year. (The LNWR reached a similar agreement with the Cockermouth and Workington, and the Furness Railway with the W&FJR); the London and North-western Railway (Whitehaven Railway Transfer) Act 1866 (29 & 30 Vict. c. cxc), making the amalgamation permanent, received its royal assent in July 1886. In the first six months of operation by the LNWR, the profit on the line was said to be 27% a year.

When the Whitehaven–Harrington section was first opened the Carlisle Journal – politically opposed to the Lowther interest – had criticised it : "Zig-zag, zig-zag, zig-zag, perpetually. No serpent wriggles in more contortions than the Whitehaven Junction Railway" and pointed out the horrors of an accident on such a corniche "The poor wretches who fill the train must either have their brains dashed out against the rocks at one side or be pitched head-foremost into the sea on the other" Train crew could never see far ahead, and there was always the possibility of a rockfall onto the track: even after the doubling of the line, the Board of Trade required a speed limit of 15 mph on the section. In 1860, whilst the section was still single-track, a heavy iron-ore train broke down on this section and a mistake by the station-master at Whitehaven led to a low-speed collision between a portion of the train being returned to Whitehaven and a passenger train advancing to push the failed train to Harrington. Sixteen passengers were injured, two seriously; the accident (together with another low-speed collision in 1862) was said to have cost the WJR about £20,000 in compensation alone, and the vulnerability of the WJR dividend to any further accident was one of the arguments adduced in support of the lease to the LNWR. (Note: In 1866, the LNWR paid nearly £120,000 in accident compensation, but this was under half a per-cent of their receipts from passenger traffic.)

=== Whitehaven and Furness Junction Railway ===
Whitehaven to Foxfield (leased by Furness Railway 1865, amalgamated 1866).

Whitehaven and Furness Junction Railway Act 1845
- Act of Parliament
- Parliament of the United Kingdom
- Long title: An Act for making a Railway from Whitehaven in the County of Cumberland to a Point of Junction with the Furness Railway in the Parish of Dalton in the County Palatine of Lancaster, to be called "The Whitehaven and Furness Junction Railway."
- Citation: 8 & 9 Vict. c. c

Dates
- Royal assent: 21 July 1845

Whitehaven and Furness Junction Railway (Whitehaven Extension and Kirksanton Deviation) Act 1846
- Act of Parliament
- Parliament of the United Kingdom
- Long title: An Act to enable the Whitehaven and Furness Junction Railway Company to make a Railway in deviation from their Line of Railway, and to construct an Extension thereof to a Point of Junction with the Whitehaven Junction Railway.
- Citation: 9 & 10 Vict. c. cccxx

Dates
- Royal assent: 3 August 1846

Whitehaven and Furness Junction Railway Amendment Act 1848
- Act of Parliament
- Parliament of the United Kingdom
- Long title: An Act to enable the Whitehaven and Furness Junction Railway Company to deviate or extend their Line of Railway from Silecroft to Foxfield, and to abandon a Portion of their Line between Silecroft and Ireleth; to make Branches to Whitehaven Harbour; and for other Purposes.
- Citation: 11 & 12 Vict. c. cxxviii
- Territorial extent: United Kingdom

Dates
- Royal assent: 14 August 1848
- Commencement: 14 August 1848 (Note: The Acts of Parliament (Commencement) Act 1793.)

Other legislation
- Relates to: Whitehaven Harbour Act 1708; Whitehaven Harbour Act 1711; Whitehaven Harbour Improvement Act 1739; Whitehaven Improvement Act 1816

Text of statute as originally enacted

Whitehaven and Furness Junction Railway Amendment Act 1853
- Act of Parliament
- Parliament of the United Kingdom
- Long title: An Act to enable the Whitehaven and Furness Junction Railway Company to make Branch Railways; and for other Purposes.
- Citation: 16 & 17 Vict. c. clxxi

Dates
- Royal assent: 4 August 1853

Other legislation
- Repealed by: Whitehaven and Furness Junction Railway Act 1857

Status: Repealed

Text of statute as originally enacted

Whitehaven and Furness Junction Railway Act 1857
- Act of Parliament
- Parliament of the United Kingdom
- Long title: An Act to enable the Whitehaven and Furness Junction Railway Company to raise additional Capital; and for other Purposes.
- Citation: 20 & 21 Vict. c. cxxii

Dates
- Royal assent: 10 August 1857

Other legislation
- Repeals/revokes: Whitehaven and Furness Junction Railway Amendment Act 1853

Text of statute as originally enacted

Whitehaven and Furness Junction Railway Act 1865
- Act of Parliament
- Parliament of the United Kingdom
- Long title: An Act to enable the Whitehaven and Furness Junction Railway Company to make Branches and other Works, and to extend their Railway from Millom in the County of Cumberland to join the Furness Railway in the Parish of Dalton in the County of Lancaster; to raise further Capital; and for other Purposes.
- Citation: 28 & 29 Vict. c. cxliii

Dates
- Royal assent: 29 June 1865

Text of statute as originally enacted

The first Earl of Lonsdale had supported the idea of a railway linking Whitehaven to Maryport, but had had no interest in building a railway south of Whitehaven, let alone one linking to the West Coast Main Line : however he died in 1844 and was succeeded by his son William Lowther, 2nd Earl of Lonsdale who supported the scheme and under his chairmanship the Whitehaven and Furness Junction Railway obtained its act of Parliament, the Whitehaven and Furness Junction Railway Act 1845 (8 & 9 Vict. c. c), in the next session of Parliament. and in 1846 a further act of Parliament, the Whitehaven and Furness Junction Railway (Whitehaven Extension and Kirksanton Deviation) Act 1846 (9 & 10 Vict. c. cccxx), for extension of the W&FJR to a junction with the WJR near the latter's Whitehaven station. There was little potential local traffic, and the hope was for the through traffic which would flow once the W&FJR was extended to a junction with the Lancaster and Carlisle Railway (L&CR) south of Carnforth. However a bill for that extension was rejected because of inconsistencies in its documentation (Note: The bill claimed the line crossed various roads by overbridges – the accompanying plans and sections showed level crossings. Joy talks of the W&FJRR intending a junction at Carnforth and not with the L&CR, but with the "Little" North Western Railway (i.e. something much like what was eventually built) but this is at odds with the notice given of their 1846 bills by both the W&FJR and the NWR.) and it was left to others to provide a link between Lancaster and Furness, and to Lord Lonsdale to nurse the company until better times arrived.

By 1847, the company was becoming concerned that remaining funds would be insufficient to tackle the remaining expensive engineering (the tunnel to reach the Whitehaven station of the WJR and a 2-km long viaduct across the Duddon estuary to join the Furness Railway near Kirkby Ireleth). (Note: the 'Railway Mania' had now passed, and great difficulty was anticipated in raising fresh capital – in 1848 it was estimated that of the 17,000 shares issued only about 11,000 were in the hands of solvent parties and the part-paid shares were said to be unsaleable.) In 1848 bills were brought forward to make the link with the WJR by an elevated railway running to the harbour and then along the harbour front and for abandoning the Duddon crossing to Kirkby Ireleth, the line instead turning back on itself to follow the west bank of the Duddon estuary upstream to a much shorter crossing to a junction with the Broughton-in-Furness branch of the Furness Railway at Foxfield.

The 16 km section of line from Mirehouse (2 km south of Whitehaven) to the River Calder, already used for construction traffic, was used to move coal to depots at Braystones and Sellafield in February 1849, marking its opening for goods traffic. The first passenger services between a temporary station at Preston Street (at the southern edge of Whitehaven) and Ravenglass followed an official opening on 21 July 1849. (Note: Locomotives and other rolling stock were man-hauled to Preston Street from the terminus of the WJR on moveable rails set down in the streets of Whitehaven – in the process a King Street jeweller had his foot trapped under a rail and his left leg nearly amputated by an engine outside his front door, later dying of his injuries – the account in Joy which has the accident occurring on 14 July, and on a link via the harbour clearly has problems. A further fatal accident soon followed; a train approaching Preston Street did not slow adequately, went clean through the railway premises and buried itself in a house beyond, killing a ten-year-old girl.) Bootle became the southern terminus of passenger services in July 1850: the last section between Bootle and Foxfield was opened for passenger services 1 November 1850 although trains carrying Lord Lonsdale and invited guests had travelled from Whitehaven to Broughton-in-Furness over the section on at least two previous occasions. The link to the WJR station at the north of the town was made (as originally intended) by a tunnel, completed at the end of September 1852. A tramway through the market place allowing goods waggons to be horse-drawn from Preston Street to the south end of the harbour, authorised by the Whitehaven and Furness Junction Railway Amendment Act 1853 (16 & 17 Vict. c. clxxi) was completed in 1854; a joint working agreement with the WJR took effect at the start of 1854. From December 1855 W&FJR passenger trains ran to the WJR station at Bransty; (Note: They had to reverse into it; the current through platform at the north end of the tunnel did not exist until the station was remodelled by the LNWR in 1874, and the original WJR platforms were virtually on Bransty Row.) Preston Street became the goods station for both lines and a passenger station was opened at Corkickle, immediately south of the tunnel. The goods portion of north-bound mixed trains was detached some distance from Corkickle and run into Preston Street under gravity.

The opening of the Whitehaven, Cleator and Egremont Railway brought considerable additional mineral traffic onto the W&FJR at its northern end: at the southern end, a through route southward from Whitehaven was finally achieved with the completion of the Ulverstone and Lancaster Railway in 1857, reflecting this an additional curve was laid down at the junction with the Furness Railway and W&FJR trains ran to Foxfield or Ulverston rather than Broughton. To facilitate the export of haematite southwards, in 1864 the W&JR (now paying a previously unheard-of 8% dividend) projected a direct crossing of the Duddon estuary (to eliminate the dog-leg through Foxfield) in competition with a similar proposal by the Furness Railway; disagreement with the Whitehaven, Cleator and Egremont as to who should build a line from the WC&ER at Egremont to the W&FJR at Sellafield was deferred by the W&FJR's charges being reduced, and both companies (temporarily) dropping their plans to build the line, subsequently agreeing to promote as a joint line. The W&FJR got its bill for the Duddon crossing, but then agreed to be leased by the Furness Railway for a guaranteed 8% a year.

=== Furness Railway ===
Foxfield to Barrow-in-Furness.

The Furness Railway was incorporated in 1844; it was promoted by the Duke of Buccleuch and Earl of Burlington (later Duke of Devonshire) to link iron ore mines (at Dalton-in-Furness) and slate mines (at Kirkby-in-Furness) with Barrow harbour. Opened between Barrow and Kirkby in 1846, extended to Broughton in Furness in 1848.

All the above constituents were absorbed into the London, Midland and Scottish Railway in 1923.

== Current passenger services ==
Train services are operated by Northern. Services stop at all stations (although many were request stops, they were made regular stops in 2024), with the exceptions of Nethertown and Braystones, which are served by four trains a day in each direction and Drigg, Bootle and Silecroft, which are not served by 1 train per day in each direction.

In the December 2022 – May 2023 timetable, the following trains operated on weekdays:

- Southbound – 24 trains per day
  - Carlisle to Barrow-in-Furness – 15 trains per day, of which 3 continue to Lancaster and 1 to Preston
  - Carlisle to Whitehaven – 4 trains per day
  - Maryport to Barrow-in-Furness – 1 train per day
  - Sellafield to Barrow-in-Furness – 1 train per day
  - Millom to Barrow-in-Furness – 3 trains per day
- Northbound – 26 trains per day
  - Barrow-in-Furness to Carlisle – 17 trains per day, of which 4 begin at Lancaster
  - Barrow-in-Furness to Millom – 2 trains per day, of which 1 begins at Lancaster
  - Barrow-in-Furness to Sellafield – 1 train per day
  - Whitehaven to Carlisle – 4 trains per day, of which 1 begins at Workington
  - Whitehaven to Maryport – 1 train per day

There are no trains after 21:30 each evening between Millom and Whitehaven, as this section is only open for 12 hours each day due to the high operating costs associated with the large number of signal boxes and staffed level crossings that are present. Services are slightly altered on Saturdays and on Sundays there are less trains.

A new Sunday service was introduced in the May 2018 timetable change over the section south of Whitehaven after the new Northern Rail franchise agreement came into effect in April 2016 – the old operator (Arriva Rail North Ltd) also running an additional six weekday trains each way as part of the 10-year agreement with the Department for Transport.

In the December 2022 – May 2023 timetable, the following trains operated on Sundays:

- Southbound – 14 trains per day
  - Carlisle to Barrow-in-Furness – 7 trains per day, of which 2 continue to Lancaster
  - Carlisle to Whitehaven – 4 trains per day
  - Maryport to Barrow-in-Furness – 1 train per day
  - Millom to Barrow-in-Furness – 2 trains per day
- Northbound – 13 trains per day
  - Barrow-in-Furness to Carlisle – 7 trains per day, of which 1 begins at Carnforth and 2 begin at Lancaster
  - Barrow-in-Furness to Millom – 3 trains per day
  - Whitehaven to Carlisle – 3 trains per day

At Carlisle the lines connects to the: West Coast Main Line; the Settle-Carlisle Line; the Tyne Valley Line; the Glasgow South Western Line; and the Caledonian Sleeper service. At Barrow, there are connections to the Furness Line.

== Passenger rolling stock ==
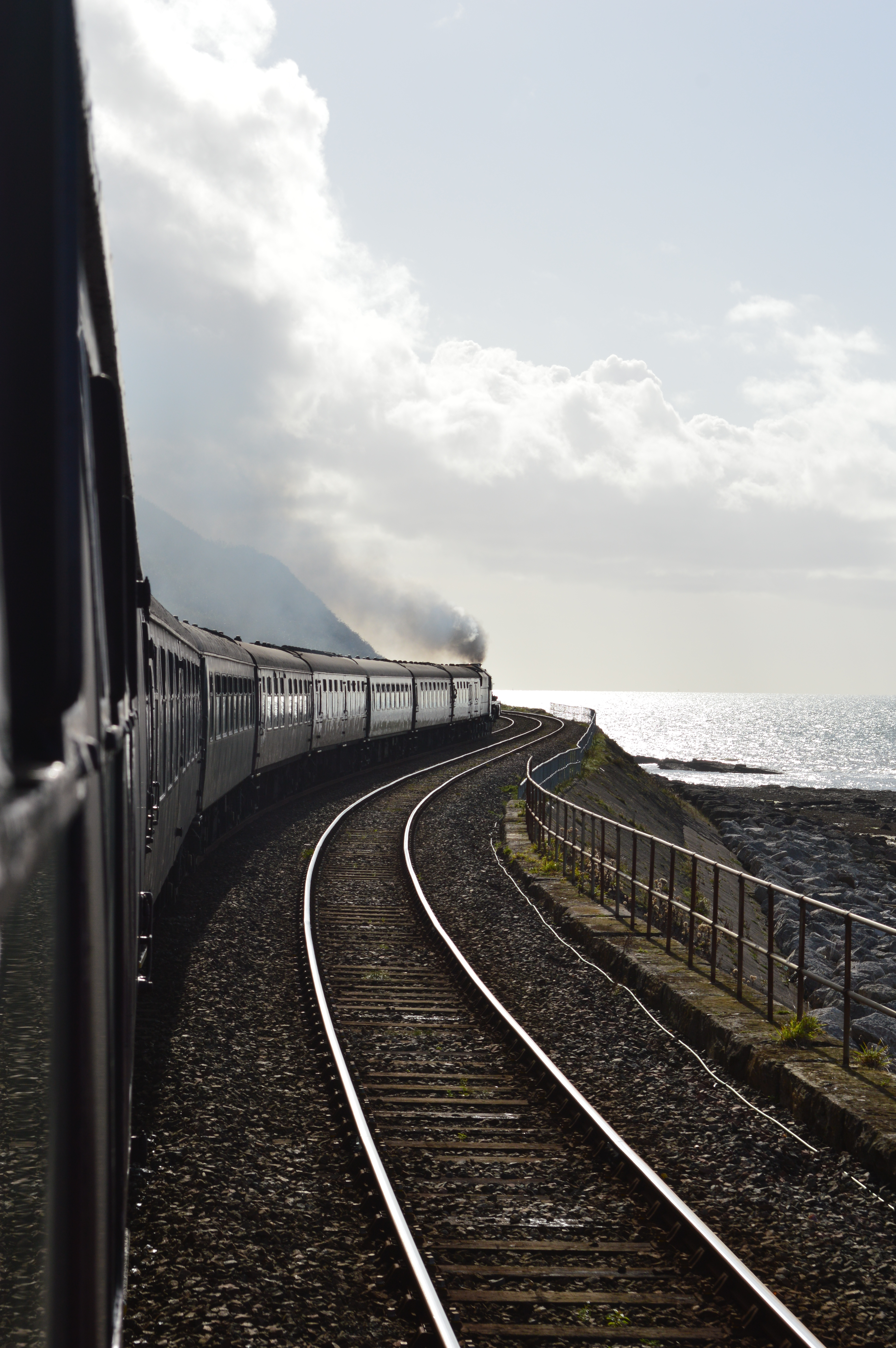
45690 Leander heading south down the Cumbrian Coast Line with a railtour from Carlisle

Due to restricted clearances on the section of line between Maryport and Carlisle, as several overbridges were built to narrower than normal dimensions by the M&CR, Class 150's, Class 158's, Class 195's and many other diesel multiple units are banned from the route because of their width. Services are therefore operated by Class 156 units. The line has also been previously operated by Class 142 Pacer units, but these have since been phased out in favour of Class 156 Sprinters cascaded from Abellio ScotRail. Class 153's have also previously worked along the route but these are now off lease from Northern being replaced by Class 156's.

In the past, the Class 108 first generation DMUs, formerly used on the line, were custom-fitted with bars on the drop-light windows for this reason. Since 2006, Network Rail have eased clearance restrictions so as to allow Mark 1, Mark 2 and Mark 3 coaching stock to operate along the full route, although under strict instructions that all drop-light windows must be either stewarded or locked between Maryport and Carlisle to prevent passengers from putting their heads out of the windows. This has allowed many charter services to operate the full length of the Cumbrian Coast. In the May 2015 timetable change, a number of scheduled services between Carlisle & Barrow were operated using Mark 2 coaches, a DBSO and Class 37 diesel locomotives hired in from Direct Rail Services to provide additional seating capacity – these were modified accordingly which included placing bars across the droplight windows. These workings reverted to DMU operation at the end of December 2018.

It is mandatory that passengers remain in their seats whenever steam tours travel between Maryport and Carlisle in both north and southbound directions; this is because most West Coast Railways Mark 1 coaches, which are used by charter companies, don't have bars across the droplight windows. Steam railtours using the route had, until recently, been banned because of the restricted clearances as well as the fear of injury to members of the public. The width of some steam engines prohibits them from working along the routes, steam locos which have travelled along the route in recent years include: LMS Black 5's, LMS 8F's, LMS Jubilee's & LMS Royal Scot's.

The Cumbrian Coast was given Community Rail status in 2008 and has an active Community Rail Partnership working hard to develop the route.

== Towns and villages along the route ==
- Carlisle
- Dalston
- Wigton
- Aspatria
- Maryport
- Flimby
- Workington
- Harrington
- Parton
- Whitehaven
- Corkickle
- St Bees
- Nethertown
- Braystones
- Sellafield
- Seascale
- Drigg
- Ravenglass
  - Connection for the Ravenglass and Eskdale Railway (La'al Ratty)
- Bootle
- Silecroft
- Millom
- Green Road
- Foxfield
- Kirkby-in-Furness
- Askam-in-Furness
- Barrow-in-Furness

== Route description ==
Network Rail's route NW 4033 runs for 114.3 mi (183.9 km) from Carnforth North Junction, near Carnforth, to Carlisle South Junction, near Carlisle, by way of Sellafield.

NW 4033	M-Ch	km
Carnforth North Junction	0-00	0.00
Carnforth	0-12	0.25
Carnforth Station Junction	0-19	0.40
Silverdale	3-36	5.55
Arnside	6-10	9.85
Grange-over-Sands	9-12	11.85
Kents Bank	11-08	14.75
Cark and Cartmel	13-29	21.50
Ulverston	19-09	30.75
Dalton	23-46	37.95
Dalton Junction	24-19	39.00
Roose	26-74	43.35
Salthouse Junction	27-38	44.20
Barrow-in-Furness	28-66	46.40
Park South Junction	32-57	52.65
Askam	34-64	56.00
Kirkby-in-Furness	38-00	61.15
Foxfield	40-21	64.80
Green Road	42-15	67.90
Millom	44-68	72.20
Silecroft	47-73	77.10
Bootle	53-18	85.65
Ravenglass	57-60	92.95
Drigg	59-59	96.15
Seascale	61-73	99.65
Sellafield	63-57	102.55
Braystones	65-57	105.75
Nethertown	67-13	108.10
St Bees	70-03	112.70
Corkickle	73-59	118.65
Whitehaven	74-47	120.05
Bransty Junction	74-54	120.15
Parton	75-79	122.30
Harrington	79-08	127.30
Workington	81-27	130.90
Workington North		
Flimby	85-00	136.80
Maryport	86-64	139.70
Aspatria	94-36	152.00
Wigton	102-63	165.40
Dalston	110-06	177.15
Currock Junction	113-37	182.60
Carlisle South Junction	114-19	183.85

=== 2009 floods ===
In the aftermath of the 2009 floods, an extra hourly service between Maryport and Workington operated stopping at all stations in between, including the temporary Workington North. These services were withdrawn in December 2010.

== Historical connecting lines ==
The following lines all previously connected to the Cumbrian Coast Line, but have mostly now been closed

- Silloth branch, from Aspatria
- Brigham branch, near Maryport
- Cleator and Workington Junction Railway, near Workington
- Cockermouth and Workington Railway, near Workington
- Whitehaven, Cleator and Egremont Railway, near Corkickle (this was the main connection: the Gilgarran branch of the WC&ER also connected at Parton).
- Cleator and Furness Railway, near Sellafield
- Ravenglass and Eskdale Railway, at Ravenglass. This is a narrow gauge railway which still runs services for tourists, but there was formerly a standard gauge line from Ravenglass to Murthwaite for freight.
- Vickers' Eskmeals Gun Range sidings branch, near Bootle. This was a standard gauge line used for the transportation of armament inside the range.
- Coniston Branch, near Foxfield
- Sandscale branch, at Barrow in Furness
