= Braystones railway station =

Railway station in Cumbria, England

Braystones
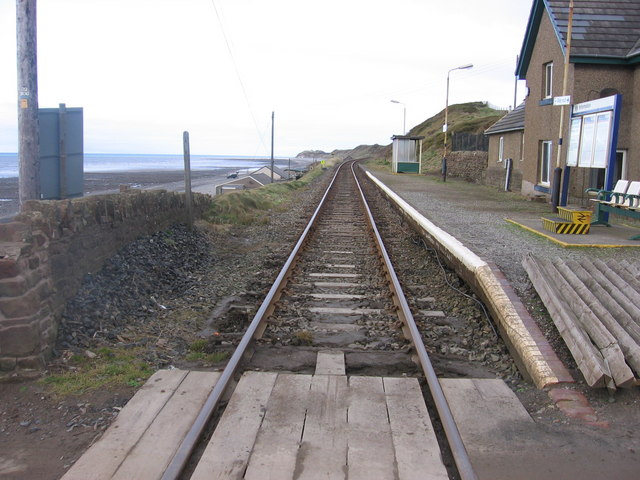
- The station seen in 2007

General information
- Location: Braystones, Cumberland; England
- Coordinates: 54°26′22″N 3°32′31″W
- Grid reference: NY000060
- Owner: Network Rail
- Manager: Northern Trains
- Platforms: 1
- Tracks: 1

Other information
- Station code: BYS
- Classification: DfT category F2

History
- Original company: Whitehaven and Furness Junction Railway
- Pre-grouping: Furness Railway
- Post-grouping: London, Midland and Scottish Railway; British Rail (London Midland Region)

Key dates
- 19 July 1849: Opened

Passengers
- 2021/22: ▲1,476
- 2022/23: ▼1,282
- 2023/24: ▲1,532
- 2024/25: ▼1,472
- 2025/26: ▼1,096
Location
- Location within the former Borough of Copeland
Notes
- Passenger statistics from the Office of Rail and Road

Braystones is a railway station on the Cumbrian Coast Line, which runs between Carlisle and Barrow-in-Furness. The station, which is situated 65 miles 76 chains (106.1 km) from Carnforth (measured via Barrow-in-Furness), serves the villages of Beckermet and Braystones in Cumbria. It is owned by Network Rail and managed by Northern Trains, and is located between Nethertown and Sellafield.

The station is unstaffed and is situated directly on the coast in a remote location. Pearson's 1992 railway guide is moved to comment, "The tiny halts at Braystones and Nethertown are as remote as anything British Rail has to offer...".

== History ==
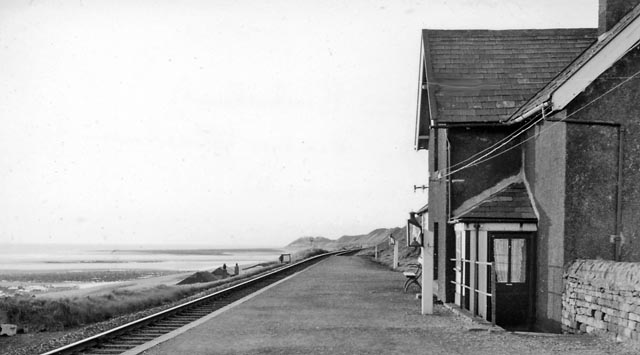
Looking north-west towards Whitehaven, as photographed in September 1961.

The Whitehaven and Furness Junction Railway was authorised in 1847 for a line which would link the town of Whitehaven with the Furness Railway at Broughton-in-Furness. It was opened in stages, and Braystones opened on 19 July 1849. The station was host to four LMS caravans from 1937 to 1939.

The station buildings still exist, but are in private ownership.

=== Accidents and incidents ===
On 4 July 1977, a tanker train derailed to the south of the station after passing over a bridge, with tankers demolishing two bungalows. No one was injured in the accident.

In September 2025, a train collided with a van at the station's level crossing. The driver of the van failed to see the approaching train and was banned from driving.

== Facilities ==
A bus-stop style shelter is provided on the single platform. There is a Harrington hump, due to the large step down from the train to the platform. There are no other facilities except a bench.

== Passenger volume ==
The station, alongside neighbouring Nethertown, are among the least used stations in north west England, and are the least used stations in Cumbria.

Passenger volume at Braystones
	2004–05	2005–06	2006–07	2007–08	2008–09	2009–10	2010–11	2011–12	2012–13	2013–14	2014–15	2015–16	2016–17	2017–18	2018–19	2019–20	2020–21	2021–22	2022–23	2023–24	2024–25
Entries and exits	1,679	966	706	876	1,096	1,964	1,970	966	1,046	620	892	1,028	956	992	1,036	1,374	354	1,476	1,282	1,532	1,472

The statistics cover twelve month periods that start in April.

== Services ==
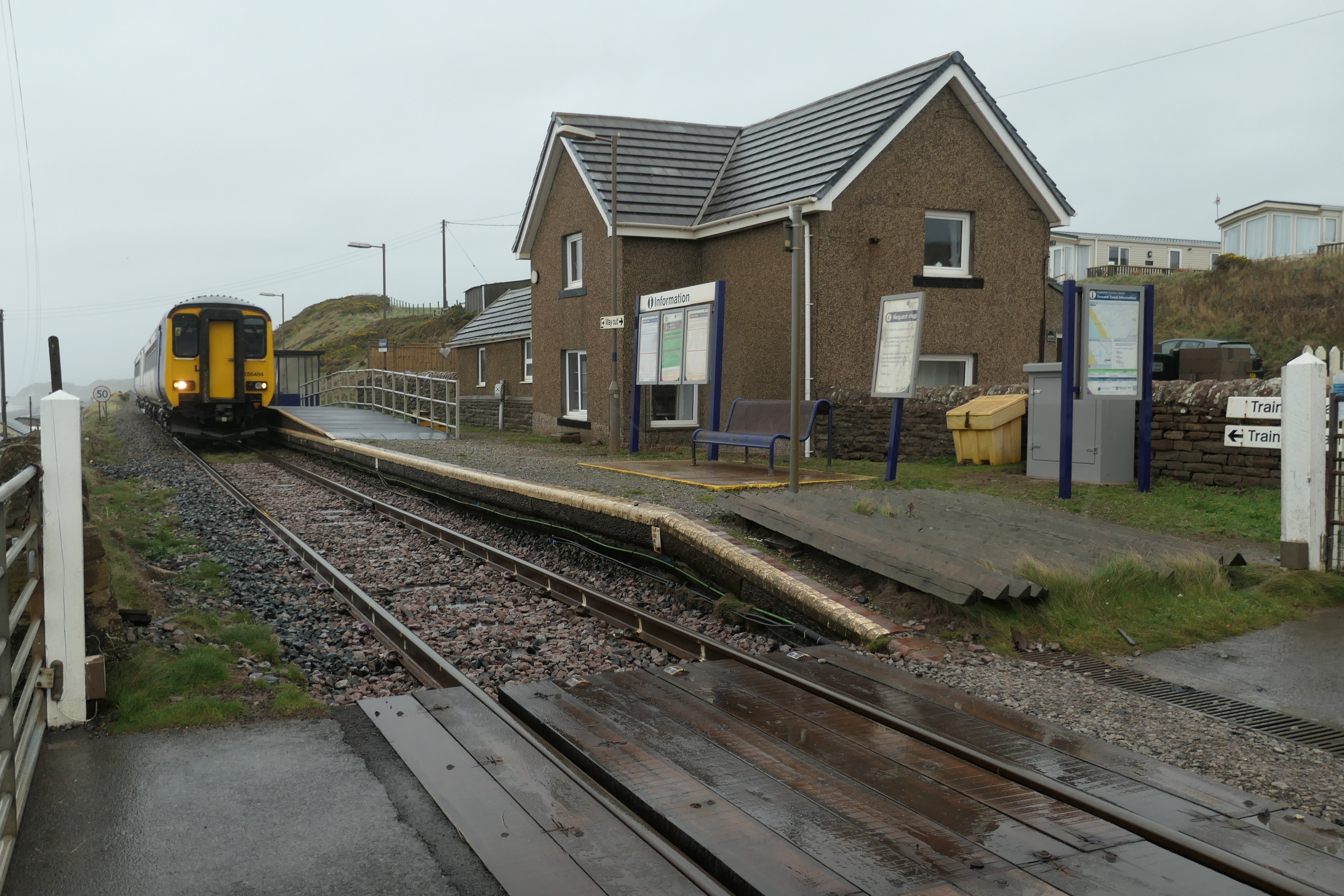
A southbound train seen in 2018

As of the May 2026 timetable, there are four northbound trains and five southbound trains on weekdays and Saturdays. There is a limited Sunday service of two trains northbound and three trains southbound. Due to ongoing engineering works, trains heading north terminate at Corkickle, rather than run through to Carlisle. A Sunday service was first introduced at the May 2018 timetable change.

Preceding station	National Rail	Following station
Nethertown	Northern Trains; Cumbrian Coast Line	Sellafield
	Historical railways	
Nethertown	Whitehaven and Furness Junction Railway	Sellafield

== Community rail ==
The station, along with all other stations along the line, are part of the Community Rail Cumbria group.

== Bibliography ==
- Caton, Peter (2018). Remote Stations. Leicestershire: Matador. ISBN 978-1-78901-408-2.
- Quick, Michael (2023). Railway Passenger Stations in Great Britain: A Chronology (PDF) (5th ed.). London: Railway and Canal Historical Society.
