= Coulderton =

Village in Cumbria, England

Coordinates: 54.463374°N 3.576672°W

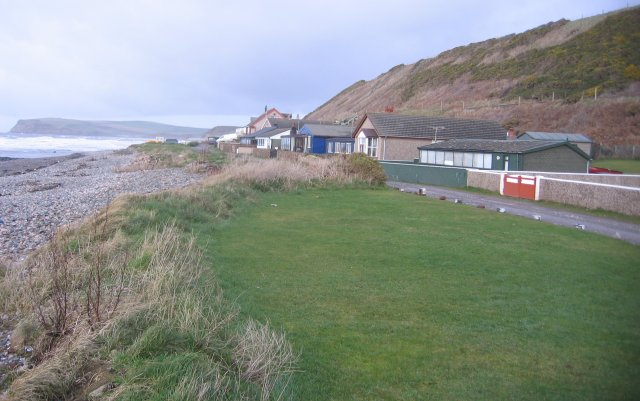
- The Coulderton beach houses

- Location in Copeland Borough Location within Cumbria
- OS grid reference: NX978087
- Civil parish: Lowside Quarter
- Unitary authority: Cumberland
- Ceremonial county: Cumbria
- Region: North West
- Country: England
- Sovereign state: United Kingdom
- Post town: EGREMONT
- Postcode district: CA22
- Dialling code: 01946
- Police: Cumbria
- Fire: Cumbria
- Ambulance: North West
- UK Parliament: Whitehaven and Workington

Coulderton is a coastal village in Cumbria, England. It is located just to the southwest of Egremont.
