= St Bees railway station =

Railway station in Cumbria, England

St Bees
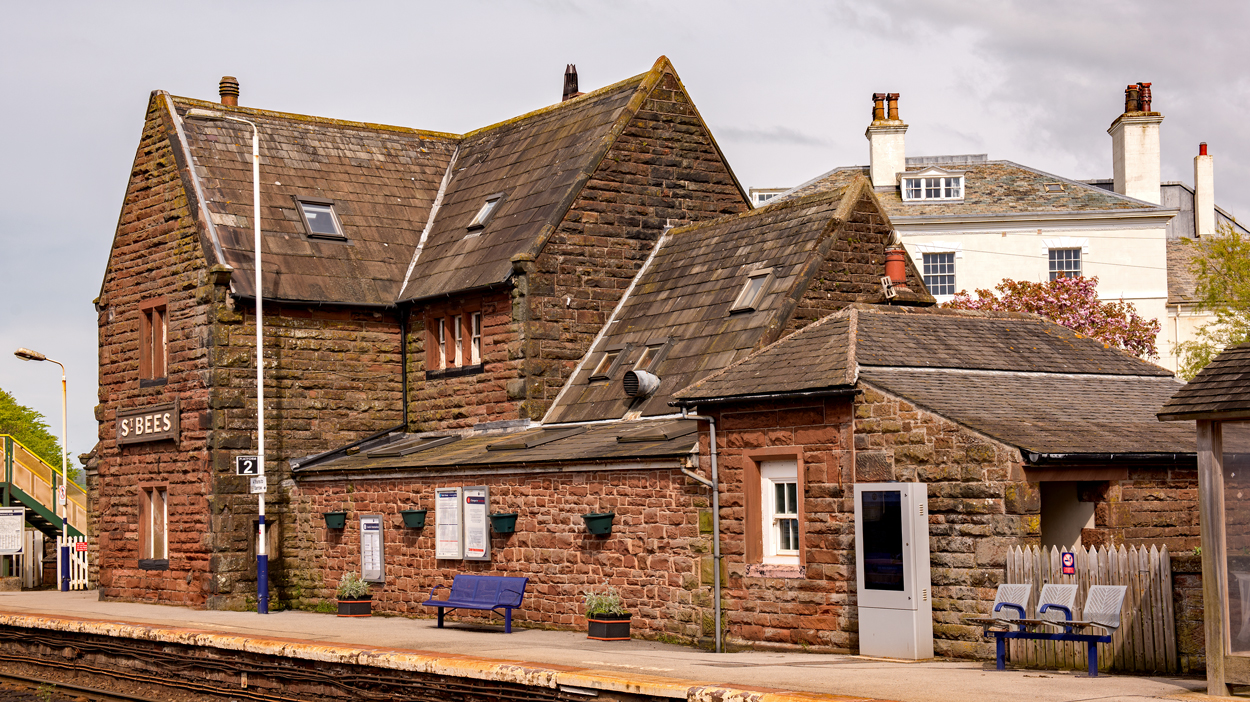

General information
- Location: St Bees, Cumberland; England
- Coordinates: 54°29′33″N 3°35′28″W
- Grid reference: NX970119
- Owner: Network Rail
- Manager: Northern Trains
- Platforms: 2
- Tracks: 2

Other information
- Station code: SBS
- Classification: DfT category F2

History
- Original company: Whitehaven and Furness Junction Railway
- Pre-grouping: Furness Railway
- Post-grouping: London, Midland and Scottish Railway; British Rail (London Midland Region)

Key dates
- 21 July 1849: Opened

Passengers
- 2021/22: ▲60,280
- 2022/23: ▲71,390
- 2023/24: ▲79,482
- 2024/25: ▲84,302
- 2025/26: ▼63,014
Location
- Location within the former Borough of Copeland Location within Cumbria
Notes
- Passenger statistics from the Office of Rail and Road

St Bees railway station is a railway station serving the village of St Bees in Cumbria, England. It is on the Cumbrian Coast Line, which runs between Carlisle and Barrow-in-Furness. It is owned by Network Rail and managed by Northern Trains.

It is the location of the only passing loop on the lengthy single track section between Whitehaven and Sellafield, and trains are often scheduled to pass each other here.

St Bees is famous for the rocky St Bees Head, the starting point of the Coast to Coast Walk which runs from the Irish Sea to the North Sea, and many walkers alight at the station to start the walk. The station has the distinction of being the most westerly in Northern England.

== History ==
The Whitehaven and Furness Junction Railway, a line which would link the town of Whitehaven with the Furness Railway at Broughton-in-Furness, was authorised in 1847. It was opened in stages and the first section, that between Whitehaven and Ravenglass, opened on 1 June 1849. St Bees station opened on 21 July 1849.

In 1848 Canon Richard Parkinson, Vicar of St Bees and Principal of the Theological College, wrote in his diary: "November 8th., 1848. The Railway-whistle heard for the first time in this quiet valley. Its peace is gone!" Later, on 12 February 1849, he records, "Ash Wednesday. Good congregation. The first train of coal wagons on this day (dies cinerum) ["Day of Ashes"] went on the railway to Braystones". Despite deploring this shattering of the valley's peace, Parkinson travelled on the official train when the line was opened as far as Ravenglass in 1849. The imposing station buildings, consisting of station master's house, waiting rooms and ticket office, were built in 1860 by Mr J Townley of Whitehaven.

=== Derailment ===
At about 6:45 am on 30 August 2012 a two-carriage passenger train en route to Sellafield was derailed a mile south of St Bees following a landslide caused by heavy rain.

Extensive civil engineering repair work has now been carried out to prevent a recurrence. In addition the underbridge at Seamill Lane was replaced in 2013.

== Description ==
The railway station is a stop on the scenic Cumbrian Coast Line, 43 miles (70 km) south-west of Carlisle. It is operated by Northern who provide all passenger train services. The station master's house and ticket office, on the up (southbound) platform, date from 1860 and was formerly a restaurant with a railway theme, but is now a private house. On the down (northbound) platform, the waiting room is still a period timbered Furness railway structure, slightly modified to become a private dwelling.

To the east of the "up" platform is the site of the goods yard which was heavily used for the stone traffic from the sandstone quarries at St Bees in the late 19th and early 20th centuries. It also handled the traffic from Walker's scone flour works and pickle factory, and the luggage traffic for St Bees School at the beginning and end of term. The yard is now a public car park which is subsidised for free public use by the Parish Council. The coal yard was off the down line on the north side of the level crossing.

Step-free access is available to both platforms via ramps from the road, and the low platforms have Harrington Humps for mobility-impaired users. Following the introduction of four-carriage locomotive working, in 2016 both platforms were extended by re-instatement of sections of unused platform. Train running information is offered via timetable posters, CIS screens and telephone. Tickets can be bought from a vending machine at the station or on the train.

=== Signal box ===
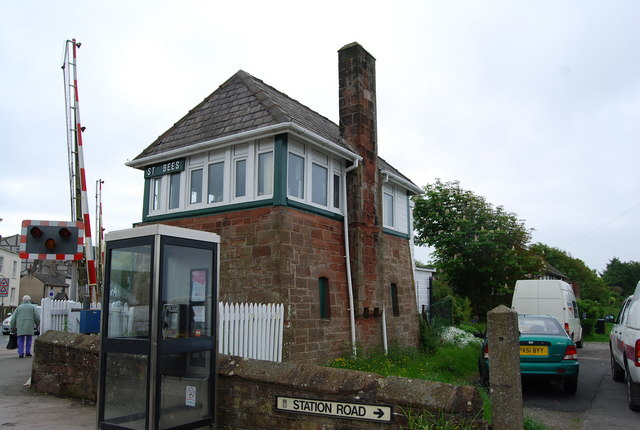
The Arts and Crafts design signal box, showing its architectural features

The station has a 24 lever signal box, which was opened in 1891 to meet the heavy traffic demands of that time. In December 2013 this was designated a Grade II listed building, being one of the few in the UK built in the "Arts and Crafts" style. This is a Furness Railway type 3 design. The English Heritage listing recommendation report says:

"The Type 3 design is one of the most distinctive boxes ever erected, in an arts and crafts style, probably influenced by the stations that Austin & Paley were designing for the Furness Railway. It has a tall battered base in stone and a steeply pitched tiled hipped roof. Tall window frames are individually grouped. Unfortunately the survivors have all had their windows replaced but this has altered their character less than other boxes with larger expanses of window and more complicated patterns of glazing. Examples survive at Park South (1883) and St. Bees (1891), the latter in an attractive rural setting is worth consideration [for listing]."

The level crossing is controlled by the signalman, who is also responsible for delivering the key tokens for both single line sections to train crews.

=== Position ===
The station is in the centre of the village, and there are three pubs within easy walking distance: one, the Albert, formerly being noted for having warning of the approaching trains rung through from the signal box in the evening. The beach, and the start of the Coast to Coast Walk are a 20-minute walk away.

== St Bees Golf Halt ==
St Bees Golf Halt was provided about a mile south of the village for golfers visiting the golf course. From 7 April 1914 golfers could halt a train by operation of a signal provided. The halt ceased operation in 1918.

== Services ==
On Mondays to Saturdays there is a roughly hourly service northbound to Carlisle and southbound to Barrow-in-Furness, with some extensions to Lancaster and Preston. A roughly hourly (each way) Sunday service was introduced at the May 2018 timetable change - the first such regular provision here since 1976.

| Preceding station | National Rail | Following station |
|---|---|---|
| Corkickle | Northern Trains; Cumbrian Coast Line | Nethertown |
| | Historical railways | |
| Corkickle | Whitehaven and Furness Junction Railway | Nethertown |
