= Corkickle railway station =

Railway station in Cumbria, England

Corkickle
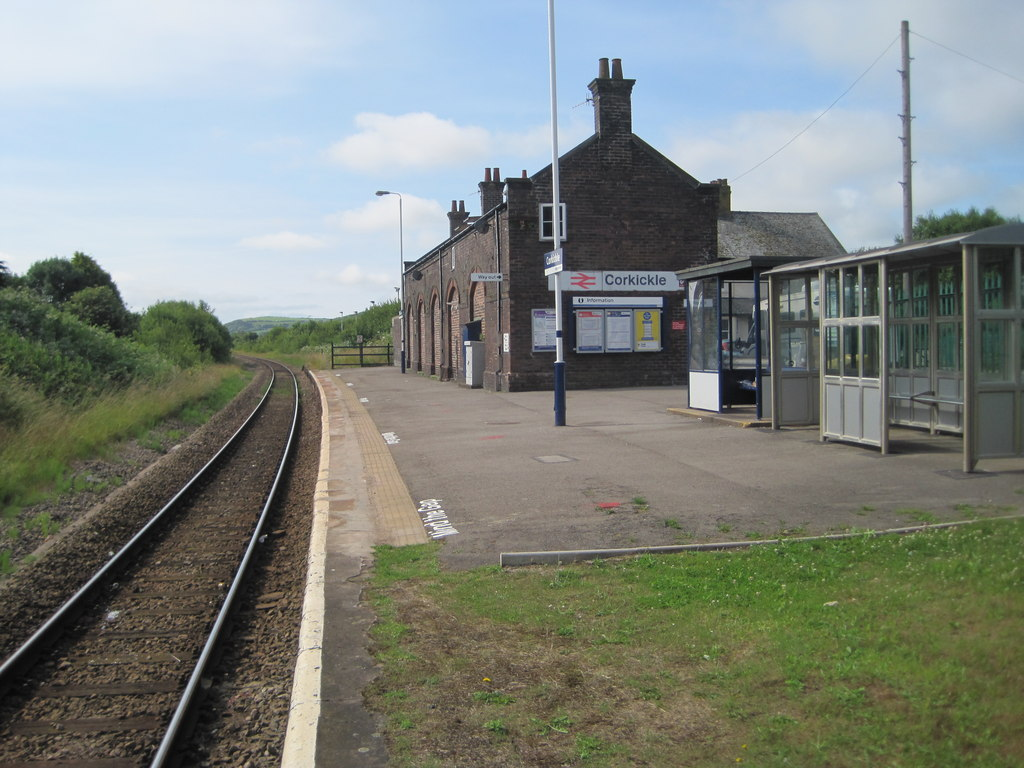

General information
- Location: Corkickle, Cumberland; England
- Coordinates: 54°32′29″N 3°34′55″W
- Grid reference: NX977174
- Owner: Network Rail
- Manager: Northern Trains
- Platforms: 1
- Tracks: 1

Other information
- Station code: CKL
- Classification: DfT category F2

History
- Original company: Whitehaven and Furness Junction Railway
- Pre-grouping: Furness Railway
- Post-grouping: London, Midland and Scottish Railway; British Rail (London Midland Region)

Key dates
- 19 July 1849: Opened as Whitehaven Newtown
- 3 December 1855: Resited and renamed Whitehaven Corkickle
- 1957: Renamed Corkickle

Passengers
- 2020/21: ▼18,114
- 2021/22: ▲44,724
- 2022/23: ▲51,068
- 2023/24: ▲54,254
- 2024/25: ▲65,558
Location
- Location within the former Borough of Copeland Location within Cumbria
Notes
- Passenger statistics from the Office of Rail and Road

Corkickle railway station is a railway station serving the suburb of Corkickle near Whitehaven in Cumbria, England. It is on the Cumbrian Coast Line, which runs between Carlisle and Barrow-in-Furness. It is owned by Network Rail and managed by Northern Trains. The station opened on 3 December 1855, and is at the southern end of the 1,219 m (3,999 ft) tunnel from Whitehaven. Between 1855 and 1957, the station was known as Whitehaven Corkickle.

== Facilities ==
The station building survives as a private residence. The station is a single platform and has shelters, display information and disabled access.

== Services ==
Monday to Saturday, there is an hourly service northbound to Carlisle and southbound to Barrow-in-Furness. There are no trains after 21:00 on Mondays-Saturdays, but since the May 2018 timetable change, a Sunday service now operates (for the first time since 1976) from mid-morning until early evening. Ongoing repairs to the tunnel through to Whitehaven have seen trains terminating here in the latter months of 2025, with a replacement bus service in operation. This was due to remain the case (along with an amended timetable) until repairs were complete in the spring of 2026, however on 13 April 2026 it was reported that work had yet to start, due to further issues being discovered which required Environment Agency permits to resolve.

Preceding station	National Rail	Following station
Whitehaven	Northern Trains; Cumbrian Coast Line / Windermere branch line	St Bees
	Historical railways	
Whitehaven	Whitehaven and Furness Junction Railway	St Bees

== Freight ==
The area immediately south of the station was for many years a busy freight location, handling haematite ore traffic from Moor Row mine as well as chemical tankers up & down the incline at the nearby Preston Street goods depot (the one time W&FJR passenger terminus) and associated yard. Two signal boxes (Corkickle No. 1 & No. 2) supervised the sidings, as well as controlling access to and from the incline and the Moor Row branch (the surviving portion of the former Whitehaven, Cleator and Egremont Railway line to Egremont & Sellafield). Although sufficiently busy to require its own resident shunting locomotive well into the 1970s, the gradual loss of traffic from the early 1980s onwards saw facilities run down and following the demise of Preston Street depot, the yard eventually closed (along with both signal boxes, which had been replaced by standard LMR-designed structures in 1958–59) on 15/16 February 1997. Today no trace remains of the sidings or either signal box, only the one surviving running line southwards towards St Bees & Sellafield.

== The Corkickle Brake ==
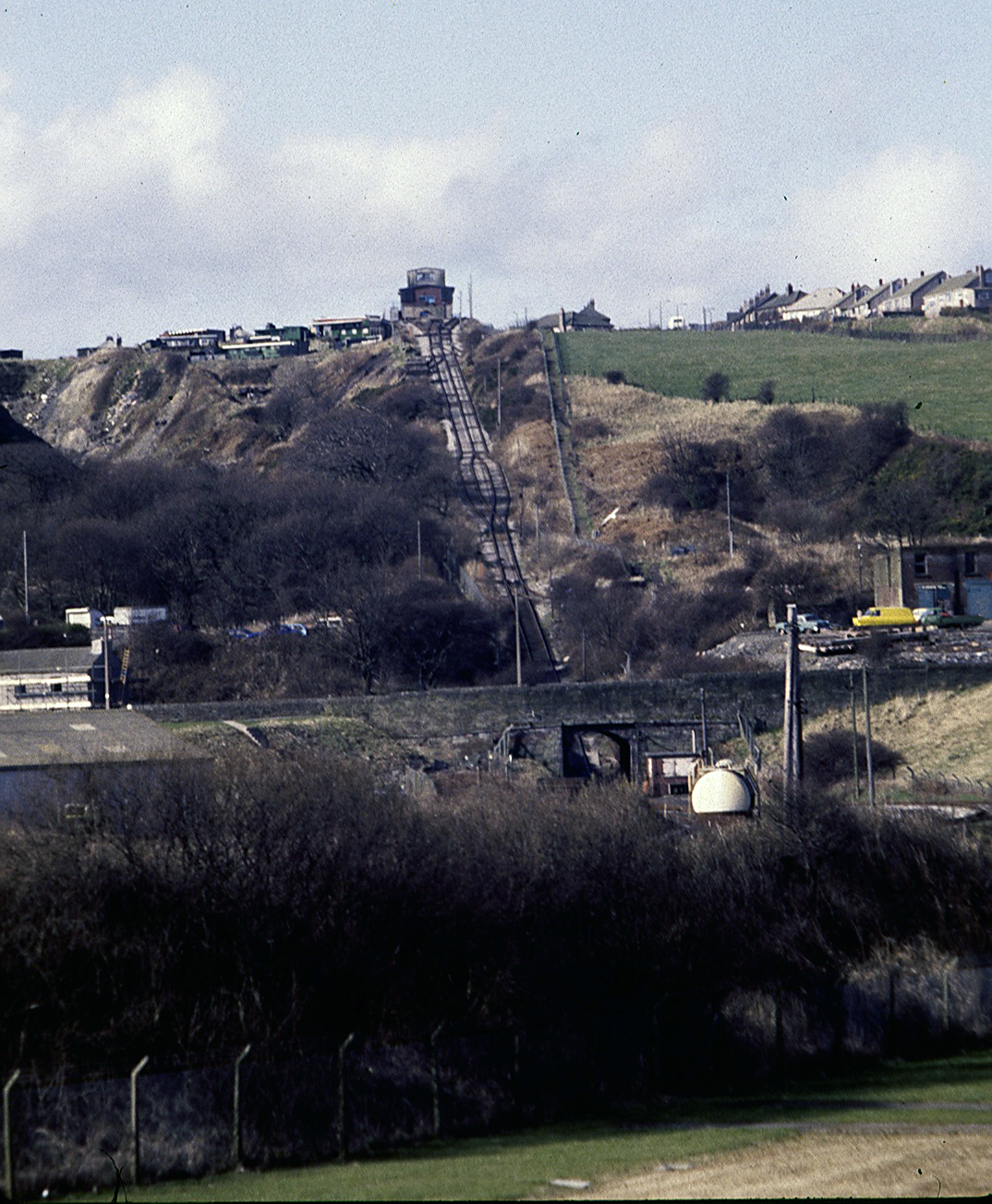
Corkickle Brake, showing the winding house on the skyline

In 1881 the Corkickle Brake, a roped incline 525 yards (480 m) in length and with gradients of between 1 in 5.2 and 1 in 6.6 was built from the Furness Railway main line, a short distance to the south of Corkickle station, to the Earl of Lonsdale's Croft Pit.

The 'brake' closed in 1931 due to the worsening financial situation of the colliery's owners, Lonsdale's Whitehaven Colliery Co. In May 1955, the incline was re-opened, this time to serve the factory of Marchon Products - a subsidiary of Albright and Wilson - at Kells. It was used mainly to haul rail tanker wagons containing sulphuric acid from the main line - by now in the ownership of British Railways - to the Marchon factory. The Corkickle Brake closed for good on 31 October 1986 when it was the last commercial roped incline in Britain. The task of transporting acid and other chemicals was taken over by road tankers.

== Sources ==
- British Railways London Midland Region Passenger Timetable, 16 September 1957 to 8 June 1958.
- GB Rail Timetable Winter Edition 13 December 2009 - 22 May 2010.
- Hyde, M. and Pevsner, N The Buildings of England: Cumbria. Yale University Press 2010. ISBN 978-0-300-12663-1
- Joy, D. Cumbrian Coast Railways. Dalesman Publishing 1968.
- Joy, D. A Regional History of the Railways of Great Britain, Volume 14: The Lake Counties. David and Charles 1983. ISBN 0-946537-02-X
- Mountford, C.E. Rope and Chain Haulage - The Forgotten Element of Railway History. Industrial Railway Society, 2013. ISBN 9781901556841
- Quayle, H. (2006). Whitehaven - The Railways and Waggonways of a Unique Cumberland Port. Cumbrian Railways Association. ISBN 978-0-9540232-5-6.
- Quick, Michael (2009) [2001]. Railway passenger stations in Great Britain: a chronology (4th ed.). Oxford: Railway & Canal Historical Society. ISBN 978-0-901461-57-5. OCLC 612226077.
- Routledge, A.W. Marchon - The Whtehaven Chemical Works. Tempus, 2005. ISBN 0752435728
