= Corkickle =

Suburb of Whitehaven, Cumbria, England

Coordinates: 54.538°N 3.577°W

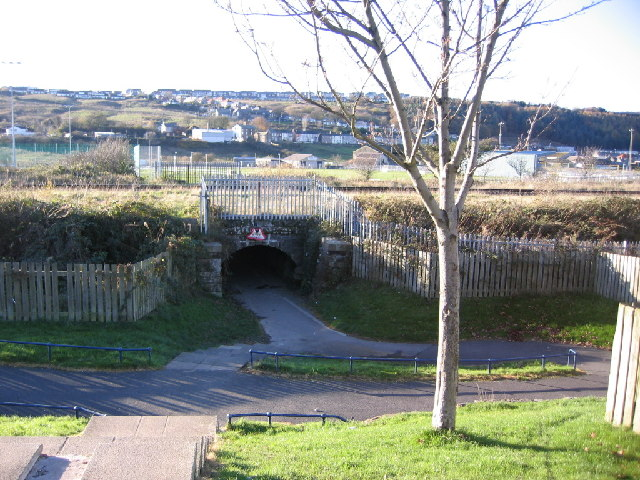
- C2C Cycleway under the railway at Corkickle

- Location in Copeland Borough Location within Cumbria
- OS grid reference: NX979170
- Civil parish: Whitehaven
- Unitary authority: Cumberland
- Ceremonial county: Cumbria
- Region: North West
- Country: England
- Sovereign state: United Kingdom
- Post town: WHITEHAVEN
- Postcode district: CA28
- Dialling code: 01946
- Police: Cumbria
- Fire: Cumbria
- Ambulance: North West
- UK Parliament: Whitehaven and Workington

Corkickle is a suburb of Whitehaven in Cumbria, England. It is served by Corkickle railway station.
