= Roose railway station =

Railway station in Cumbria, England

Roose
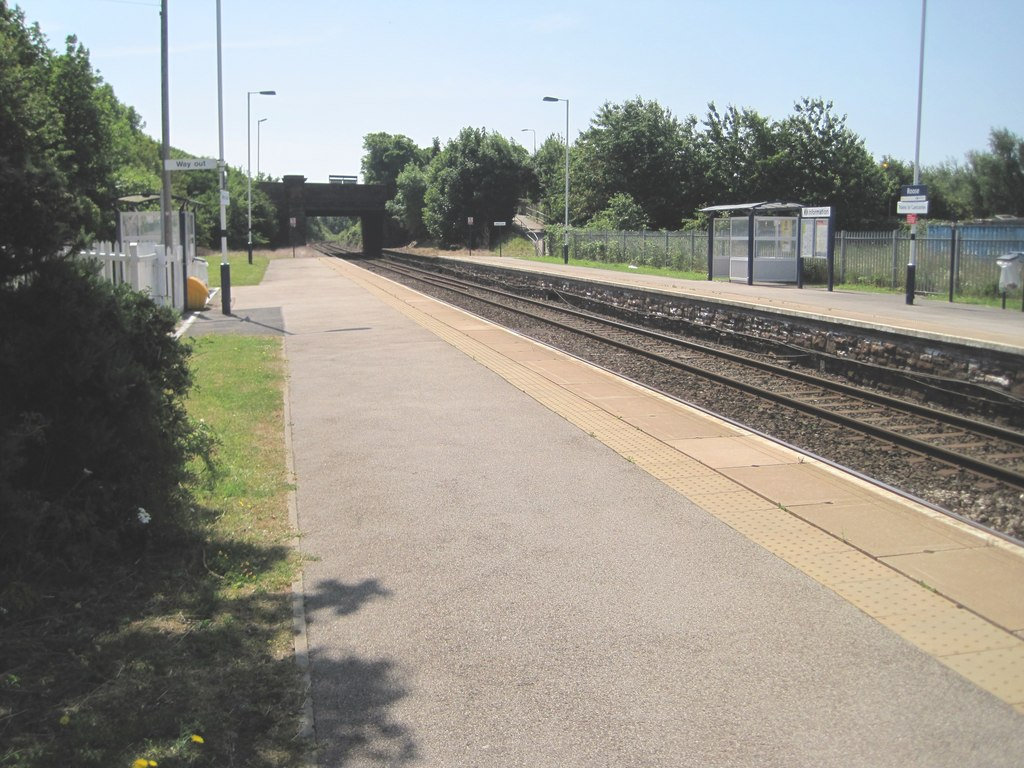

General information
- Location: Roose, Westmorland and Furness; England
- Coordinates: 54°06′54″N 3°11′40″W
- Grid reference: SD220694
- Owner: Network Rail
- Manager: Northern Trains
- Platforms: 2
- Tracks: 2

Other information
- Station code: ROO
- Classification: DfT category F2

History
- Original company: Furness Railway
- Pre-grouping: Furness Railway
- Post-grouping: London, Midland and Scottish Railway; British Rail (London Midland Region)

Key dates
- 1 June 1851: Opened as Roosegate
- 1 March 1858: Renamed Roose

Passengers
- 2020/21: ▼23,390
- 2021/22: ▲75,346
- 2022/23: ▼63,428
- 2023/24: ▲68,916
- 2024/25: ▲79,286
Location
- Location within the former Borough of Barrow-in-Furness Location within Cumbria
Notes
- Passenger statistics from the Office of Rail and Road

Roose is a railway station on the Furness Line, which runs between Barrow-in-Furness and Lancaster. The station, situated 1 3/4 miles (3 km) east of Barrow-in-Furness, serves the suburb of Roose in Barrow-in-Furness, Cumbria. It is owned by Network Rail and managed by Northern Trains.

== Facilities ==
Facilities here are very basic. The station is unstaffed and there are no permanent buildings present, other than standard shelters. A ticket vending machine is available on platform 1 for purchase of tickets or promise to pay coupons and for the collection of pre-paid tickets. As of today train running information is provided by digital display, telephone and timetable posters. Step-free access to the platforms is available via a ramp on the south side from the nearby road bridge that also acts as the link between the two and directly from the adjacent road on the northbound side.

== Services ==
Roose is served by Northern Trains, who operate a basic hourly service with some two hour gaps between Barrow-in-Furness and Lancaster. Certain trains are extended northwards to Workington and Carlisle, and several southbound services are extended to Preston or Manchester Airport. A similar service operates on Sundays.

Preceding station	National Rail	Following station
Barrow-in-Furness	Northern Trains; Cumbria–Manchester Airport	Dalton
Barrow-in-Furness	Northern Trains; Furness line	Dalton
	Historical railways	
Barrow-in-Furness Strand	Furness Railway	Furness Abbey
