= Whitehaven railway station =

Railway station in Cumbria, England

Whitehaven
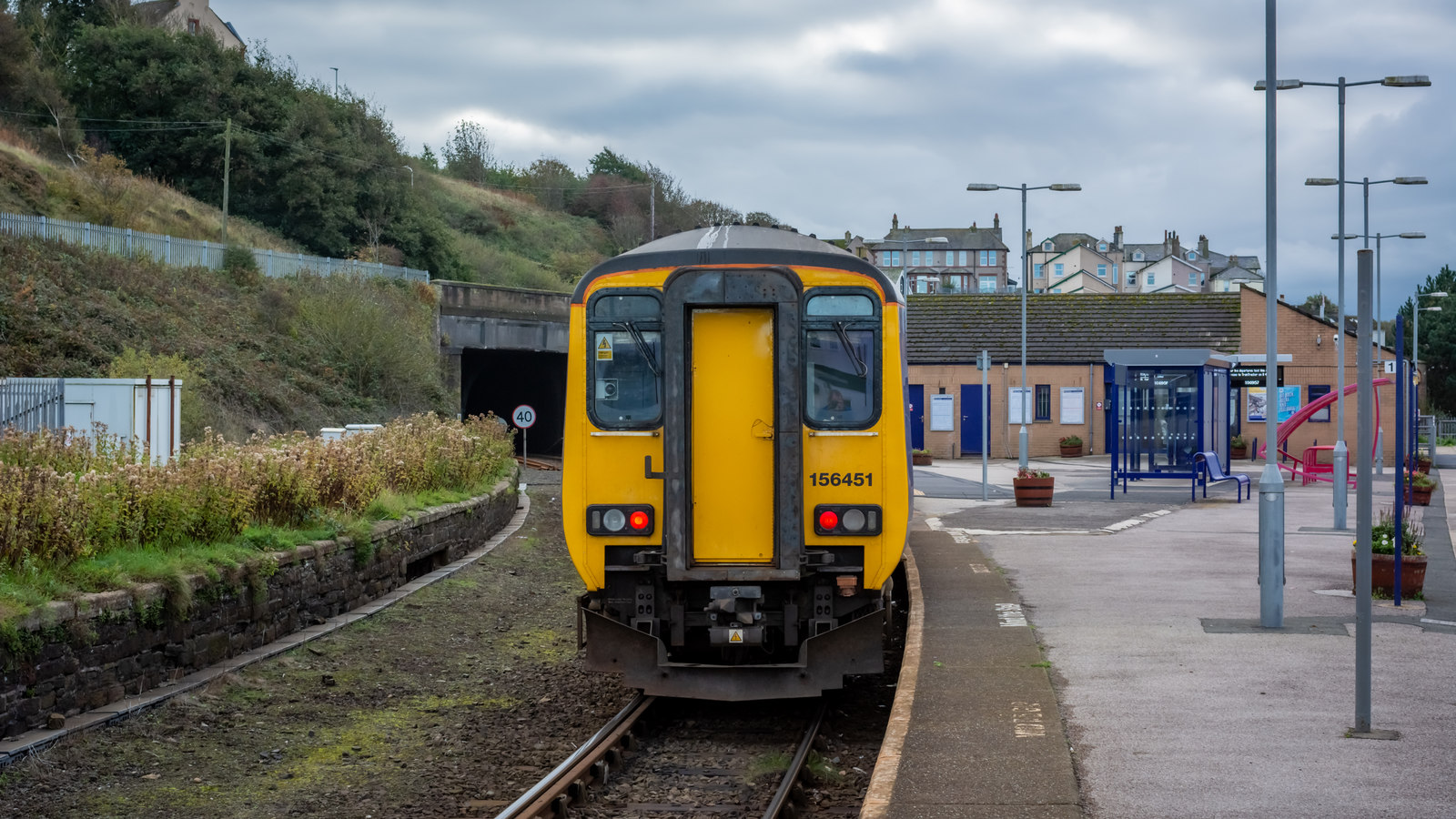

General information
- Location: Whitehaven, Cumberland; England
- Coordinates: 54°33′12″N 3°35′14″W
- Grid reference: NX974188
- Owner: Network Rail
- Manager: Northern Trains
- Platforms: 2
- Tracks: 2 (1 bay platform)

Other information
- Station code: WTH
- Classification: DfT category E

History
- Original company: Whitehaven Junction Railway
- Pre-grouping: Furness Railway; London and North Western Railway
- Post-grouping: London, Midland and Scottish Railway; British Rail (London Midland Region)

Key dates
- 19 March 1847: Opened as Whitehaven
- 20 December 1874: Resited and renamed Whitehaven Bransty
- 6 May 1968: Renamed Whitehaven

Passengers
- 2020/21: ▼67,378
- 2021/22: ▲0.221 million
- 2022/23: ▲0.241 million
- 2023/24: ▲0.255 million
- 2024/25: ▲0.285 million
Location
- Location within the former Borough of Copeland Location within Cumbria
Notes
- Passenger statistics from the Office of Rail and Road

Whitehaven railway station serves the coastal town of Whitehaven, in Cumbria, England. It is a stop on the Cumbrian Coast Line, which runs between Carlisle and Barrow-in-Furness. It is owned by Network Rail and managed by Northern Trains.

== History ==
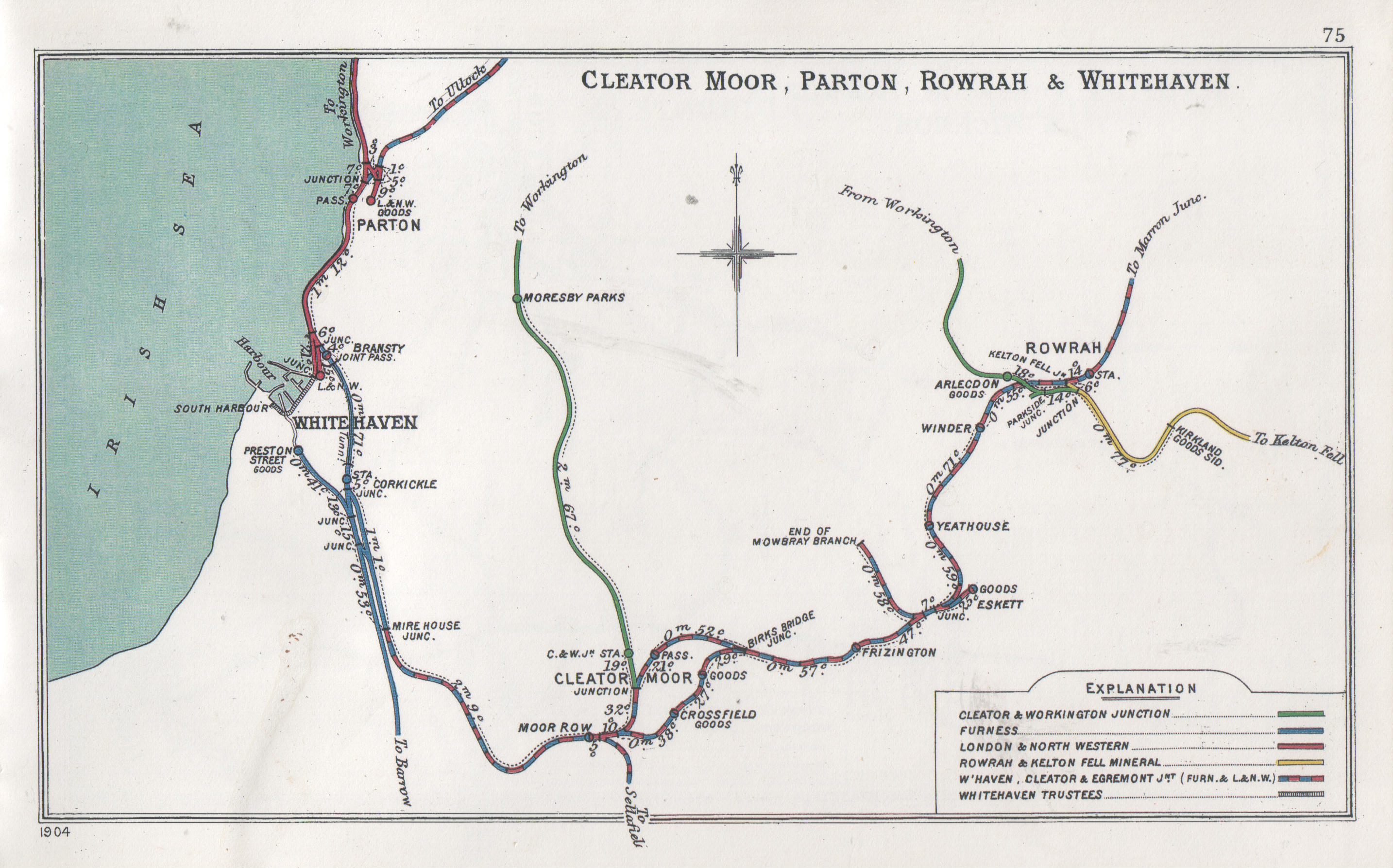
A 1904 Railway Clearing House junction diagram showing railways in the vicinity of Whitehaven (FR in blue; LNWR in red)

The first station at Whitehaven was opened on 19 March 1847 by the Whitehaven Junction Railway (WJR), as the terminus of their line from Maryport. This station lay to the south of the present station, with the main entrance on Bransty Row. (Note: The grid reference of the former site at Bransty Row is:grid reference NX974186)

On the southern side of the town, the first section of the Whitehaven and Furness Junction Railway (W&FJR) opened on 1 June 1849 from a terminus at Whitehaven (Preston Street) to Ravenglass, but there was no connection between this line and the WJR suitable for passenger trains. In between the two stations stood the town centre and, to the east of that, Hospital Hill; a tunnel 1,333 yards (1,219 m) long was built beneath the latter, being completed in July 1852. In 1854, the W&FJR passenger trains began using the WJR station at Whitehaven, with Preston Street becoming a goods-only station. In 1865, the W&FJR was absorbed by the Furness Railway (FR) and, in 1866, the WJR was absorbed by the London and North Western Railway (LNWR).

The LNWR station (formerly WJR) was replaced on 20 December 1874 by a new one named Whitehaven Bransty; it was jointly owned by the LNWR and the FR. This station had its name simplified to Whitehaven on 6 May 1968. The original buildings were demolished and replaced by a modern single-story ticket hall in the mid-1980s. The former goods yard site beyond and behind platform one is now occupied by a supermarket.

The station formerly had four operational platforms, but only two remain in use today (the former platforms three and four having lost their tracks when the layout was simplified and the buildings replaced). The double line from Parton becomes single opposite the station signal box, which still bears the original station name Whitehaven Bransty; it then splits into two: one runs into platform one (a bay used by most terminating services from Carlisle) and the other runs into platform two, which is the through line to Sellafield, Millom and Barrow. Trains heading south must collect a token for the single line section to St Bees from a machine on the platform (with the co-operation of the signaller) before they can proceed. Conversely, trains from Barrow must surrender the token upon arrival; the driver returns it to the machine before departing for Workington; only then can the signaller allow another train to enter the single line section.

A Sunday service over the whole length of the Coastal route operated on a one-off basis on Sunday 27 September 2009; the first time a revenue earning passenger Sunday service operated south of Whitehaven since May 1976. This celebrated the ACoRP Community Rail Festival. An improved Sunday service has been introduced as part of the current Northern franchise.

== Facilities ==
The ticket office is open six days per week and is closed evenings and Sundays; there is also a ticket machine available. Digital display screens, a passenger announcement system and information posters provide train running information. Step-free access is available through the main building to both platforms.

== Services ==
Northern Trains operates a generally hourly service northbound to Carlisle and southbound to Barrow-in-Furness; no late evening service operates south of here. A few through trains operate to/from Lancaster via the Furness line.

Northern Rail introduced a regular Sunday through service to Barrow via the coast at the May 2018 timetable change - the first such service south of Whitehaven for more than 40 years. Services run approximately hourly from mid-morning until early evening, with later trains starting and terminating here. This represented a major upgrade on the previous infrequent service of four per day each way to/from Whitehaven only. Repairs to the tunnel southwards to Corkickle and Millom/Barrow saw services beyond here suspended in July 2025, with a replacement bus service provided through the town to Corkickle for onward connections. This will remain until the old mine workings beneath the tunnel floor have been sealed and filled with grout - repairs are likely to continue until the spring of 2026. Services remain running to Workington and Carlisle.

Preceding station	National Rail	Following station
Parton	Northern Trains; Cumbrian Coast Line	Corkickle
	Historical railways	
Parton	London and North Western Railway; Whitehaven Junction Railway	Terminus
Terminus	Whitehaven and Furness Junction Railway	Corkickle
