= Braystones =

Village in Cumbria, England

Coordinates: 54.43°N 03.54°W

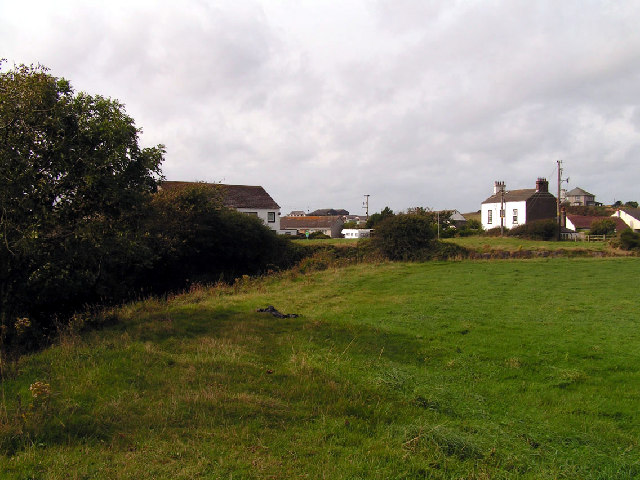
- Braystones

- Location in Copeland Borough Location within Cumbria
- OS grid reference: NY0005
- Civil parish: Lowside Quarter
- Unitary authority: Cumberland
- Ceremonial county: Cumbria
- Region: North West
- Country: England
- Sovereign state: United Kingdom
- Post town: BECKERMET
- Postcode district: CA21
- Dialling code: 01946
- Police: Cumbria
- Fire: Cumbria
- Ambulance: North West
- UK Parliament: Whitehaven and Workington

Braystones is a village in Cumbria, England, historically within Cumberland. It is located on the Irish Sea coast, on edge of the Lake District National Park, around 38.6 miles (62.1 km) north of Barrow-in-Furness, 9.9 miles (15.9 km) south of Whitehaven and 50.8 miles (81.8 km) south west of Carlisle.

Traditionally a scattered community based on agriculture, it has grown considerably during the 20th century by firstly, the construction of holiday cabins on the beach, and latterly by the creation of large caravan parks. It has long been a popular holiday area.

== Governance ==
Braystones is in the parliamentary constituency of Whitehaven and Workington.

The village has its own Parish Council; Lowside Quarter Parish Council.

== Nuclear ==
In 2009, Braystones was approved by the British government as a site for a new nuclear power station. However, the site was ruled out by Secretary of State for Energy and Climate Change Chris Huhne in October 2010 for environmental reasons with the former government's list of eleven potential sites reduced to eight.

== Transport ==
Braystones railway station is on the Cumbrian Coast Line and has been served by the railway since 1850.

== Gallery ==
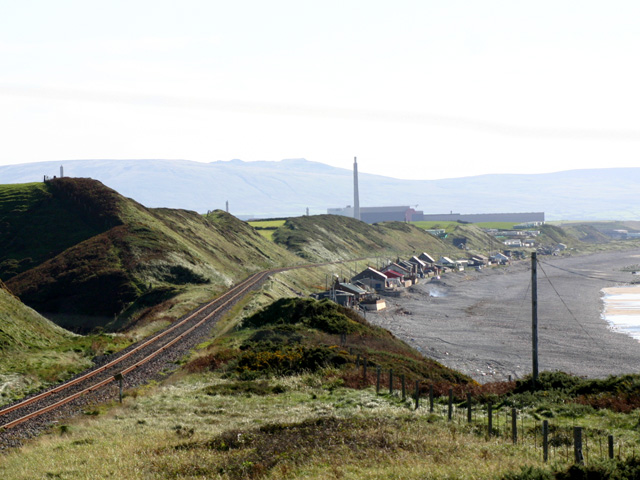
Braystones from the north

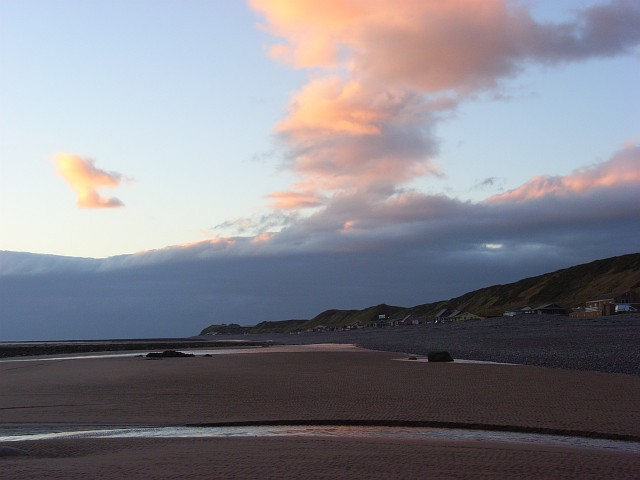
Braystones beach

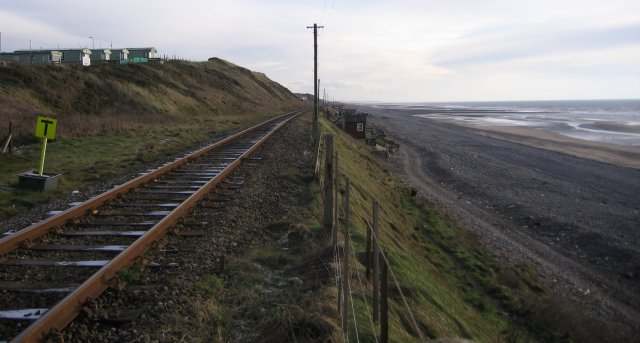
Cumbrian Coast rail line at Braystones

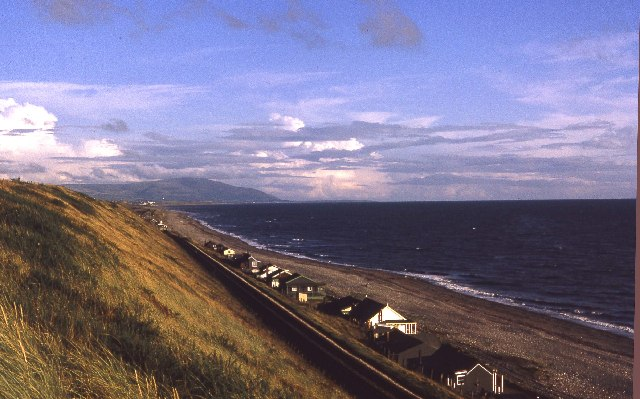
Braystones beach
