= Nethertown =

Village in Cumbria, England

Coordinates: 54.453°N 03.559°W

- Village
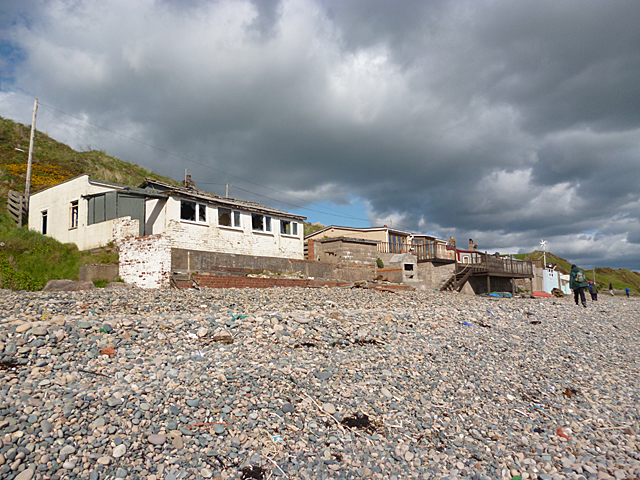
- Beach Houses, Nethertown

- Location in the former Copeland Borough Location within Cumbria
- OS grid reference: NX9907
- Unitary authority: Cumberland
- Ceremonial county: Cumbria
- Region: North West
- Country: England
- Sovereign state: United Kingdom
- Post town: Egremont
- Postcode district: CA22
- Dialling code: 01946
- Police: Cumbria
- Fire: Cumbria
- Ambulance: North West
- UK Parliament: Whitehaven and Workington

Nethertown is a small village in Cumberland, Cumbria, England on the Irish Sea coast.

The community is covered by the civil parish of Lowside Quarter and was created out of one of the old parochial townships of the parish of St Bees.

== History ==
During WW2 an anti-aircraft training camp was established, which later became the contractor camp housing workers building the Sellafield Nuclear plant from the late 1940s to early 1950s. Following the departure of the contractors, the canteen was converted into the "Tow Bar Inn" - a well patronised dance venue. This was closed in the 1980s and the site is now a private residential estate.

The village had its own school, which later became a mission church for St Bees Priory. It is now a private residence.

The community today is predominantly residential and agricultural.

== Transport links ==
It is served by Nethertown railway station which is spectacularly sited on a short cliff above the Irish Sea coast.

== Gallery ==
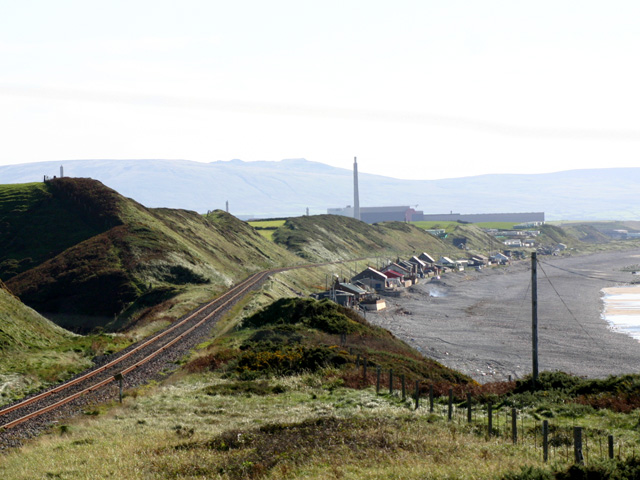
Looking south from Nethertown

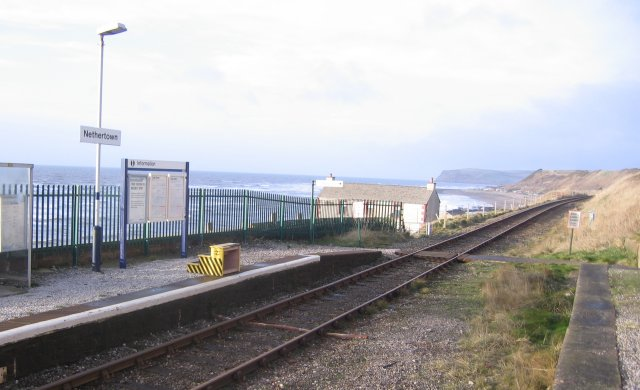
Looking North to St Bees Head from the station

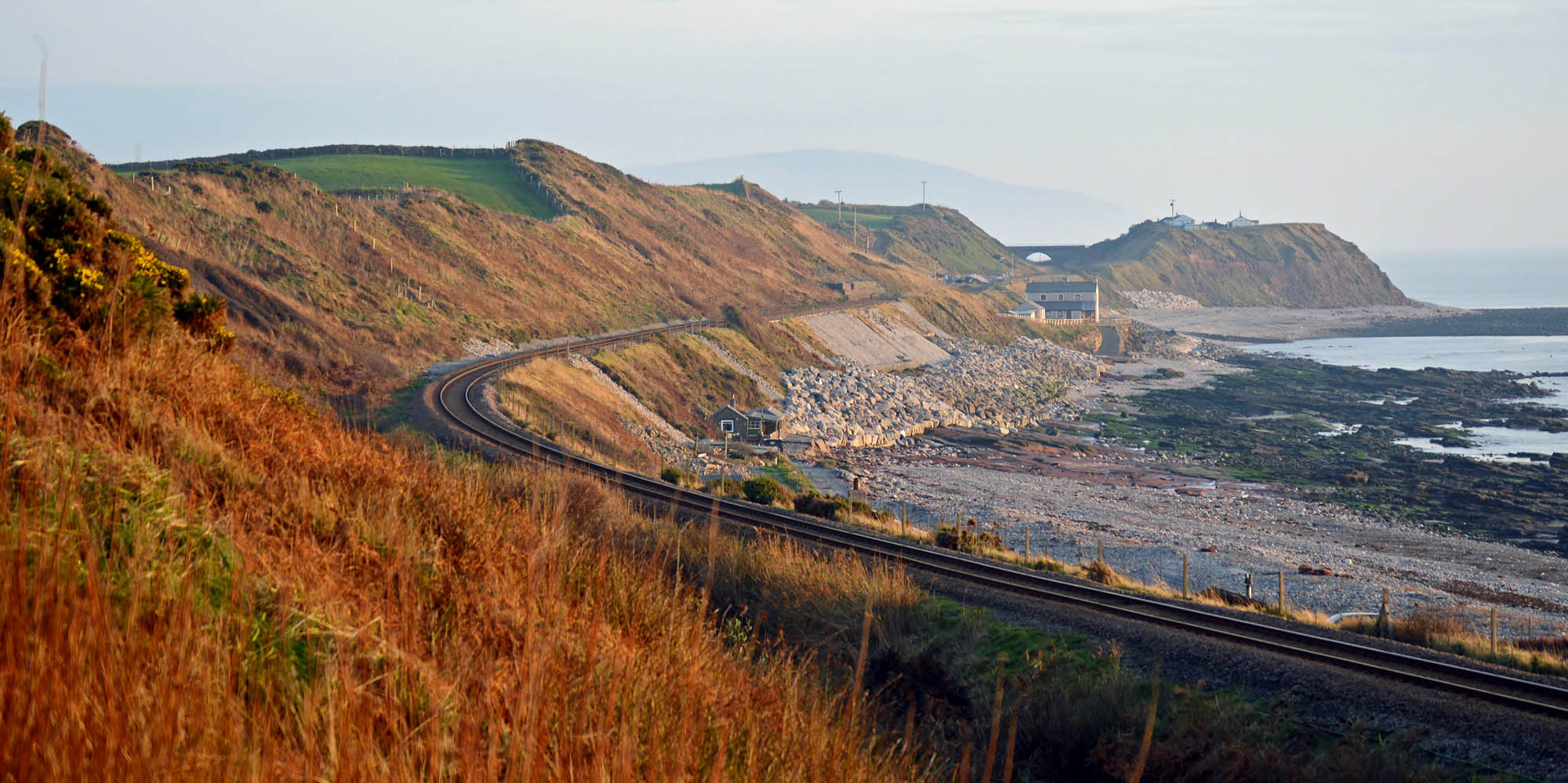
The Cumbrian Coast Line just north of Nethertown station, which is just to left of the house

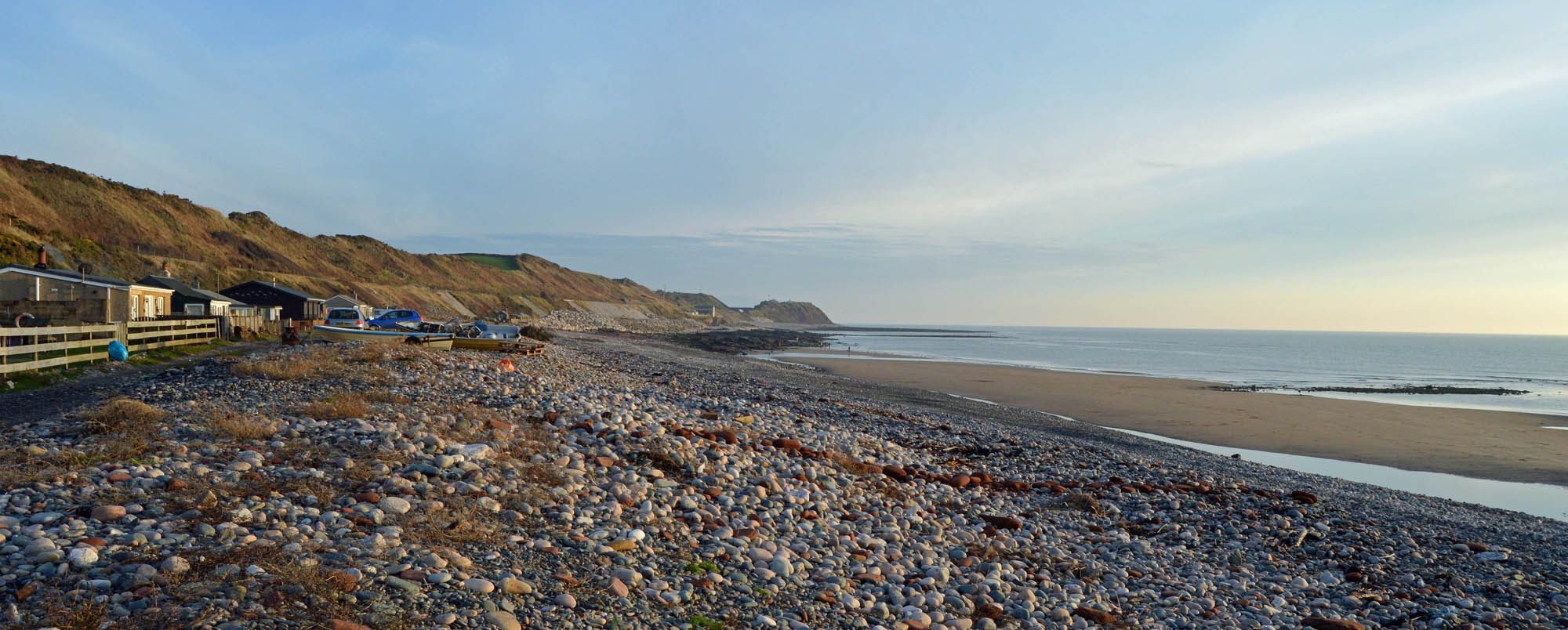
View towards Nethertown from Coulderton beach

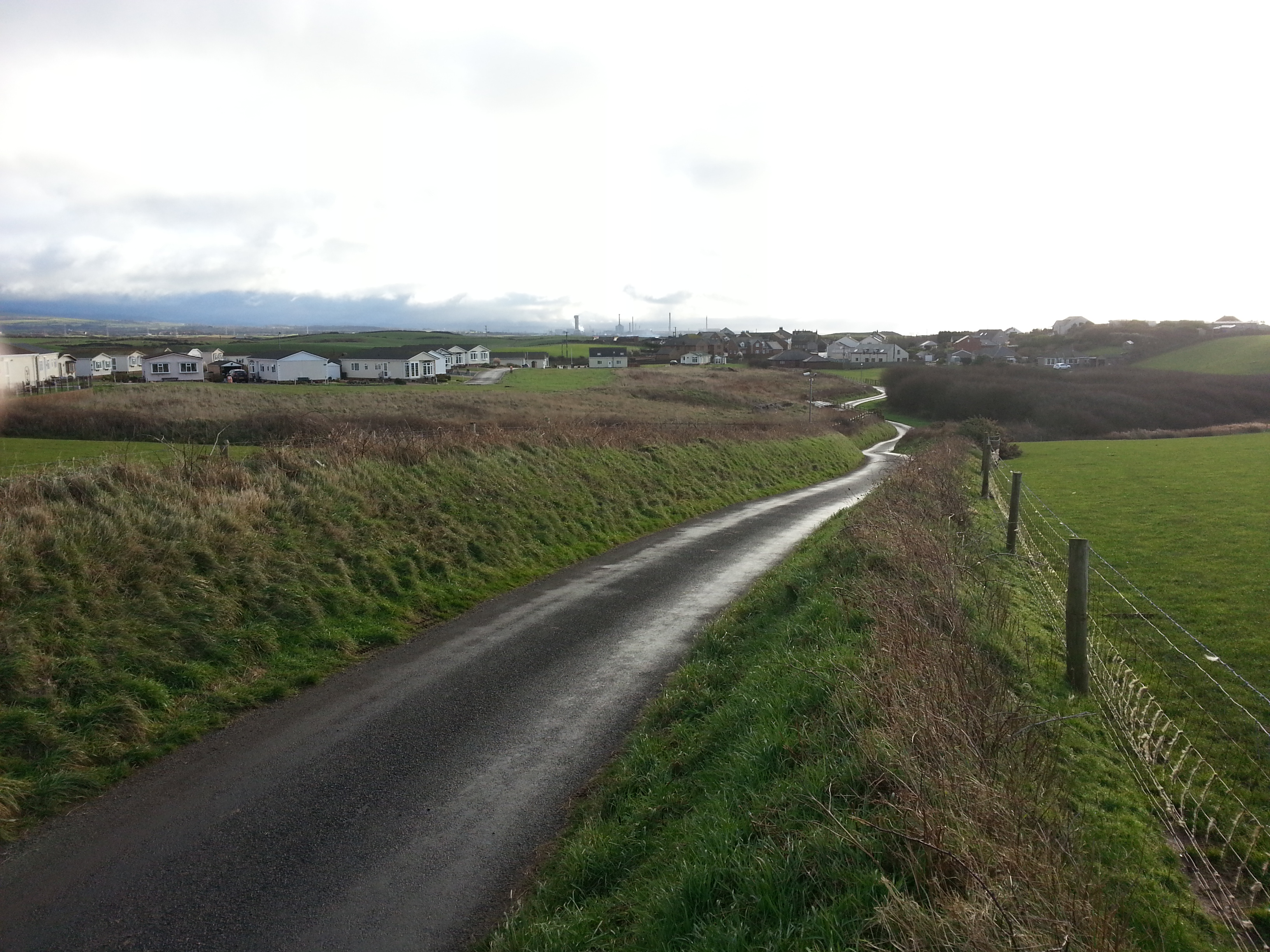
View of Nethertown from the St Bees road. Site of the army camp on the left

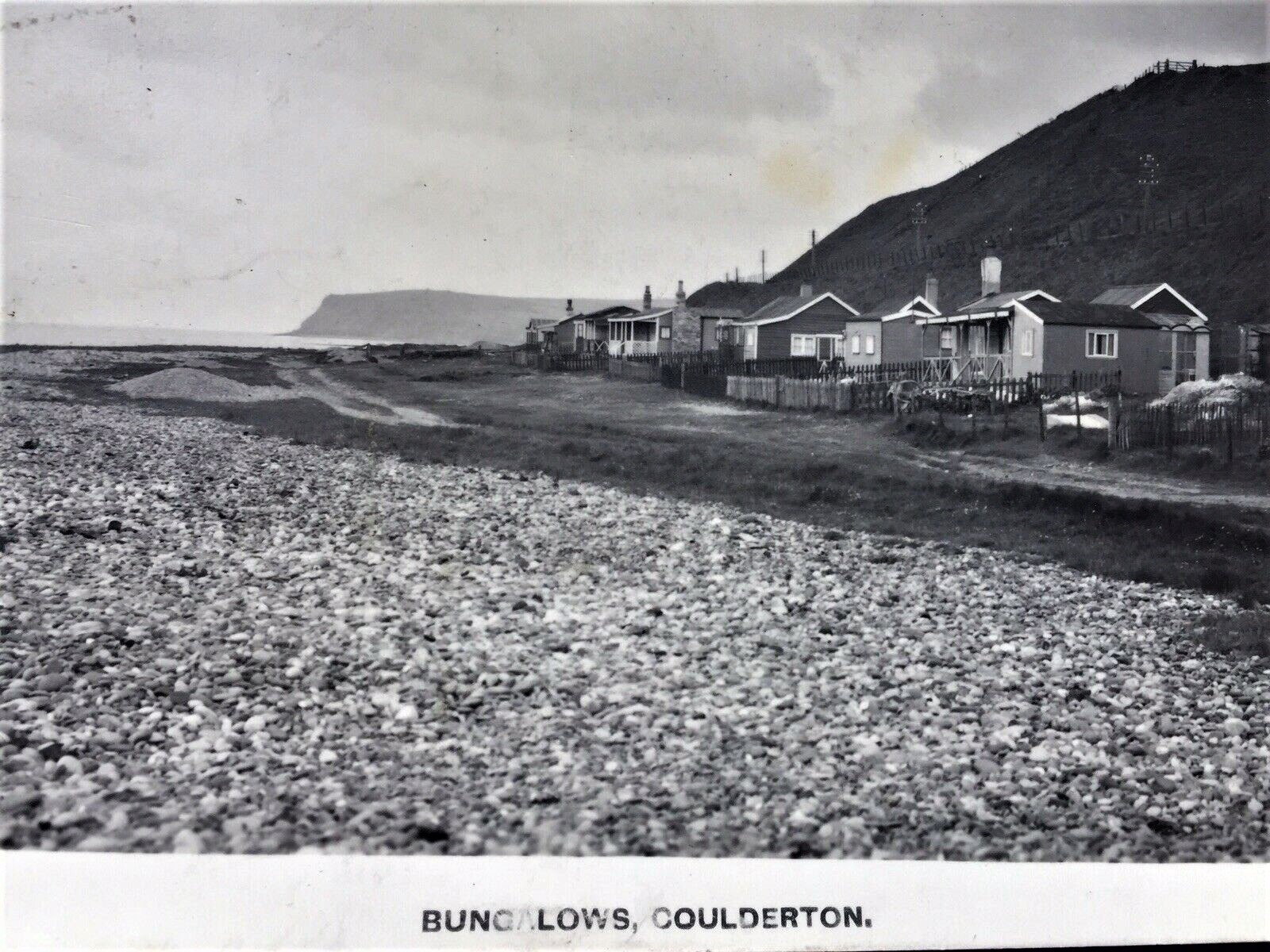
Coulderton beach

== Video ==
video of mainline class 37 at 60 mph through Nethertown.
