= Barrow-in-Furness railway station =

Railway station in Cumbria, England

Barrow-in-Furness
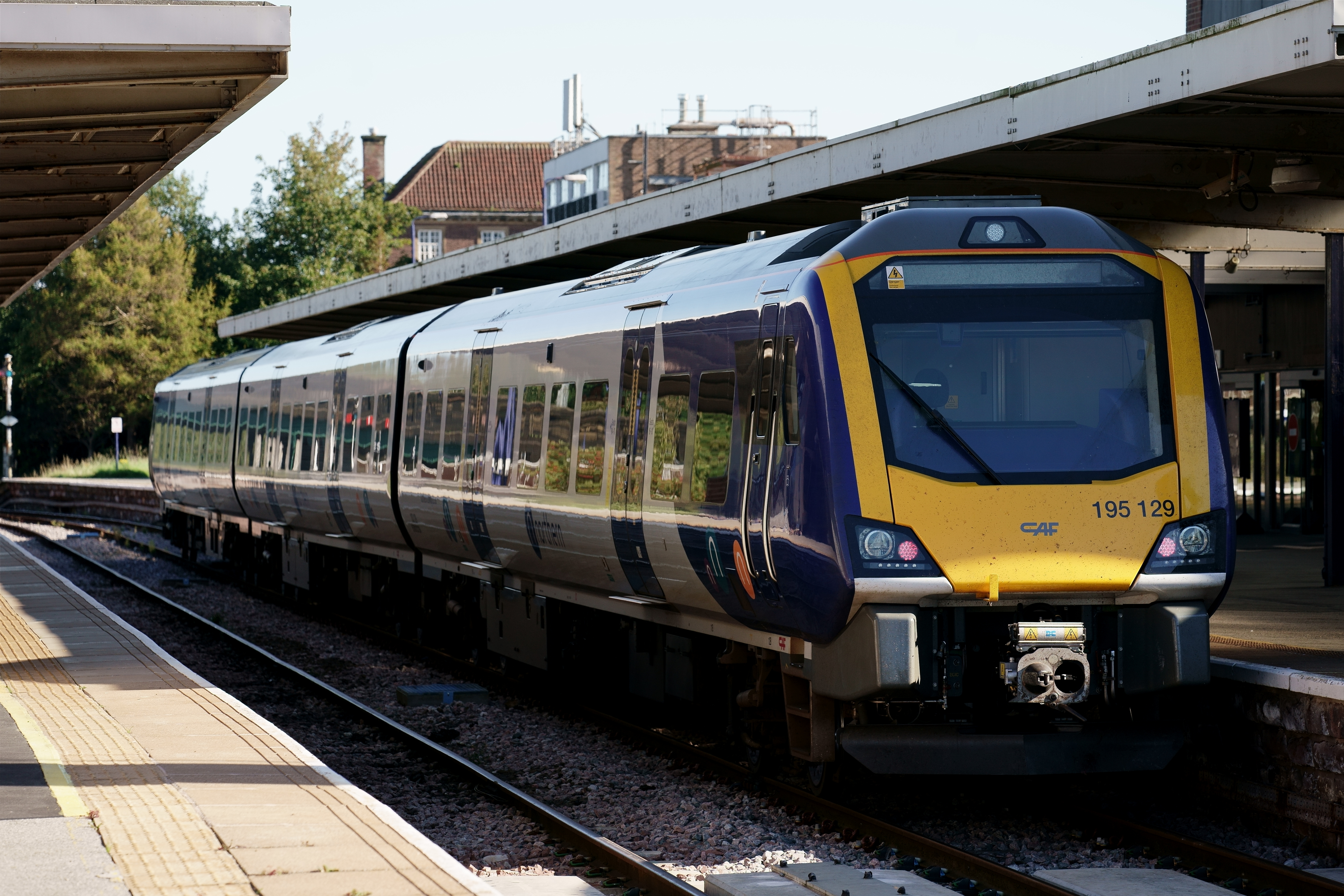

General information
- Location: Barrow-in-Furness, Westmorland and Furness, England
- Coordinates: 54°07′09″N 3°13′34″W
- Grid reference: SD199699
- Owner: Network Rail
- Manager: Northern Trains
- Platforms: 3
- Tracks: 3

Other information
- Station code: BIF
- Classification: DfT category D

History
- Original company: Furness Railway
- Pre-grouping: Furness Railway
- Post-grouping: London, Midland and Scottish Railway, British Rail (London Midland Region)

Key dates
- 24 August 1846: Opened as Barrow Pier
- 29 April 1863: Resited and renamed Barrow Strand
- 1 June 1882: Resited and renamed Barrow Central
- 14 November 1957: Renamed Barrow-in-Furness

Passengers
- 2020/21: ▼0.198 million
- Interchange: ▼5,940
- 2021/22: ▲0.522 million
- Interchange: ▲20,919
- 2022/23: ▲0.540 million
- Interchange: ▲26,332
- 2023/24: ▲0.559 million
- Interchange: ▼25,078
- 2024/25: ▲0.590 million
- Interchange: ▼24,412
Location
- Location within the former Borough of Barrow-in-Furness Location within Cumbria
Notes
- Passenger statistics from the Office of Rail and Road

Barrow-in-Furness railway station serves the town of Barrow-in-Furness, in Cumbria, England. It lies on the Cumbrian Coast and Furness Lines, 85 1/2 miles (138 km) south-west of Carlisle and 34 3/4 miles (56 km) north-west of Lancaster. It is owned by Network Rail and managed by Northern Trains.

== History ==
The present station was formerly known as Barrow Central and, at one time, it was a terminus for British Rail's InterCity services. From October 1947 until May 1983, these included sleeper services to and from London Euston. A sleeper service in the London direction only was reintroduced briefly between May 1987 and May 1990.

The original Barrow station of 1846 had been a wooden building at Rabbit Hill, near to the site of the present St. George's Square. It was eventually replaced in 1863 by a new brick building close by, which had been designed by the Lancaster architect Edward Paley, and which latterly came to be known as Cambridge Hall.

On 1 June 1882, the town's principal station was transferred to its present site below Abbey Road, following the construction of a new loop line. It had to be almost entirely rebuilt in the late 1950s, after World War II, having largely been destroyed by enemy bombing on 7 May 1941.

From 1907 to 1941, the Furness Railway steam locomotive, Coppernob, was preserved in a special glass case outside the station. It was subsequently transferred away for additional security and is now in the National Railway Museum at York.

== Facilities ==
The station has the following facilities:

- Platform 1 contains the entrance to the station; it has a waiting area, ticket & information office, and toilets, along with a café.
- Between platforms 2 and 3 is an indoor waiting area, with live departures indicator, a vending machine and speakers. There are offices for staff and British Transport Police.
- Electronic information signs have been installed, along with improved CCTV after several incidents on the station. Ramps have been provided for access and this is continuing with provision of better access to platforms 2 and 3
- There is a car park with 61 spaces, along with bicycle racks and storage.

== Layout ==
=== Platforms ===
The platforms are generally used as follows:

1. for through trains from Preston and Lancaster to Carlisle; also for trains to/from Preston and Manchester Airport
2. for services heading south to Lancaster or Preston, and local trains arriving from Millom and Sellafield; it can also be used by northbound departures
3. a bay platform that can only be used by northbound trains to Millom and Carlisle; it was formerly a through line for southbound trains until the late 1960s.

=== Depot ===
A light maintenance depot is situated immediately north of the station. In 2023, the depot was upgraded with a new 75-metre service road and steel canopy. Following the upgrade, three carriages can be serviced and fuelled simultaneously.

== Services ==
Northern Trains operates the following general off-peak service pattern in trains per hour/day (tph/tpd):

- 1 tph to Carlisle, via Sellafield, Whitehaven and Workington
- 10 tpd to Manchester Airport, via Lancaster, Preston and Manchester Piccadilly
- 1 tpd to Bolton, via Preston and Lancaster
- 5 tpd to Preston, via Lancaster
- 8 tpd to Lancaster.

One service per day operates to/from Sellafield, specifically for workers at the nuclear plant.

Preceding station	National Rail	Following station
Terminus	Northern Trains; Cumbria–Manchester Airport	Roose
Terminus	Northern Trains; Cumbria–Manchester Airport	Ulverston
Askam	Northern Trains; Cumbrian Coast Line	Terminus
Terminus	Northern Trains; Furness Line	Roose
	Historical railways	
Island Road	Furness Railway	Roose

== In popular culture ==
In the Railway Series books by the Rev. W Awdry, and the adapted television series Thomas & Friends, Barrow Central is the mainland terminus for the Fat Controller's North Western Railway. It is connected to the fictional Island of Sodor by a bridge to Vickerstown or, as it is known in the books, Vicarstown.

== Gallery ==
The original station building, as it appeared between 1882 and 1941

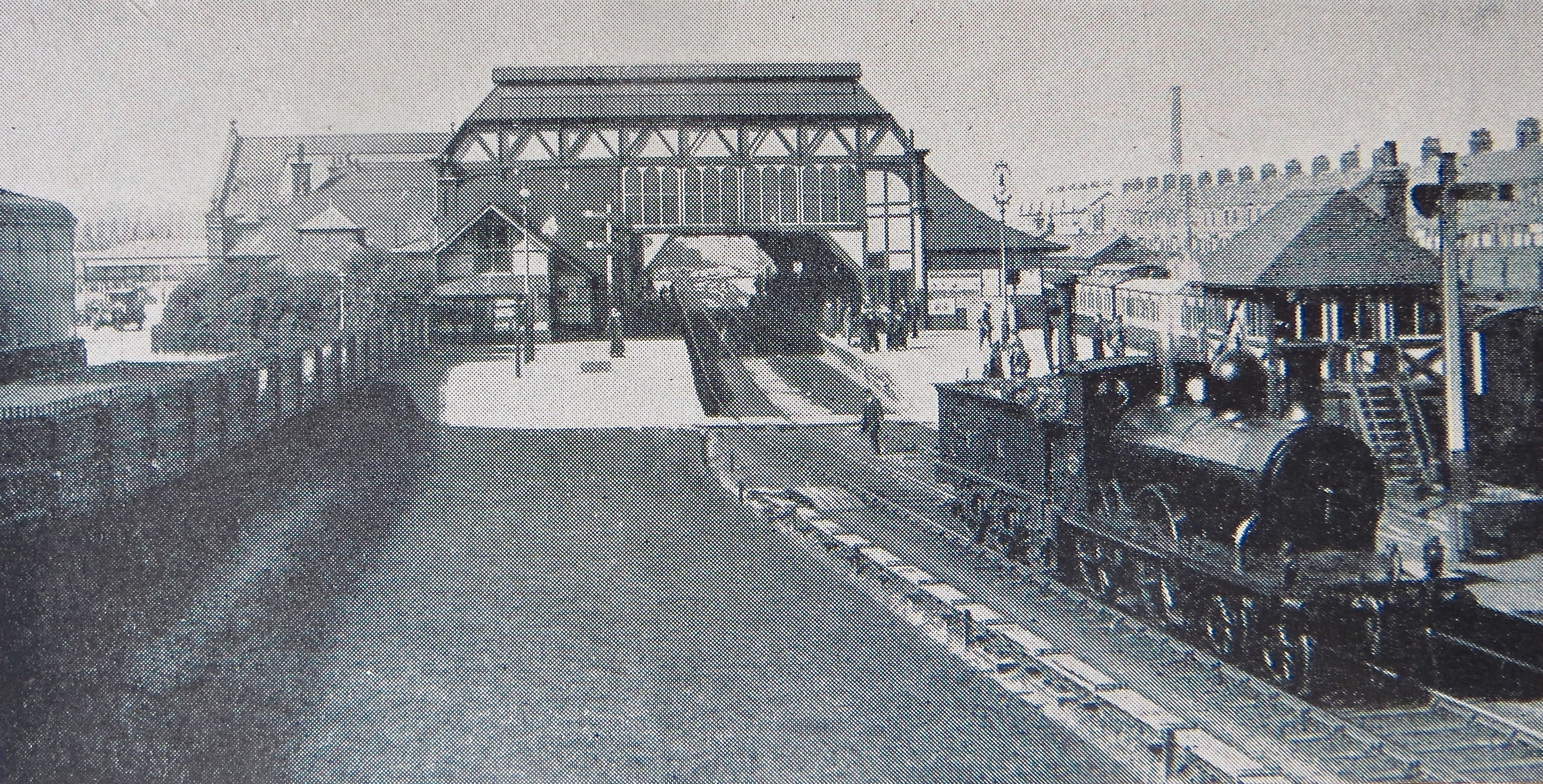
The original station building, viewed from the south in the mid 1910s; note the train shed

The original station building, following World War II Luftwaffe bombing, photographed in 1941

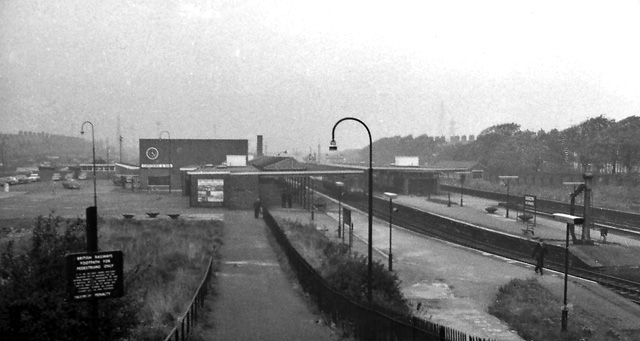
The current station building, photographed in October 1966

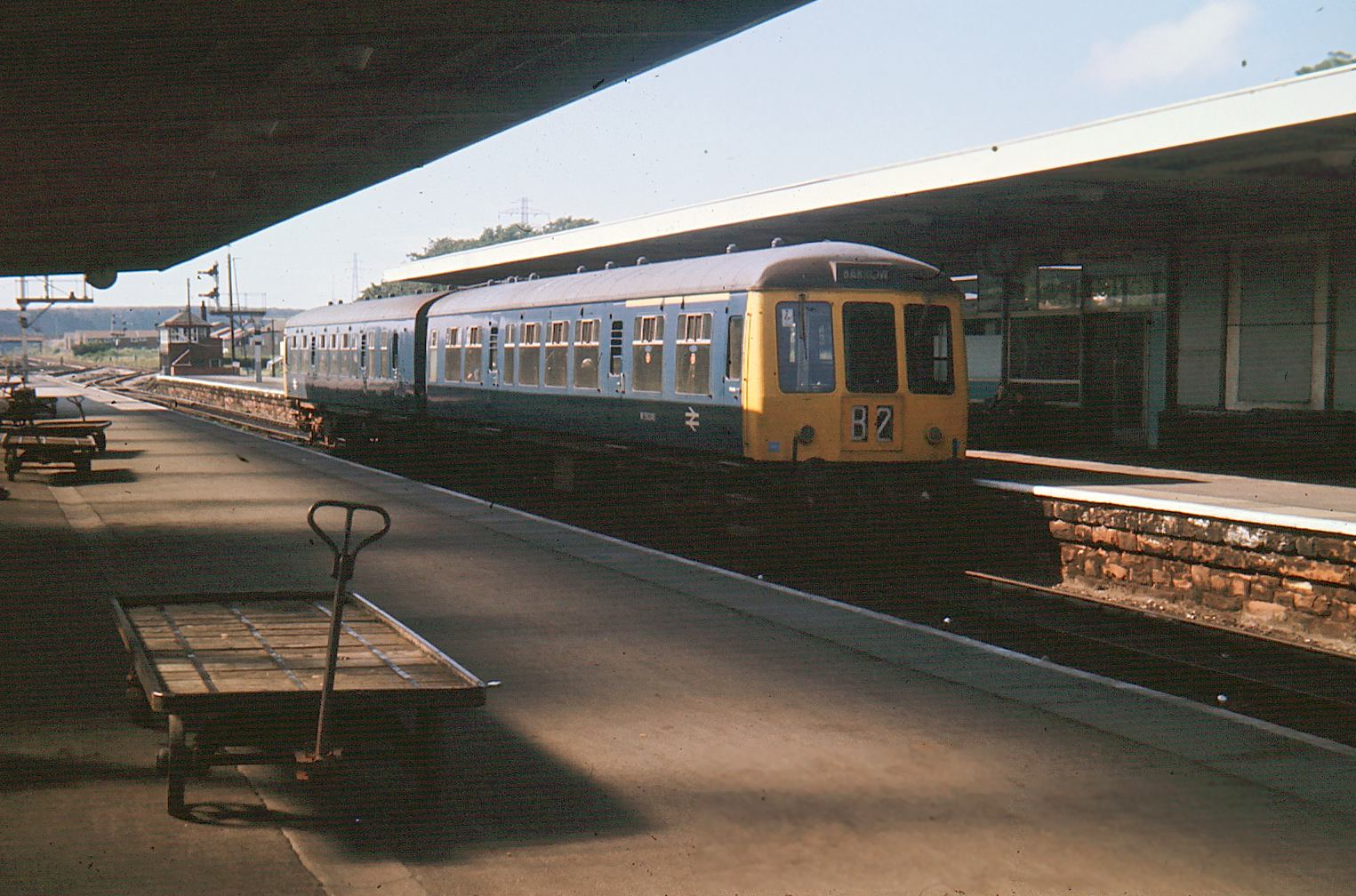
Looking north-west towards Carlisle, photographed in September 1976

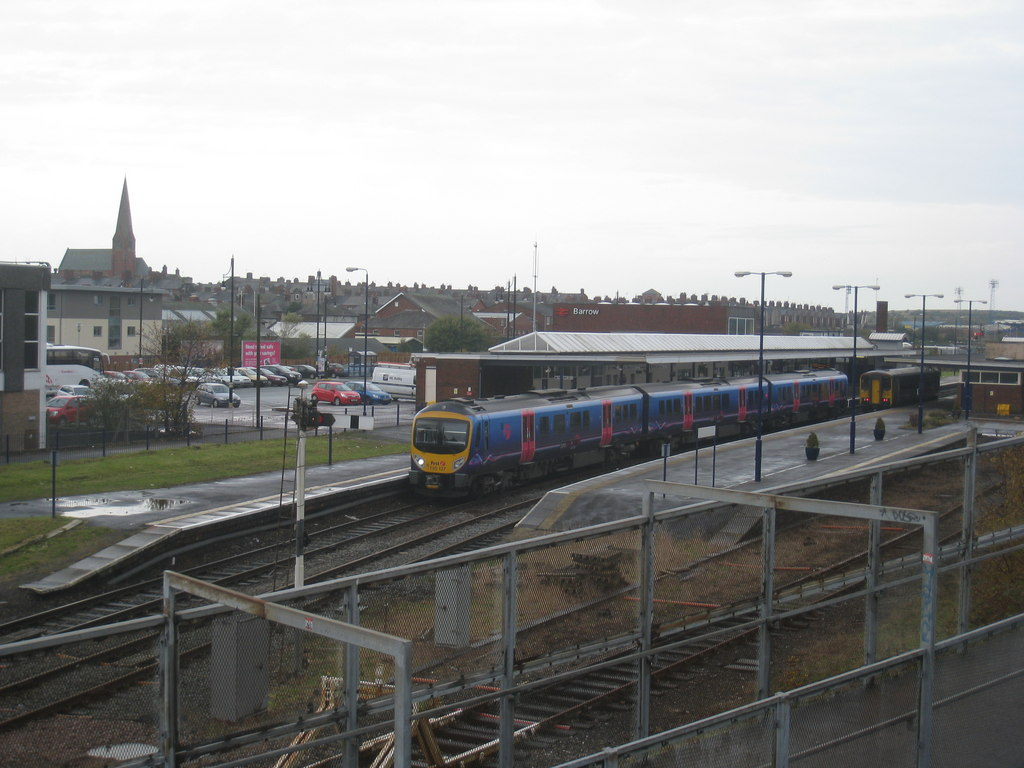
The station viewed from Abbey Road, photographed in 2010

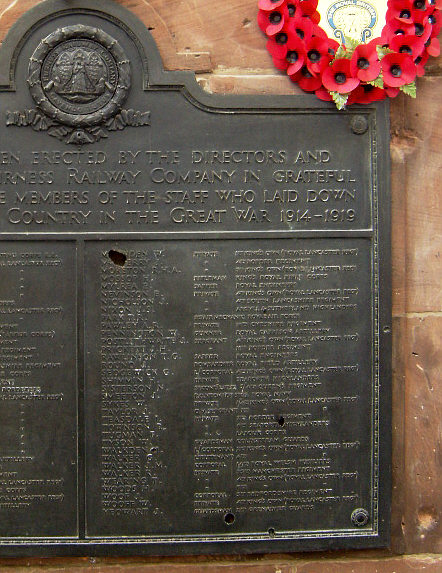
The station's World War I memorial also shows damage from World War II bombing
