= Broughton-in-Furness railway station =

Disused railway station in Cumbria, England

Broughton-in-Furness
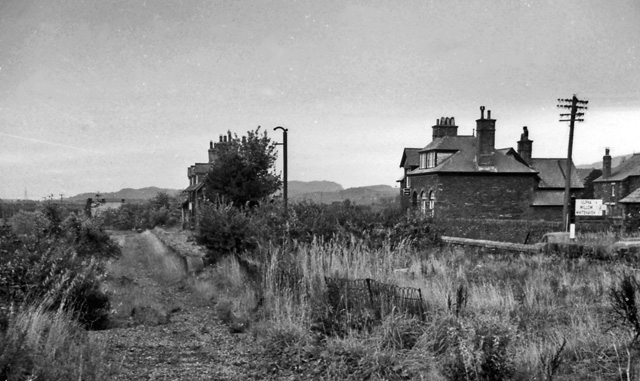
- Station remains in 1966

General information
- Location: Broughton-in-Furness, Westmorland and Furness; England
- Coordinates: 54.276°N 3.212°W
- Grid reference: SD2187
- Platforms: 1 (2 after 1903)

Other information
- Status: Disused

History
- Original company: Coniston Railway
- Pre-grouping: Furness Railway
- Post-grouping: London Midland and Scottish Railway

Key dates
- 1848: Station opened as a terminus
- June 1859: Line extended to Coniston
- 6 October 1958: Station closed to passengers
- 30 April 1962: Station closed completely
Location
- Location within the former South Lakeland district Location within Cumbria

Broughton-in-Furness railway station served the market town of Broughton-in-Furness, in Lancashire, England (now in Cumbria). It was on the branch line to Coniston.

== History ==
In 1848 the Furness Railway extended its line from Barrow to Kirkby-in-Furness to nearby Broughton-in-Furness with the intention of serving local copper mines. Authorised by Parliament in August 1857 the extension to Coniston was open less than two years later, in June 1859. British Railways closed the station and the branch to passengers in 1958 and goods in 1962.

The station building remains.

| Preceding station | Disused railways | Following station |
|---|---|---|
| Foxfield; Line closed, station open | Furness Railway; Coniston Railway | Woodland; Line and station closed |
