= Woodland, Cumbria =

Hamlet in Cumbria, England

Coordinates: 54.292°N 3.158°W

Woodland
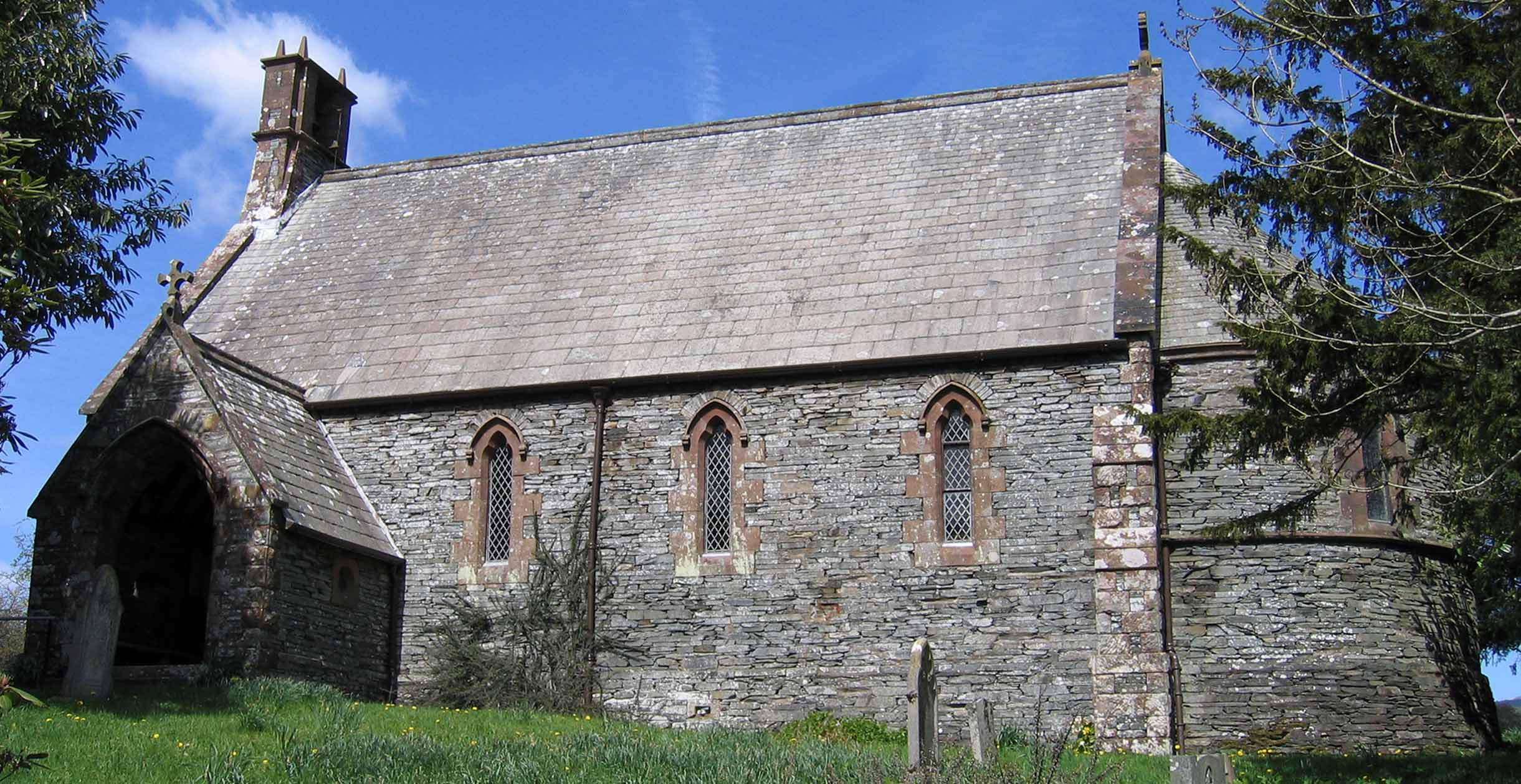
- Anglican Church of St John the Evangelist in Woodland

- Location in South Lakeland Location within Cumbria
- OS grid reference: SD246891
- Civil parish: Kirkby Ireleth
- Unitary authority: Westmorland and Furness
- Ceremonial county: Cumbria
- Region: North West
- Country: England
- Sovereign state: United Kingdom
- Post town: BROUGHTON-IN-FURNESS
- Postcode district: LA20
- Dialling code: 01229
- Police: Cumbria
- Fire: Cumbria
- Ambulance: North West
- UK Parliament: Barrow and Furness

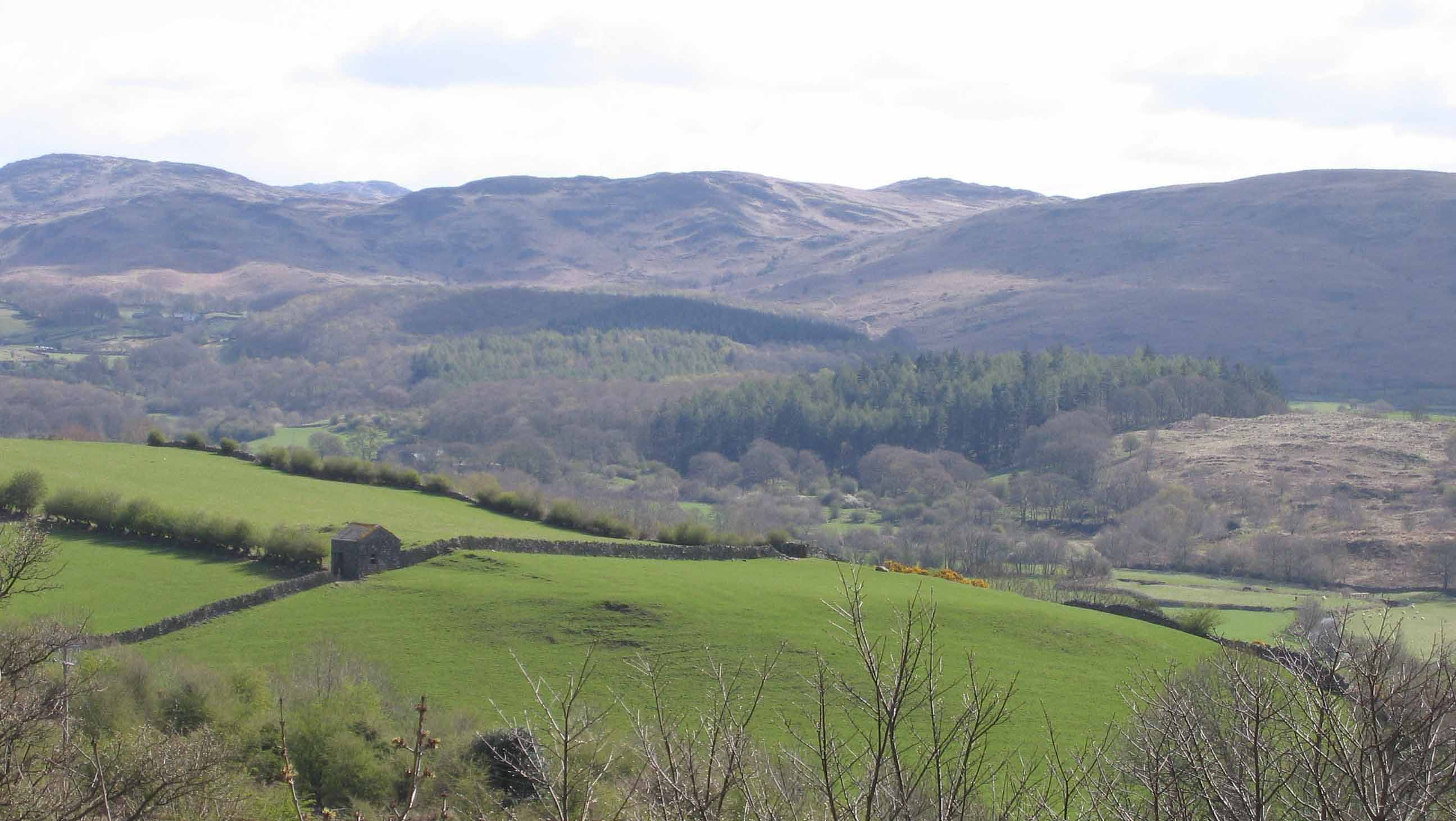
Panoramic view of the valley in which Woodland lies

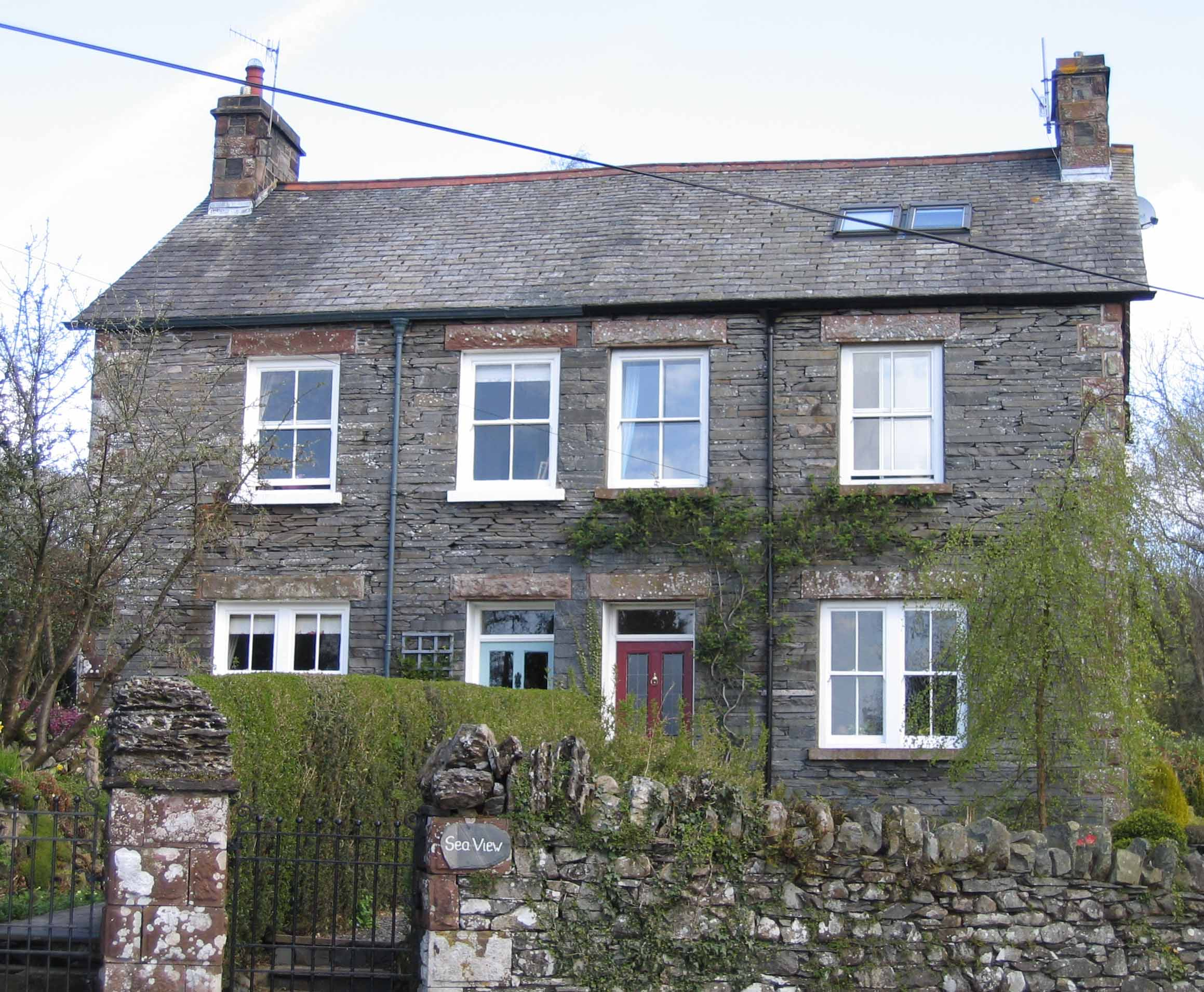
Seaview Cottages at Woodland (#2 is known as "The Old Post Office")

Woodland is a dispersed hamlet within the civil parish of Kirkby Ireleth in the Furness region of Cumbria, England, and is located in the southern part of the Lake District National Park, west of Coniston Water, between Torver and Broughton-in-Furness.

Woodland was served by the Woodland Railway Station which was on the now disused and lifted branch line to Coniston. This station was opened with the line in June 1859, and closed by British Railways to passengers in 1958 and goods in 1962. Today the station building is a private residence.

Woodland was also served by the Aulthurstside Primary School, which was endowed and first documented in 1724 when its master was nominated by the minister, trustees and sidesmen. In 1828 the current school house was erected by subscription, but by 1947, there were only eleven pupils, and it was closed. Today the school house is a private residence and, as of 2012, a Caravan Club site with five pitches. A Baptist Meeting House was supposedly built in the vicinity in the 17th century, and has also long since been closed.

Woodland is today served only by the Anglican Church of Saint John the Evangelist from St Mary Magdalene's Church, Broughton-in-Furness in the Diocese of Carlisle, Cumbria. The church building was erected in 1864–65 and parsonage in 1868–69, both to the design of the architect Edward Graham Paley. Previous buildings were erected on the same site in 1698 and 1822. This building is not included on the National Heritage List for England.

From 1900 to 1906, Sea View Cottages in Woodland was the summer residence of the artist, Henry Robinson Hall and family.
