= Woodland railway station =

Disused railway station in Cumbria, England

Woodland
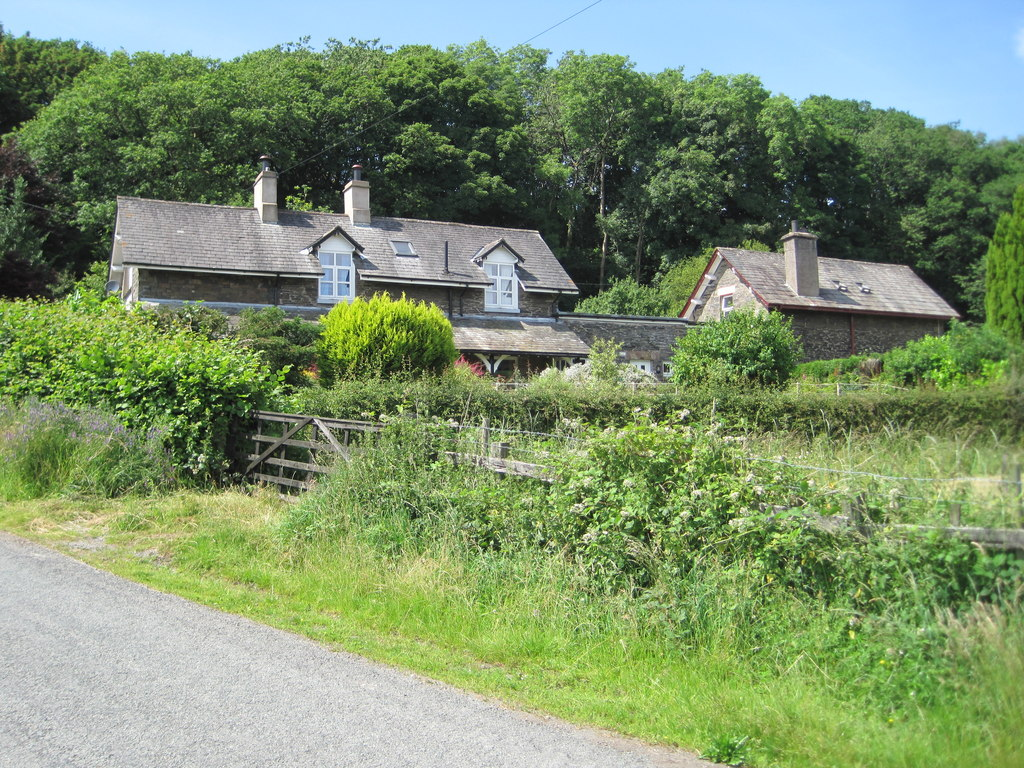
- The site of the station in 2013

General information
- Location: Woodland, Cumbria, South Lakeland; England
- Coordinates: 54.3036°N 3.1678°W
- Grid reference: SD2489
- Platforms: 2

Other information
- Status: Disused

History
- Original company: Coniston Railway
- Pre-grouping: Furness Railway
- Post-grouping: London Midland and Scottish Railway

Key dates
- 1859: Station opened
- 6 October 1958: Station closed to passengers
- 30 April 1962: Station closed completely
Location
- Location within the former South Lakeland district Location within Cumbria

Woodland railway station served the hamlet of Woodland, in Lancashire, England (now in Cumbria). It was on the branch line to Coniston.

== History ==
Authorised by Parliament in August 1857 the line to Coniston was open less than two years later in June 1859. British Railways closed the station and the branch to passengers in 1958 and goods in 1962.

The station building remains and is a private residence.

| Preceding station | Disused railways | Following station |
|---|---|---|
| Broughton-in-Furness; Line and station closed | Furness Railway; Coniston Railway | Torver; Line and station closed |
