= Foxfield railway station =

Railway station in Cumbria, England

Foxfield
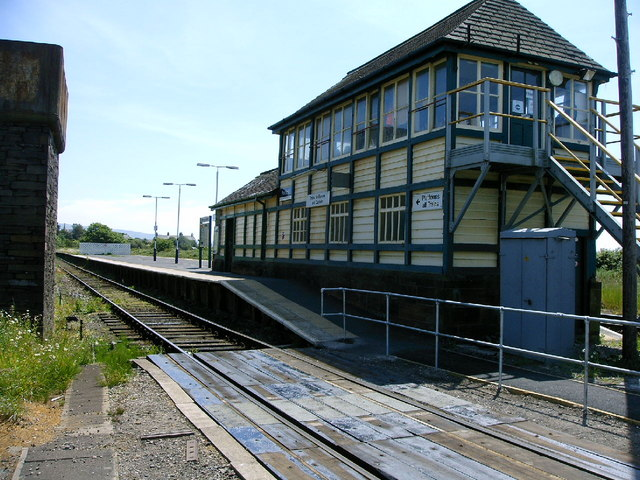

General information
- Location: Foxfield, Westmorland and Furness; England
- Coordinates: 54°15′31″N 3°12′58″W
- Grid reference: SD208854
- Owner: Network Rail
- Manager: Northern Trains
- Platforms: 2
- Tracks: 2

Other information
- Station code: FOX
- Classification: DfT category F2

History
- Original company: Furness Railway
- Pre-grouping: Furness Railway
- Post-grouping: London, Midland and Scottish Railway; British Rail (London Midland Region)

Key dates
- 1 August 1848: Opened as Foxfield Junction
- 1 September 1957: Renamed Foxfield

Passengers
- 2021/22: ▲12,470
- 2022/23: ▲13,322
- 2023/24: ▲13,580
- 2024/25: ▲14,572
- 2025/26: ▲15,378
Location
- Location within the former South Lakeland district Location within Cumbria
Notes
- Passenger statistics from the Office of Rail and Road

Foxfield is a railway station on the Cumbrian Coast Line, which runs between Carlisle and Barrow-in-Furness. The station, situated 11 1/2 miles (19 km) north of Barrow-in-Furness, serves the villages of Broughton-in-Furness and Foxfield in Cumbria. It is owned by Network Rail and managed by Northern Trains.

== History ==
The station dates from 1848, when the Furness Railway extended its line from Barrow-in-Furness to Kirkby-in-Furness to nearby Broughton-in-Furness with the intention of serving local copper mines. It was opened on 1 August 1848 and consisted of an island platform.

Two years later, the Whitehaven and Furness Junction Railway completed its line down the coast from Whitehaven to join the Furness Railway from Barrow-in-Furness, making Foxfield a junction of some importance in the process. The line from Broughton was extended further northwards to Coniston by the Coniston Railway Company on 18 June 1859, although it was not long before the Furness took it over (along with the W&FJR – both companies having been absorbed by the FR by 1865).

In 1879 an enlarged station was built, designed by the Lancaster architects Paley and Austin and built by the Barrow contractor William Ormandy. The island platform was widened to 29 feet (9 m), and a new canopy for passengers was provided.

For much of its life the Coniston line was well-used by locals and visitors alike, with the branch passenger service connecting with main line trains at one end of the route and with steamer services on Coniston Water at the other. However it fell victim to road competition in the late 1950s, passenger services being withdrawn from 6 October 1958, and the line closing completely in 1962. The coast line remains in operation though, with the passenger trains supplemented by a number of freight services running to and from the nuclear reprocessing plant at Sellafield, operated by Direct Rail Services.

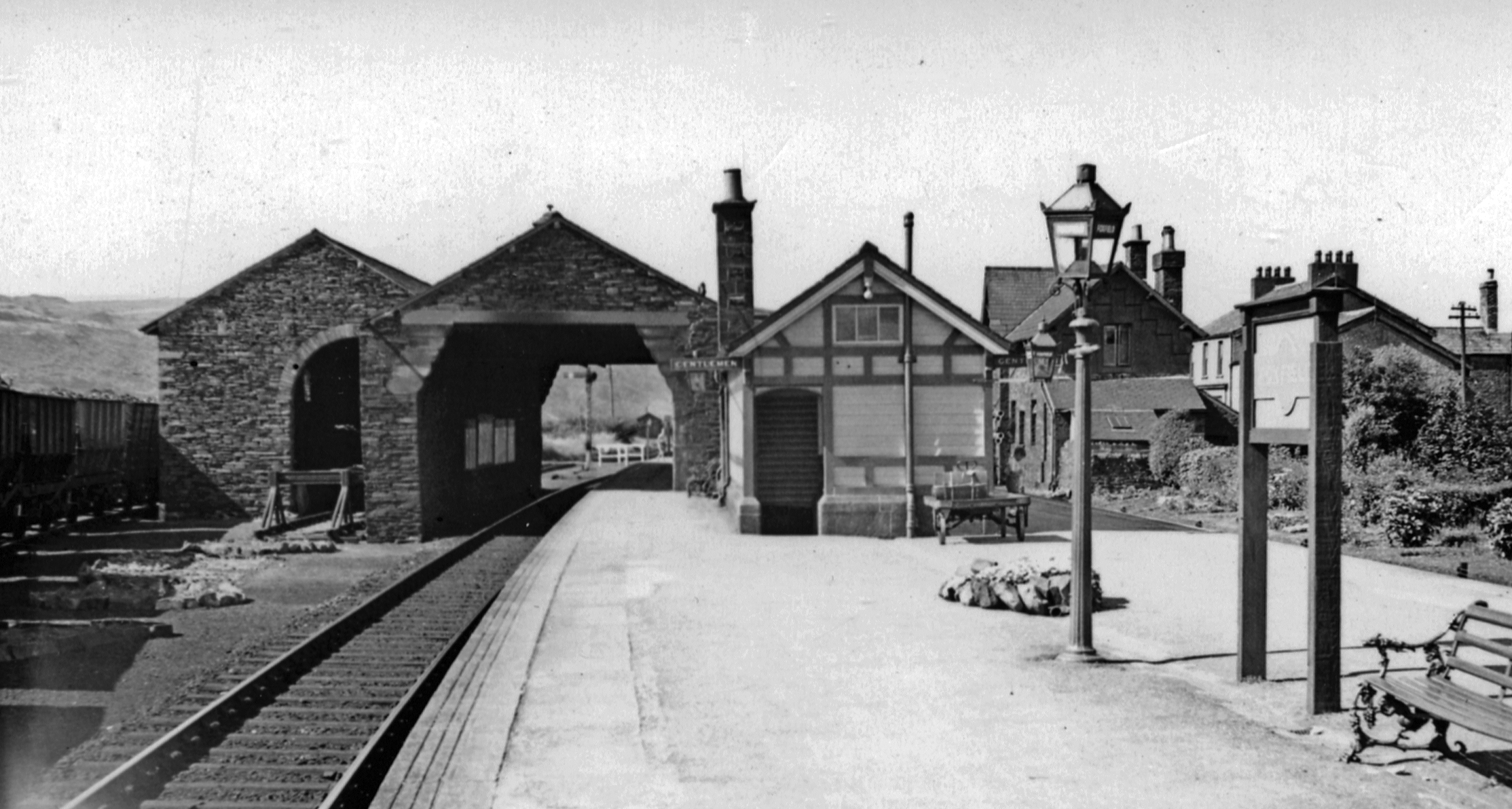
The station, as photographed in August 1951.

Though the platform buildings have mostly been demolished, the timber signal box and attached waiting shelter is still in use. The old water tower and main building on the opposite side of the southbound line also still stand.

== Facilities ==
The station is unstaffed, but has now been equipped with a ticket vending machine to allow travellers to purchase tickets prior to joining the train. Train running details are available by telephone, digital information displays and timetable posters; the National Rail website also states that public wi-fi access is available there. Step-free access to the platform is via a foot level crossing by the signal box.

== Services ==
There is an approximately hourly service in each direction from the station on Monday to Saturdays – southwards to Barrow-in-Furness and northwards to Millom. Most northbound ones run through to and from Whitehaven and Carlisle though one runs as far as Sellafield. A few trains continue beyond Barrow-in-Furness to Lancaster or to Preston.

A Sunday service was introduced at the May 2018 timetable change - the first for more than forty years.

Preceding station	National Rail	Following station
Green Road	Northern Trains; Cumbrian Coast Line	Kirkby-in-Furness
	Historical railways	
Broughton-in-Furness	Coniston Railway	Terminus
Terminus	Furness Railway	Kirkby-in-Furness
Green Road	Whitehaven and Furness Junction Railway	Terminus

== Sources ==
- Andrews, Michael; Holme, Geoff (2005), The Coniston Railway, Pinner: Cumbrian Railways Association, ISBN 0-9540232-3-4
- Marshall, J. (1981), Forgotten Railways: North-West England, Newton Abbott: David & Charles, ISBN 0-7153-8003-6
