= Coniston railway station =

Coniston railway station may refer to:

- Coniston railway station (England)
- Coniston railway station, New South Wales
