= Listed buildings in Askam and Ireleth =

Askam and Ireleth is a civil parish in Westmorland and Furness, Cumbria, England. It contains twelve listed buildings that are recorded in the National Heritage List for England. Of these, two are listed at Grade II*, the middle of the three grades, and the others are at Grade II, the lowest grade. The parish contains the villages of Ireleth and Askam-in-Furness and the surrounding countryside. Ireleth is the older village and is on a hillside to the east of the railway. Askam-in-Furness is on more level ground to the west of the railway. The listed buildings consists of houses in Ireleth, buildings in Askam railway station, a church, a drinking fountain, and a house, farmhouses and farm buildings in the countryside.

== Key ==
Grade	Criteria
II*	Particularly important buildings of more than special interest
II	Buildings of national importance and special interest

== Buildings ==
Name and location	Photograph	Date	Notes	Grade
Low Brookside; 54.18969°N 3.19393°W	—	1688	The house is roughcast with a slate roof. It has two storeys and three bays, with a wing at the rear and an extension to the left. The doorway has a moulded ashlar surround, a dated lintel and a cornice on moulded and shaped brackets. The windows are 20th-century casements.	II
Gate piers and wall, Marsh Grange; 54.20718°N 3.19547°W	—	Late 17th to early 18th century	The gate piers flank the entrance to the drive. They are in sandstone, and each pier has a moulded plinth, sunken panels with pilasters, a bolection moulded frieze, and a dentilled cornice surmounted by a large ball finial on an ogee pedestal. The wall encloses the garden and is in limestone and slate, and contains two doorways.	II*
High Haume Farmhouse and barn 54.17622°N 3.18341°W	—	Early 18th century	The house and barn are in limestone and slate rubble, the house is mainly rendered, and the roof is in green slate. The house has two storeys with an attic, and two bays, with a single-storey single-bay extension to the left. Steps lead up to a gabled porch, and the windows on the front are casements. At the rear is a stair window, casement windows in the ground floor and attic, sash windows in the upper floor, and there is a horizontally-sliding sash window in the extension. The barn to the right has four bays, and contains doors, a cart entrance with a segmental arch, and ventilation slits.	II
Marsh Grange and Marsh Grange Farmhouse; 54.20726°N 3.19594°W	—	Early 18th century	The earliest part is the rear wing, the front range being added in the late 17th century, and later divided into two dwellings. It is built in rendered stone with slate roofs, and has two storeys. The main range has attics, a plinth, and a front of five bays. The central doorway has a bolection moulded architrave flanked by pilasters, a pulvinated frieze with a keystone, and a cornice, and the windows are cross-mullioned. The windows in the rear wing are sashes. Inside the rear wing is a bressumer and a spiral staircase.	II*
Anvil House; 54.18963°N 3.19448°W	—	Early 18th century	The oldest part of the house is the rear wing, the main block being added at right angles to the front in the early 19th century. The house is pebbledashed with a slate roof. It has two storeys and a front range of three bays, the rear wing being lower. The doorway has an ashlar surround and a cornice on shaped brackets. The windows are sashes with projecting sills and wedge lintels.	II
Brookside; 54.18891°N 3.19310°W	—	Mid 18th century	A farmhouse built round an earlier core, it is stuccoed with a slate roof. There are two storeys, a half-basement and an attic, and has two bays. The central doorway has an architrave, a plain frieze and a pediment. The windows are modern casements in stone surrounds with projecting sills. At the rear is a round-arched stair window and a sash window.	II
Brook Lea; 54.18945°N 3.19386°W	—	Early to mid 19th century	A roughcast house with a slate roof, in two storeys with cellars and an attic. It has three bays and a central porch. Most of the windows on the front are sashes, and there is a casement window under a gablet in the centre of the upper floor. At the rear is a round-headed stair window.	II
St Peter's Church; 54.18702°N 3.19118°W		1865	The church was built for the Duke of Buccleuch and stands in an elevated position. It is built in limestone with sandstone dressings, and has a slate roof. The church consists of a nave with a north porch, and a chancel with a south vestry. In the northeast corner is a bell tower with quoins and a doorway. There is a gable on each side in the bell stage containing three quatrefoils, and on the top is a spire with a weathervane. The tracery in the windows is Geometrical.	II
Signal box and attached walling 54.18882°N 3.20461°W		Late 19th century	The signal box was designed by E. G. Paley for the Furness Railway and stands in the south part of Askam railway station. It has a sandstone basement, the upper storey is part timber framed and part glazed, and it has a hipped slate roof with terracotta cresting. There are external steps on the north side. The attached wall encloses the southwest end of the platform.	II
Station buildings 54.18904°N 3.20475°W	—	1877	The station buildings on the west side of Askam railway station, including the ticket office, waiting rooms and lavatories, were designed by E. G. Paley for the Furness Railway. They are in sandstone with slate roofs. The ticket office is at right angles to the waiting room. It has one storey and an attic on a chamfered plinth, and contains segmentally-arched windows containing casements and a clock. The waiting room has five bays and inside the floor has red and blue tiles.	II
Drinking fountain 54.18859°N 3.20465°W		1897	The drinking fountain commemorates the Diamond Jubilee of Queen Victoria. It is in cast iron on a stone plinth. Four fluted columns support an umbrella-like pierced canopy with a crown finial. The structure is embellished with inscriptions and decorations, including dragons at the corners, and roundels, one depicting the queen, and with herons in the others. Inside the canopy is a fountain with a broad bowl on a clustered column.	II
Waiting room (east); 54.18910°N 3.20448°W	—	Early 20th century	The waiting room on the east side of Askam railway station is in brick, with weather-boarding on the sides and a slate roof. It is in one storey and has a rectangular plan.	II
