= Askam and Ireleth =

Civil parish in Cumbria, England

Coordinates: 54.189°N 3.204°W

- Civil parish
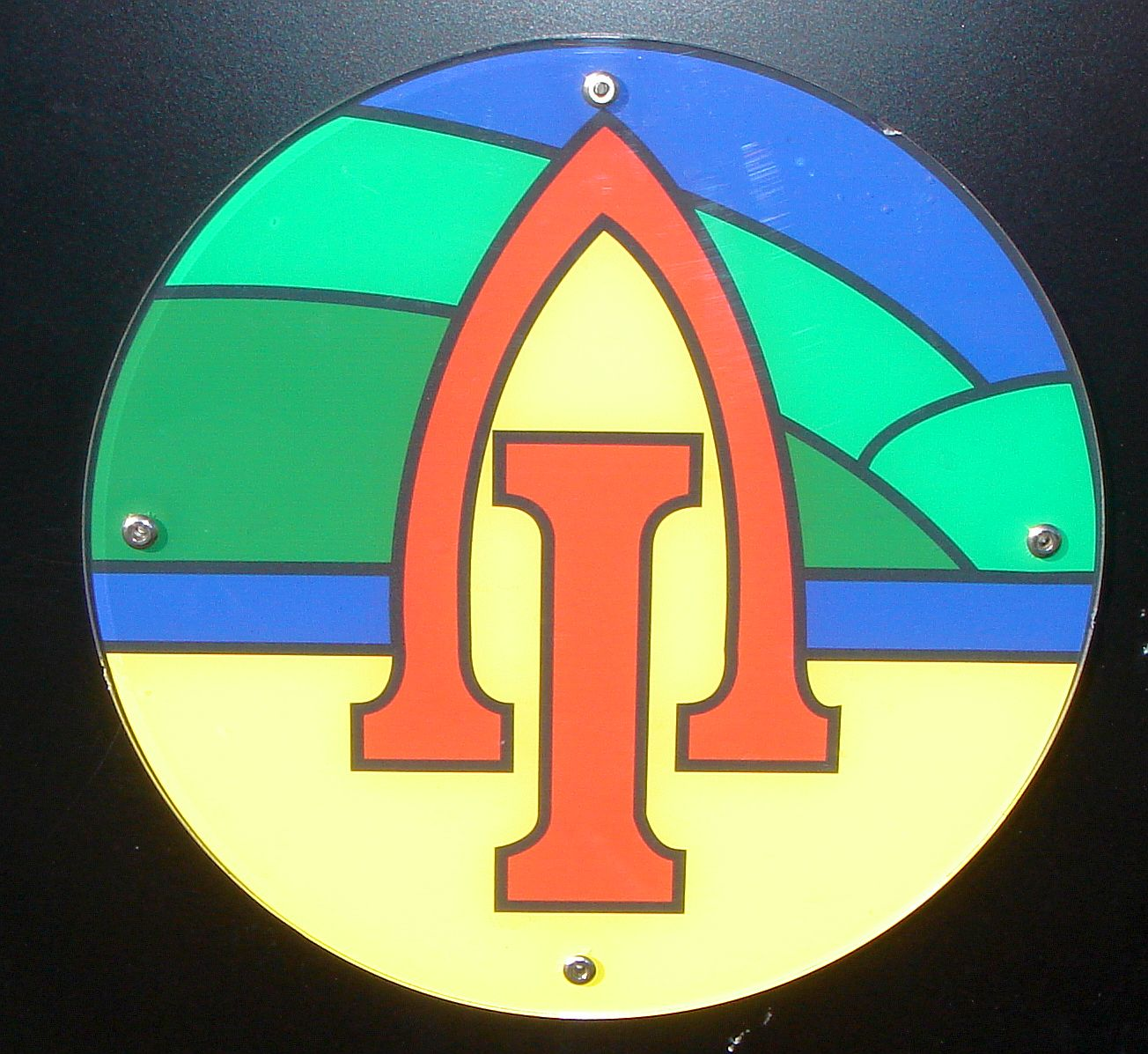
- The parish council logo. The roundel includes the initials of the villages on a symbolic representation of the beach, sea and fells.

- Location in the former Barrow-in-Furness Borough Location within Cumbria
- Population: 3,462 (2011)
- OS grid reference: SD214777
- Civil parish: Askam and Ireleth
- Unitary authority: Westmorland and Furness
- Ceremonial county: Cumbria
- Region: North West
- Country: England
- Sovereign state: United Kingdom
- Post town: ASKAM-IN-FURNESS
- Postcode district: LA16
- Dialling code: 01229
- Police: Cumbria
- Fire: Cumbria
- Ambulance: North West
- UK Parliament: Barrow and Furness

Askam and Ireleth is a civil parish close to Barrow-in-Furness in Westmorland and Furness, Cumbria, England. Historically part of Lancashire, it originally consisted of two separate coastal villages with different origins and histories which, in recent times, have merged to become one continuous settlement. In the 2001 census the parish had a population of 3,632, reducing at the 2011 census to 3,462.

Ireleth has its origins as a mediaeval farming village clustered on the hillside overlooking the flat sands of the Duddon Estuary. Askam was established following the discovery of large quantities of iron ore near the village in the middle of the 18th century.

The pair originally fell within the boundaries of the Hundred of Lonsdale 'north of the sands' in the historic county of Lancashire. Following local government reforms in 1974 the parish became part of the county of Cumbria, and after further reforms in 2023 it became part of Westmorland and Furness.

The nearby River Duddon estuary and surrounding countryside have made the area well known for its wildlife, while the villages' exposed position on the eastern bank facing the Irish Sea have encouraged the establishment of wind energy generation, amid local controversy.

== History ==
=== Ireleth ===
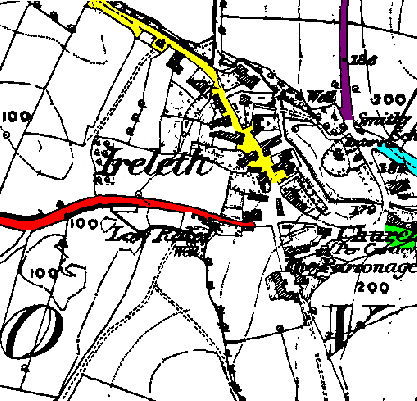
A map from between 1850 and 1873, showing Ireleth

Ireleth is the smaller and older of the two villages, with its origins stretching back to the Viking occupation of Britain. It was originally clustered along a stream, named 'Hole Beck', about half a mile up the hill from the estuary below. It was also the junction of four roads passing through the area. Firstly, there was the 'Sands' road, named 'Marsh Lane' in maps of the 1850s, heading down the hill towards the shore, where it met one of the possible routes for crossing the treacherous tidal sands of the Duddon at low tide. Secondly, there was the lane heading north along a ridge towards Kirkby-in-Furness. Part of these two roads form today's A595 main road. There was also a road leading up the stream's valley towards the hamlet of Marton, and finally a road east over the hills towards Dalton-in-Furness.

Viking origins exist in two forms: remains have been found near St. Peter's parish church and the name of the village itself is Viking, translated from the Old Norse as 'hill-slope of the Irish'. Remains included the long house of “chief Scotch”.

It is thought the village was included in the Domesday Book, compiled soon after the Norman Conquest, but there is debate over which of the entries for the Furness area in William the Conqueror's census actually refers to modern day Ireleth. Several sources name a settlement called Gerleuuorde, part of the Manor of Hougun, as the correct entry but there is no conclusive evidence to support this, not least because of the discrepancies in spelling. Samuel Lewis' A Topological Dictionary of England, written 1848, posits a different contender as the true Ireleth. He claimed Ouregrave referred to the village because of the existence of a mill named Orga-Mill, but he conceded this was also conjecture. Lewis' full text on Ireleth is below.

IRELETH, a chapelry, in the parish of Dalton-In-Furness, union of Ulverston, hundred of Lonsdale north of the Sands, N. division of Lancashire, 3 miles (N.) from Dalton; containing 744 inhabitants. Ogra-Mill, in this township, has been conjectured to be the Ouregrave of the Domesday survey: Roanhead is the point for crossing Dudden sands by the ancient road into Cumberland. Upon the east borders of Ireleth, also called Above Town, are the iron-mines of Whitridge, Lindal Moor, Cross Gates, and Inman Gill, the richest and most productive mines in Furness, with the exception of Cross Gates, the works of which have been suspended. Many thousand tons of ore are raised annually in the township. The living is a perpetual curacy; net income, £100; patron, the Vicar of Dalton. The chapel was built in 1608, by Giles Brownrigg, and was originally intended for a school.

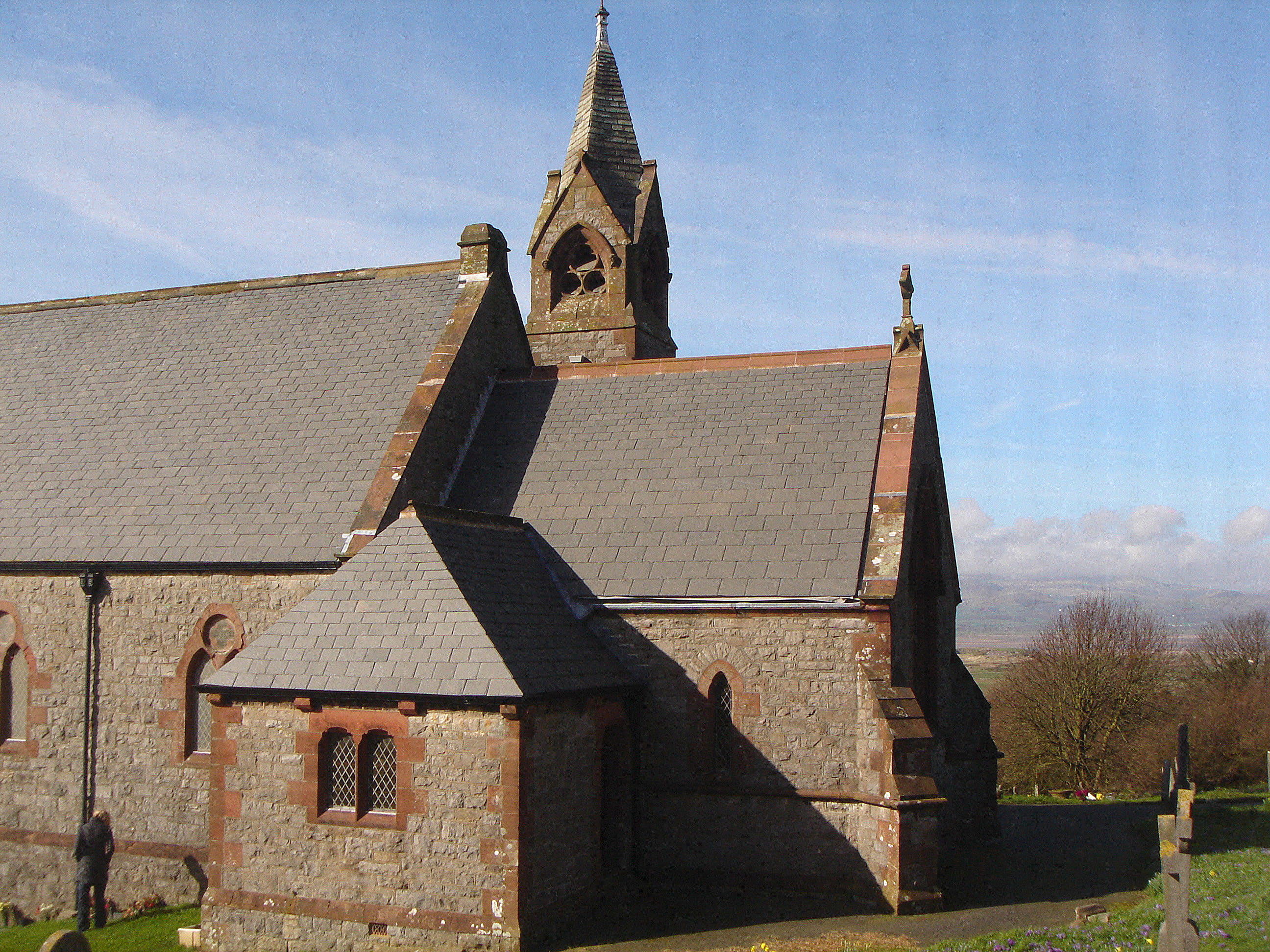
St. Peter's church (CoE), at the top of Ireleth

During the Middle Ages, the entire area was controlled by the Cistercian monks of Furness Abbey. During this time, Ireleth was little more than one of many farming communities in Furness. The iron ore developments of Askam largely bypassed Ireleth, and the village developed slowly, housing farmers and workers from local towns. The religious history of the village is recorded as starting around the year 1608, when an endowment was created to fund a village school. Giles Brownrigg, named variously as a local landowner or a tailor who had left the area to make his fortune in London, gave money to establish a school house and a salary for a schoolmaster. This building existed on what is today Sun Street; the only remains today are a font and a plaque, kept in the modern day school building, inscribed:

Giles Brownrig caused this school house to be builded the 6 yeare of King James ano 1608 and gave a yearly salari to the schole maister for ever [sic]

Ireleth featured in the Imperial Gazetteer of England and Wales. In this, it is said-

IRELETH, a village and a chapelry in Dalton-in-Furness parish, Lancashire. The village stands at a st. of the Furness railway, on the E side of the Duddon sands, 2¾ miles N of Dalton; is a small sub port to Lancaster; and maintains communication across the sands at low water. The chapelry includes also the hamlets of Lindale and Marton; but does not appear to have definite limits. Post town, Dalton-in-Furness. The living is a p. curacy in the diocese of Carlisle. Value, £100.* Patron, the Vicar of Dalton. The church stands on an eminence, overlooking the Duddon.

Ireleth did not have a parish church at this point, falling into the 'Above Town' area, together with the hamlets of Marton and Lindal, of the parish of Dalton-in-Furness. Lacking a place of worship, it was decided the newly built school could also be put to use as a chapel. Fishwick's 'Lancashire & Cheshire Church Surveys, 1649–1655' of 1849 cites this record from a church survey taken in 1650:

That the Chappell of Irleth is not farr distant from its parish Church [Dalton in Furness], but neare enough thereto, and was onely built for a schoole, and some for their perticuler ease would have the same made a Chappell [sic]

In 1860, Ireleth, along with the newly founded Askam, petitioned for the creation of its own parish following the rapid increase in population. Construction of a parish church began, with the money to build St. Peter's coming from the new-found profits of iron ore mining, giving rise to the name the 'Iron Church'. It was dedicated for use on St. Peter's Day, 29 June 1865, but approval for a new ecclesiastical parish of 'Ireleth-with-Askam' did not come until almost ten years later in 1874.

=== Askam ===
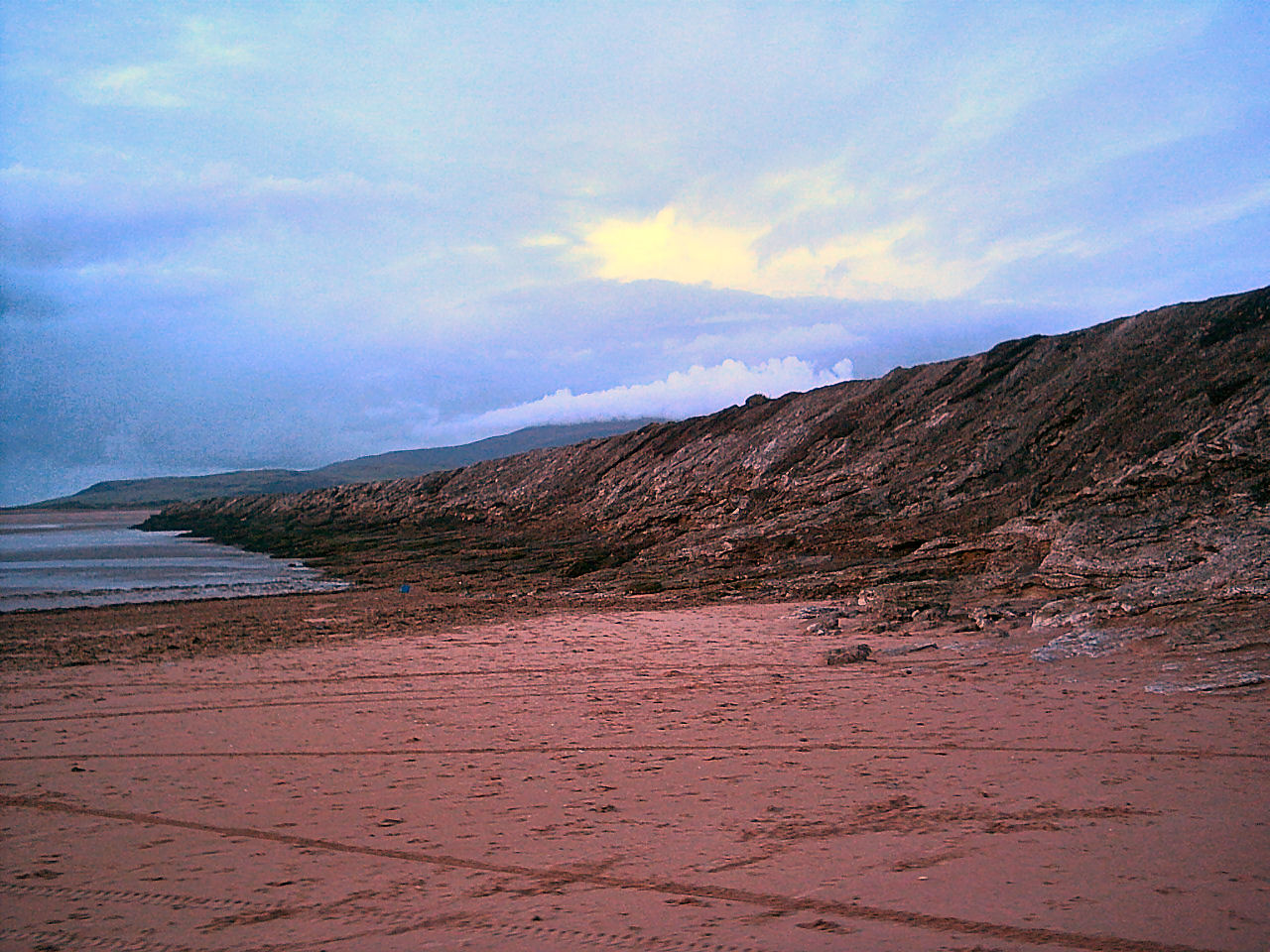
The south side of the pier

Askam's history starts much more recently. In 1850, iron ore deposits were discovered in the area by Henry Schneider. These turned out to be the second largest iron ore deposits in the country, with over 7 million tons of ore extracted. By 1896, 547 men were employed in the pits by the village and in nearby Roanhead, 347 of them underground. Several hundred others worked in local mines at Mouzell (between Ireleth and Dalton-in-Furness), Roanhead and Dalton. Some were owned by the Kennedy Brothers Ltd. firm of Ulverston Barrow Haematite Steel Co and the Millom and Askam Iron Company. The latter built four blast furnaces in the village to smelt the iron ore being brought from mines all over the peninsula by rail. The village continued to grow with terraced houses and allotments erected for the flood of immigrant labour needed to work the mines. They came from all parts of the British Isles, with a large proportion coming from existing mining areas in Cornwall and Ireland. The Cornish in particular tended to bring their families and settle, while the Irish often moved on to wherever there was work. Others came from areas where Askam's mine owners had other concerns, such as Scotland and Wales.

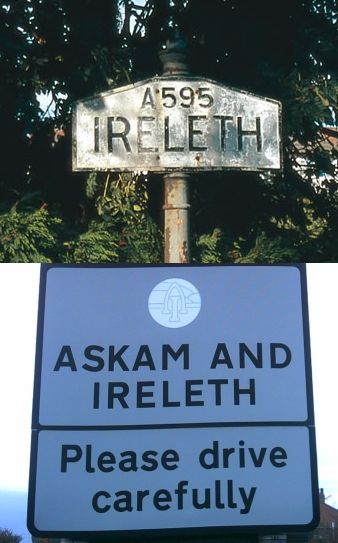
An old Ireleth sign with a modern combined sign

Remnants of the steel industry remain in Askam, as evidenced by a pier, consisting of slag from the works, that juts out into the bay toward Millom. Also, numerous streets are named after the industry and its owners. For example, 'Steel Street' is so named because of the steel industry; 'Sharp Street' is named after Joseph Sharp, one of the earliest people involved in Askam's steel industry; and 'Crossley Street' after William Crossley, an early investor in the Askam steel industry. The large numbers of slag banks left by the steel industry around the village are now important sites for wildlife. By 1918, the iron ore had run out and most of the industrial buildings were demolished in 1933. Since then, Askam has grown with commuter homes, exploiting the views over the Duddon Estuary to the Lake District.

=== Askam and Ireleth ===
Askam and Ireleth are both part of the Furness peninsula, where the suffix "-in-Furness" is sometimes added to place names, such as Barrow-in-Furness and Dalton-in-Furness. Askam, when referred to on its own, often uses this but it is rare for Ireleth to be called Ireleth-in-Furness.

However, Ireleth is often confused in archival records with 'Kirkby Ireleth', the former name for the community (two miles to the north) now known as Kirkby-in-Furness. These communities are differentiated in the Imperial Gazetteer of England and Wales.

While the strip development has effectively created one larger community in the past fifty years, residents of both villages still retain a strong sense of being either from Askam or Ireleth. Road signs read 'Askam and Ireleth' on entering the villages by road, but an older 'A595 – Ireleth' sign still stands on the former boundary between the two.

In administration terms, the civil parish of which they are both part uses the name Askam with Ireleth, as does the local Women's Institute (WI) which had previously been called Ireleth WI. The parish was formed in 1987 from the unparished area of Dalton-in-Furness.

== Governance ==
Askam and Ireleth is part of the Barrow and Furness parliamentary constituency, represented by Labour Party MP Michelle Scrogham.

For Local Government purposes it is administered by Westmorland and Furness Council.

The villages have their own parish council; Askam and Ireleth Parish Council.

== Environment ==
The upper slopes of the hill near Ireleth are home to dark blue slate, and it is found on the roofs of several local dwellings. Haematite, the bright red iron ore, was discovered in an exceptionally large deposit, the second largest in the country, south of the current villages in the 1840s. Askam sprung up on the Ireleth marshes as a home for the miners attacking the new deposit. The other mineral found in large quantities, conveniently with a commercial use, is shale. This is fired with water to make red brick, and the brickworks, which is still operational today, was built in 1845 to exploit this.

Much wildlife is found on the Duddon Estuary, including 20% of the national natterjack toad population, who are attracted to the shallow breeding pools. The slagbanks around Askam are also very important as nesting sites for the rare Sandwich terns that live in the area. The beach is designated a Site of Special Scientific Interest (SSSI) because of the range of flora and fauna present on the sands.

The Askam and Ireleth Wind Farm can be found 1.25 miles (2 km) east of the village, on the southern slopes of Hare Slack Hill. Work on the turbines started in late 1998, and the wind farm took eight months to complete.

The Marton, Askam and Ireleth Windfarm Action Group was one of the first such organisations in the UK dedicated to fighting windfarm development.

== Location and transport ==
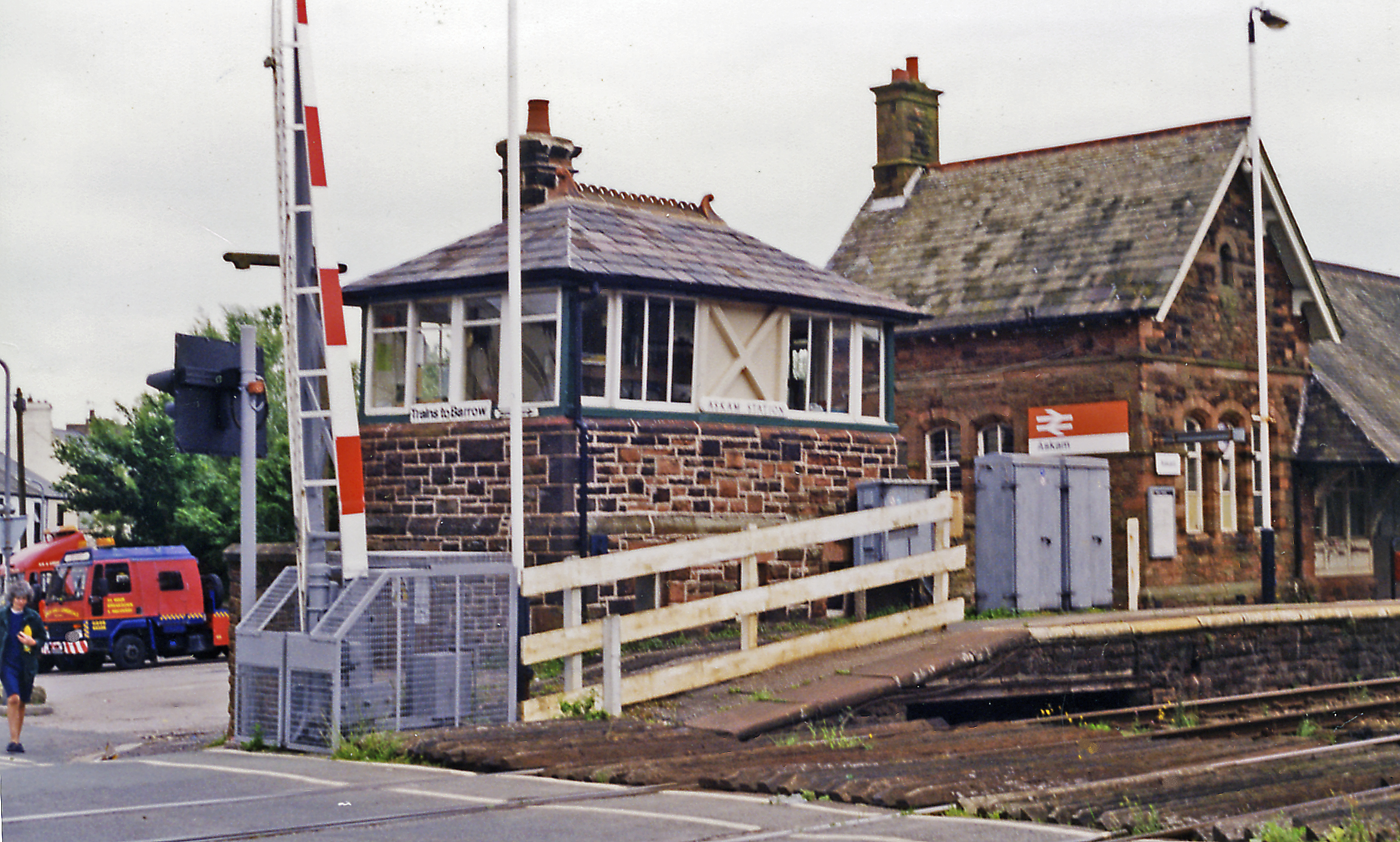
Askam station and level crossing

The A595 is the main coastal route, designated a primary route, connecting Dalton and Carlisle via the Cumbrian Coast. Its southern end is 2 miles (3 km) south of Askam at the junction with the A590 Dalton-in-Furness bypass although formerly continued into Dalton. The area is served by the Blueworks X7 bus service on Wednesdays only. There are plans to construct a crossing over the Duddon between Askam and Millom to reduce the long journey times between Furness and Copeland, due to the circuitous route of the A595 around the estuary. A scheme to build such a 'Duddon Crossing' remains at the planning stage, but is nominated as a future project in county transport planning.

The railway line passes through the two villages virtually bisecting them, with a bridge and a level crossing by the station allowing people to cross the line. There is a stop called Askam Railway Station. Services run south to Barrow and some continue on to the West Coast Mainline at Carnforth. To the north the line links to the Sellafield nuclear power plant, a major local employer, and onwards to Carlisle.

Askam is located on the 150 miles (241 km) Cumbrian Coastal Walk, which winds around the edge of the county.

== Sport ==
The villages have several sporting facilities, including the Fallowfield Park rugby league ground, home of Askam Amateur Rugby league Football Club, known as the Sandrats. Formed on September 13, 1879, the amateur club is a member of British Amateur Rugby League Association and in 2007–2008 were elected to the National Conference League Division 2, but withdrew before the start of the season. There is Askam United Football Club who play in the West Lancashire Football League Division Two and Duddon SC, a cricket team based at the old K Shoes factory social club, now called Duddon Sports and Social Club. There is also a newly formed junior football team and due to playing on the Sports Club pitches, has taken the name of Duddon Sports Junior Football Club.

A 10-hole links golf course, belonging to the Dunnerholme Golf Club, lies to the north of Askam. The course has one particularly interesting feature, namely a green atop Dunnerholme Rock, a large uneroded limestone rock which stands out from the surrounding flat course and sands. The golf club has been in existence since 1905. There’s a Wado kai karate club that’s ran down at the community centre.

== Public buildings ==
=== Village halls ===
Askam and Ireleth has four village halls: Temperance Hall in Ireleth, Askam Community Centre (formerly part of Askam School) which was refurbished in 2010, Band Hall in Sandy Lane, the home of Askam & Ireleth Silver Band, the local brass band, and venue for dances, and Rankin Hall in Askam. Temperance Hall was built by the Quakers in 1872; it was marked as a place of worship on Ordnance Survey maps of the late 19th century, and was used by the Bible Christians, a Methodist denomination. It later fell out of use as a religious centre, being marked on maps in 1913 as simply a hall. The Temperance Hall was closed before being renovated in the 1990s, and is now used as a community centre and the location of parish council alternate months with the Rankin Hall, which is also the meeting place for the local Women's Institute.

=== Churches ===
St Peter's Church overlooks the two villages atop Ireleth Hill, and is the oldest of the churches in the villages, and holds the only churchyard in the villages. It adjoins the local cemetery, and the Temperance Hall that was once used as a church. There are three other places of worship within the village.

In 1907, at a cost of £350, the Christian Meeting House was built on Crossley Street in Askam, as a Church of Christ Church. This became, in 1956, St. Anthony's Catholic Church, but it was due to close by the end of 2009. On Duddon Road, in Askam, there is also a Methodist Church, called Duddon Road Church. This is a shared building with the Church of England and is the headquarters of the local scouts, cubs, beavers, rainbows and brownies.

There were once two other churches in the village, but they are no longer in use as Churches. Zion, on Beach Street, Askam, was a Primitive Methodist church that was founded in 1870. It closed in 1985. There was also a United Methodist Church in Askam, and though the building still stands on Duke Street, it is now used as a social club. The Church was opened in 1878, on land that was donated by the Furness Iron and Steel Company, and became the Rankin Hall (see above). The Gospel hall on Duke Street closed some five years ago.

=== Schools ===
There are two schools, Ireleth St Peter's Church of England Primary School and Askam Village School, both of which are primary schools.

=== Other buildings ===
There is a lifeboat station, home of the Duddon Inshore Rescue, that was established in 1970.

Askam has a fountain commemorating Queen Victoria's Jubilee.

There is a public library in Lord Street in Askam. It was originally built in 1904 as a reading room branch of Dalton-in-Furness Library.

== See also ==
- Listed buildings in Askam and Ireleth
