= Askam and Ireleth Wind Farm =

Wind farm in Cumbria, England

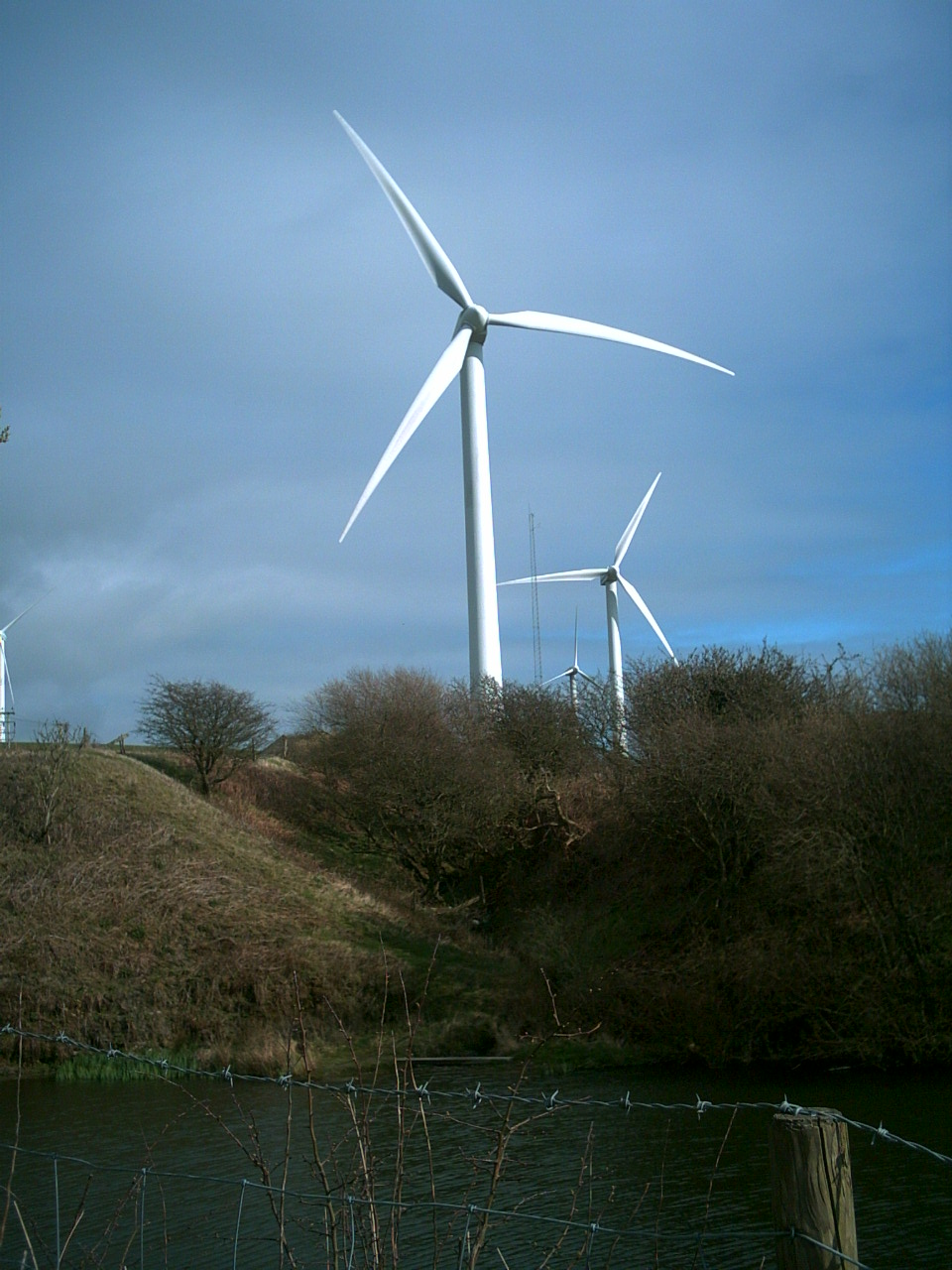
- Country: England, United Kingdom
- Location: Askam and Ireleth
- Coordinates: 54°11′14″N 03°10′20″W
- Status: Operational
- Construction began: 1998
- Commission date: July 1999
- Operator: B9 Energy

Power generation
- Units operational: 7 x 0.66 MW
- Make and model: Vestas: V47
- Nameplate capacity: 4.62 MW

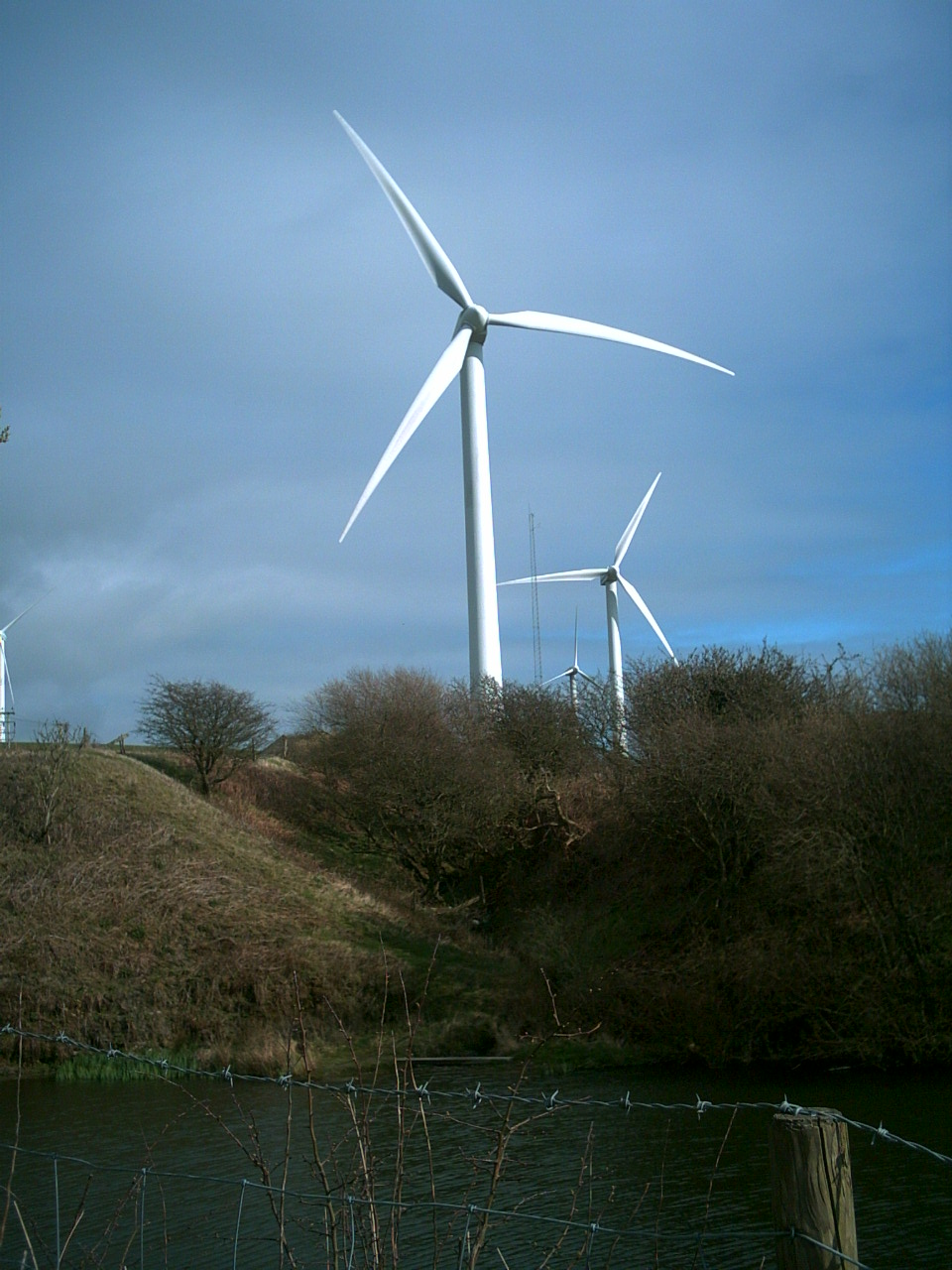
Some of the wind turbines.

Askam and Ireleth Wind Farm is a group of 7 turbines located two kilometers east of the village Askam and Ireleth, on the southern slopes of Hare Slack Hill. Work on the turbines started in late 1998, and the wind farm took eight months to complete. It first generated energy in July, 1999.

== Description ==
Recent reports show the windfarm is producing only 30.2% of the theoretical maximum amount of electricity claimed by then-operators Powergen in the planning application.

E.ON, developer and owner, claims that the wind farm generated enough renewable electricity in 2005 to supply nearly 2,500 homes and avoided the emission of over 4,000 tonnes of carbon dioxide. The wind farm, which features seven turbines measuring 40 metres (131 ft) to the top of the tower, is not permanently staffed. Instead it is controlled and monitored from Rheidol Hydroelectric Power Station, near Aberystwyth, Mid Wales.

== Local opposition to the windfarm ==
The Marton, Askam and Ireleth Windfarm Action Group (MAIWAG) was formed by local residents of the three villages upset by what they saw as the inconsiderate construction of the windfarm by then developers Wind Prospect. The group claimed the reality of the windfarm at Far Old Park farm bore little resemblance to the proposed scheme they were first told about. Their main concerns related to the size and environmental impact of the development as well as noise it produced. It was discovered that six of the seven turbines were not constructed in line with the developer's original application and as such did not have planning permission. Barrow Borough Council signed an agreement with the developer, imposing a range of planning conditions on the turbines already built. As complaints by local residents continued to be made about the noise the council resolved to take action against the windfarm. Later, borough councillors decided to drop this planned enforcement action in December 2002. Disappointed by this decision, six members of the group went ahead with a private prosecution against the owners and operators of the windfarm on the grounds it was a "noise nuisance". But their case was unsuccessful.

Members of the group later toured the country to share their experiences and aid other countryside defence groups in their fight against excessive windfarm development.
