= Green Road railway station =

Railway station in Cumbria, England

Green Road
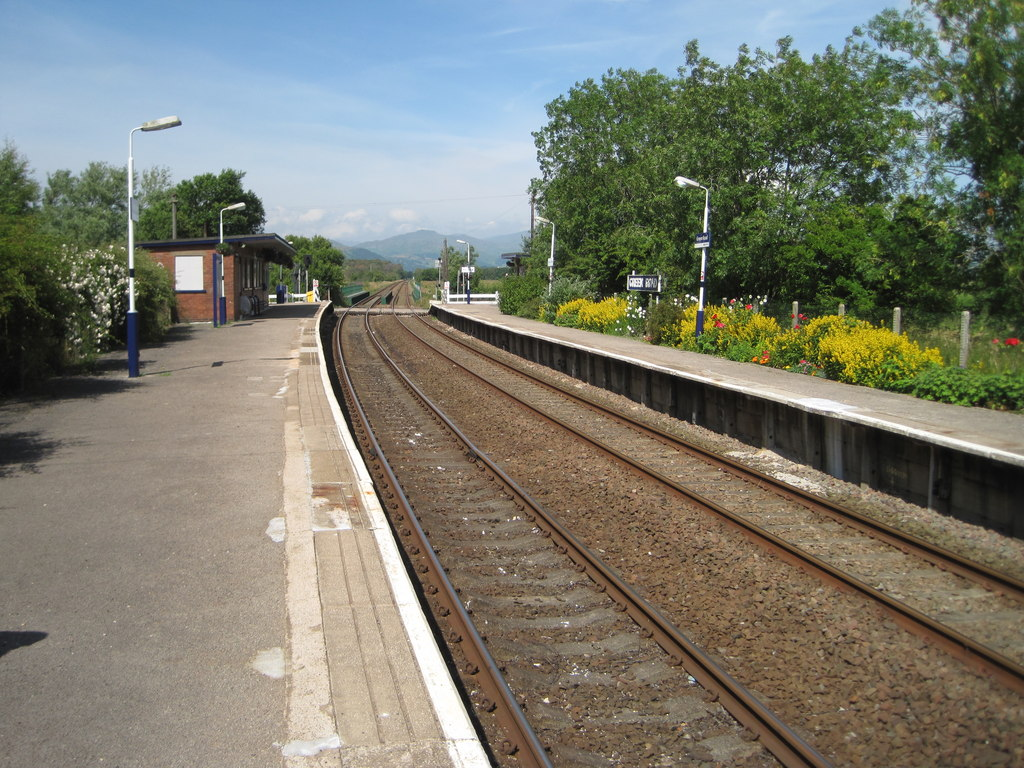

General information
- Location: Millom Without, Cumberland; England
- Coordinates: 54°14′40″N 3°14′43″W
- Grid reference: SD189839
- Owner: Network Rail
- Manager: Northern Trains
- Platforms: 2
- Tracks: 2

Other information
- Station code: GNR
- Classification: DfT category F2

History
- Original company: Whitehaven and Furness Junction Railway
- Pre-grouping: Furness Railway
- Post-grouping: London, Midland and Scottish Railway; British Rail (London Midland Region)

Key dates
- 1 November 1850: Opened

Passengers
- 2021/22: ▲6,430
- 2022/23: ▲7,208
- 2023/24: ▼7,050
- 2024/25: ▲7,480
- 2025/26: ▼6,146
Location
- Location within the former Borough of Copeland Location within Cumbria
Notes
- Passenger statistics from the Office of Rail and Road

Green Road is a railway station on the Cumbrian Coast Line, which runs between Carlisle and Barrow-in-Furness. The station, situated 13 1/2 miles (22 km) north-west of Barrow-in-Furness, serves the civil parish of Millom Without in Cumbria. It is owned by Network Rail and managed by Northern Trains.

Green Road has been adopted since 1981 and is currently a member of Northern Trains' station adoption scheme. The station has won a number of awards for its gardens.

== Facilities ==
The station is not staffed but has now been provided with a ticket vending machine (card only) to allow intending travellers to buy tickets before boarding. The brick main building is not in public use, but there are waiting shelters on each side. Step-free access to both platforms is via ramps from the road that crosses the railway here (the automated level crossing is immediately to the south of the station). Train running information is provided by posters, digital display screens and telephone.

== Services ==
Monday to Saturdays there is a roughly hourly service each way, southbound to Barrow-in-Furness and northbound to Millom. Most daytime northbound trains continue to Whitehaven and Carlisle.

A Sunday service was introduced at the May 2018 timetable change – this runs hourly from mid-morning until the evening (though certain trains only run as far as Millom). This is the first such service on the Coast line for more than forty years.

Preceding station	National Rail	Following station
Millom	Northern Trains; Cumbrian Coast Line	Foxfield
	Historical railways	
Millom	Whitehaven and Furness Junction Railway	Foxfield
