= Alexander Craig Gibson =

English surgeon, folklorist and antiquarian

Alexander Craig Gibson (1813–1874) was an English surgeon, folklorist and antiquarian.

== Life ==
Born at Harrington, Cumberland, on 17 March 1813, he was the eldest son of Joseph Gibson by his wife Mary Stuart Craig, from Moffat, Dumfriesshire. He had medical training in Whitehaven, and studied at the University of Edinburgh.

Gibson started in practice at Branthwaite and Ullock in Allerdale, in west Cumberland, for about two years. He moved to Coniston in 1843. In 1849 he removed to Hawkshead, as surgeon to the Coniston copper mines. In 1857, finding the work heavy, he settled at Bebington in Cheshire, where he remained in practice until poor health compelled him to retire, in 1872.

Gibson was a Fellow of the Society of Antiquaries of London; his medical qualifications were M.R.C.S. Engl. 1846, L.S.A. 1855, and L.M. Edinb. (Univ. Edinb.). He died at Bebington on 12 June 1874.

== Works ==
Gibson wrote two books:

- The Old Man, or Ravings and Ramblings round Coniston (Kendal, 1849, several editions), first published in chapters in the Kendal Mercury, prompted by a suggestion of Christopher North on guides to the Lake District.
- The Folk-speech of Cumberland and some Districts adjacent, being Short Stories and Rhymes in the Dialect of the West Border Counties (Carlisle, 1869, 2nd ed. 1873), containing a ballad in the Annandale dialect, The Lockerbie Lycke, first published in Tait's Magazine.

As a young man Gibson contributed to newspapers. He wrote for the Transactions of the Historic Society of Lancashire and Cheshire and for other antiquarian associations. He was author of "The Geology of the Lake Country" in Harriet Martineau's Guide to the Lake District; and of articles in medical and other periodicals.

L’al Dinah Grayson was arranged by Jeffrey Mark, one of his four dialect settings published by OUP in 1928.

== Family ==
Gibson married in May 1844 Sarah, daughter of John Bowman of Hoadyood in Lamplugh.

== Notes ==
Attribution

This article incorporates text from a publication now in the public domain: Stephen, Leslie, ed. (1890). "Gibson, Alexander Craig". Dictionary of National Biography. Vol. 21. London: Smith, Elder & Co.
