= Kirkby-in-Furness railway station =

Railway station in Cumbria, England

Kirkby-in-Furness
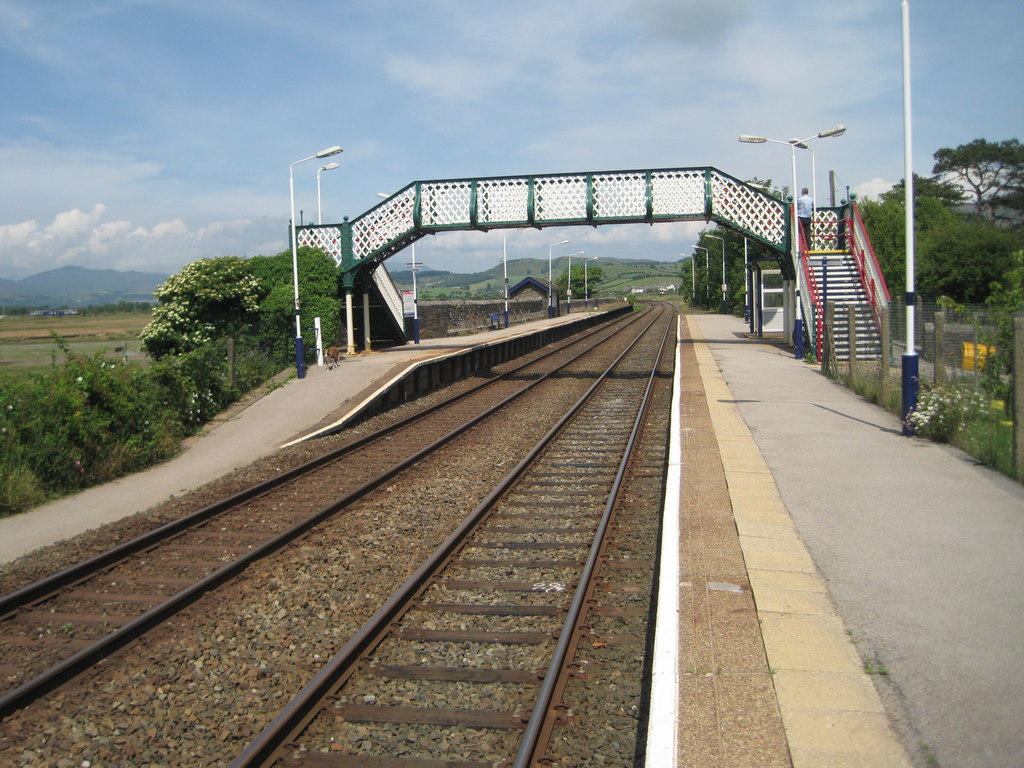

General information
- Location: Kirkby-in-Furness, Westmorland and Furness; England
- Coordinates: 54°13′58″N 3°11′14″W
- Grid reference: SD226825
- Owner: Network Rail
- Manager: Northern Trains
- Platforms: 2
- Tracks: 2

Other information
- Station code: KBF
- Classification: DfT category F2

History
- Original company: Furness Railway
- Pre-grouping: Furness Railway
- Post-grouping: London, Midland and Scottish Railway; British Rail (London Midland Region)

Key dates
- 24 August 1846: Opened as Kirkby
- 1927: Renamed Kirkby-in-Furness

Passengers
- 2021/22: ▲12,562
- 2022/23: ▲15,704
- 2023/24: ▲20,192
- 2024/25: ▲22,706
- 2025/26: ▼21,582
Location
- Location within the former South Lakeland district Location within Cumbria
Notes
- Passenger statistics from the Office of Rail and Road

Kirkby-in-Furness is a railway station on the Cumbrian Coast Line, which runs between Carlisle and Barrow-in-Furness. The station, situated 9 1/4 miles (15 km) north of Barrow-in-Furness, serves the village of Kirkby-in-Furness in Cumbria. It is owned by Network Rail and managed by Northern Trains.

The name Kirkby-in-Furness did not exist until the creation of the railway line. The village in fact is an amalgamation of six smaller villages and hamlets. The name was chosen almost at random by the train company for the station and was eventually used for the collection of villages.

In Victorian times, the station gained fame as the station with the longest platform seat in the country. However, this was removed many years ago.

== Facilities ==
There are no longer any permanent buildings at the station apart from a footbridge and shelters on each platform (that on the northbound one being the more substantial). The station has (like others on the line) been fitted with a ticket vending machine, to allow passengers to buy their tickets prior to travel. Step-free access is available to both platforms, though this requires the use of a barrow crossing for northbound passengers and so care must be taken when used. Train running information is provided by telephone, digital display screens and timetable posters.

== Services ==
There is a basic hourly service in each direction, north to Millom, Whitehaven and Carlisle, and south to Barrow-in-Furness. A few continue through to Lancaster. The last two evening northbound trains terminate at Millom.

A Sunday service (the first for more than forty years) was introduced at the May 2018 timetable change –this runs broadly hourly from mid-morning until the early evening (though some services only run to/from Millom).

Preceding station	National Rail	Following station
Foxfield	Northern Trains; Cumbrian Coast Line	Askam
	Historical railways	
Foxfield	Furness Railway	Askam
