= Torver railway station =

Disused railway station in Cumbria, England

Torver
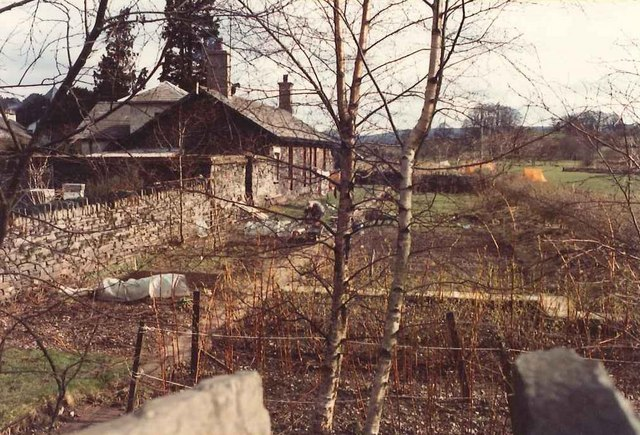
- Torver station in 1983

General information
- Location: Torver, Westmorland and Furness; England
- Coordinates: 54.3385°N 3.1020°W
- Grid reference: SD284941
- Platforms: 1

Other information
- Status: Disused

History
- Original company: Coniston Railway
- Pre-grouping: Furness Railway
- Post-grouping: London Midland and Scottish Railway

Key dates
- 18 June 1859: Station opened
- 6 October 1958: Station closed to passengers
- 3 April 1962: Station closed completely
Location
- Location within the former South Lakeland district Location within Cumbria

Torver railway station served the village of Torver, in Lancashire, England (now in Cumbria). It was on the branch line to Coniston.

== History ==
Authorised by Parliament in August 1857 the line to Coniston was opened by the Coniston Railway less than two years later on 18 June 1859. The station was used for the shipment of slate and stone from the local quarries as well as by passengers.

The station was host to a LMS camping coach from 1934 to 1939.

British Railways closed the station and the branch to passengers on 6 October 1958 and completely on 3 April 1962. The station building remains and has been converted into holiday accommodation.

Preceding station	Disused railways	Following station
Woodland; Line and station closed	Furness Railway; Coniston Railway	Coniston; Line and station closed

== Gallery ==
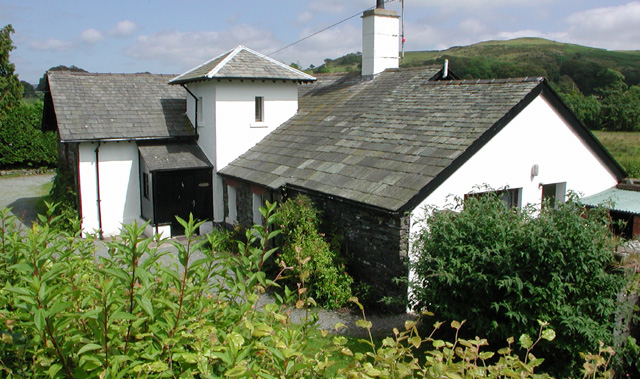
The station buildings in 2002
