= Jeffrey Mark =

English composer, folk song collector and writer

Jeffrey Mark (1898 – December 1965) was an English composer, folk song collector and writer.

== Life and career ==
Mark was born in Carlisle, Cumberland, the son of a cabinet maker, and in 1909 won a scholarship to the Carlisle Grammar School. At 16 he joined Martin's Bank in Carlisle. He enlisted in the war at the age of 17 as a gunnery officer, rising to the rank of first lieutenant in the Royal Field Artillery. But he was gassed in France and hospitalised for a year. The medical consequences and trauma affected him for the rest of his life.

After the war Mark took a degree in English and Music at Exeter University, then joined the Royal College of Music as a mature student under Stanford, Vaughan Williams and Holst. A fellow student there (seven years his junior) was Michael Tippett, and the two remained friends. In 1924 Mark moved to the US, where for three years he was head of the New York Public Library's Music Department. While there he worked on the manuscripts of Orlando Gibbons held by the library. During his time in New York, he also studied the self-transformation ideas of G.I. Gurdjieff, under the guidance of A.R. Orage. A nervous breakdown led him to return to England.

Throughout his life Mark performed, collected and arranged folksongs from Cumberland, Northumberland and the Border Counties. His Four North Country Songs, concert arrangements of dialect songs – including Sally Gray, L’al Dinah Grayson, Barley Broth and Auld Jobby Dixon – were first performed and broadcast in 1927, and published by OUP in 1928. They also acquired local popularity through performances by the Carlisle Music Society during the 1930s and 1940s. Mark was encouraged to make the arrangements by Newcastle composer and musicologist William Gillies Whittaker.

During the 1940s and 1950s he worked in London, writing for Picture Post magazine with his lifelong friend Tom Hopkinson. In 1960 Mark returned to the Royal College of Music to teach composition. There he revived his interest in dialect song settings through student performances. He died in London of cancer in December 1965, a victim of a lifetime's heavy smoking and the severe gassing he suffered in the trenches.

== Relationship with Tippett ==
Michael Tippett described him as "a Percy Grainger-ish person...very anti-classicist, feeling that the music we were all writing was fundamentally based on German folk-song and we should try to get away from that". Tippett identified the polyrhythms and Northumbrian elements in his own Concerto for Double String Orchestra as coming from the influence of Mark. The piece is dedicated to him, and Tippett also produced a portrait of Mark in the second variation of the Fantasia on a Theme of Handel: "for war traumatised Jeffrey Mark a jangling explosion of octaves".

Politically, Mark was very different from Tippett. He was drawn to the ideas of Ezra Pound (with whom he corresponded) and developed an anti-Marxist, anti-Semitic political theory involving bankers.

== Composer ==
His own works include orchestral strathspeys, a piano concerto, the North Country Suite for orchestra (performed at the RCM in 1927), the Scottish Suite for four violins and piano (published in 1927 as part of the Carnegie Collection of British Music), some choral music and the ballad opera Mossgiel, after Robert Burns. Mark based the final movement of his Scottish Suite on a close study of the Piobaireachd, which he described as "the old music of the Great Highland Bagpipe". The unpublished Dance Concerto for piano and orchestra was performed in his memory at the RCM following his death.

== Author ==
During the 1920s Mark wrote a series of substantial articles for publications including Music and Letters, Musical Quarterly and The Musical Times, such as 'Dryden and the Beginnings of Opera in England' and 'The Fundamental Qualities of Folk Music', as well as pieces on more general subjects like 'The Problem of Audiences' and 'The Critic and the Composer'.

He also wrote on economics, including two books: The Modern Idolatry (1934) and The Analysis of Usury (1935), in which he formulated a system of free money, arguing that savings should be penalised and rents abolished. The Times Literary Supplement characterised his theories as "unworldly", and later as "an attack on the accepted bases of civilisation". There are also two unpublished books on mental illness.
