= Askam railway station =

Railway station in Cumbria, England

Askam
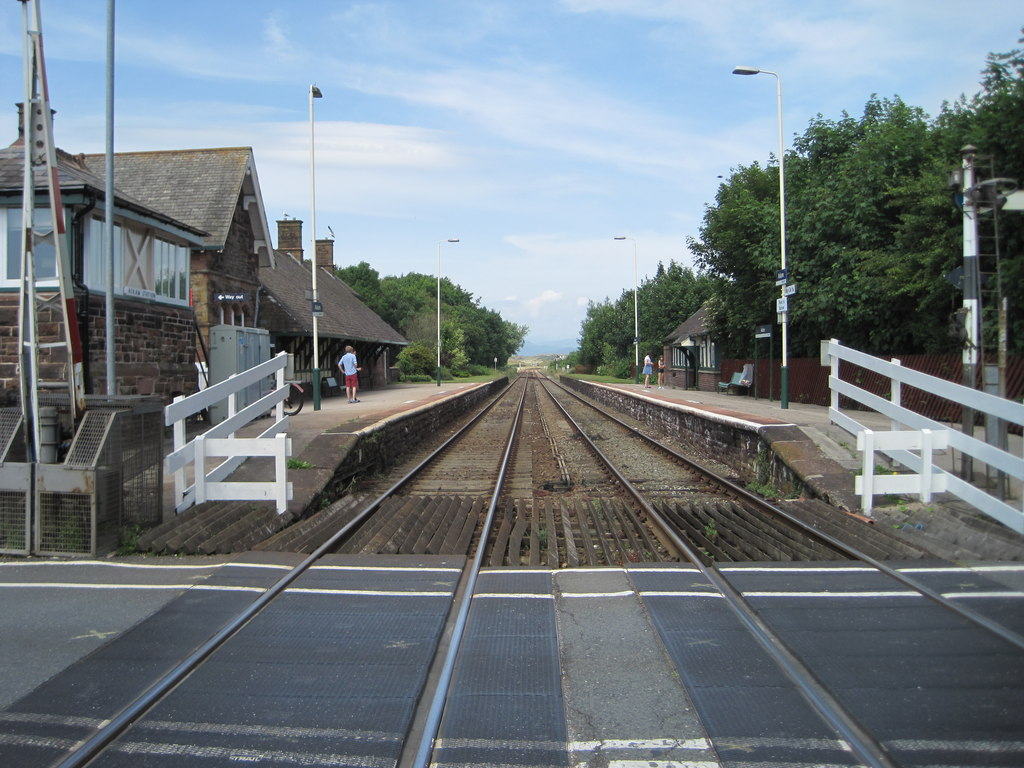

General information
- Location: Askam-in-Furness, Westmorland and Furness; England
- Coordinates: 54°11′21″N 3°12′16″W
- Grid reference: SD215777
- Owner: Network Rail
- Manager: Northern Trains
- Platforms: 2
- Tracks: 2

Other information
- Station code: ASK
- Classification: DfT category F2

History
- Original company: Furness Railway
- Pre-grouping: Furness Railway
- Post-grouping: London, Midland and Scottish Railway; British Rail (London Midland Region)

Key dates
- 1 March 1851: Opened as Ireleth Gate
- 1 April 1868: Renamed Ireleth
- 1 January 1875: Renamed Askam

Passengers
- 2021/22: ▲51,616
- 2022/23: ▲57,606
- 2023/24: ▲64,180
- 2024/25: ▲70,730
- 2025/26: ▼61,394
Location
- Location within the former Borough of Barrow-in-Furness Location within Cumbria
Notes
- Passenger statistics from the Office of Rail and Road

Askam is a railway station on the Cumbrian Coast Line, which runs between Carlisle and Barrow-in-Furness. The station, situated 6 miles (10 km) north of Barrow-in-Furness, serves the villages of Askam-in-Furness and Ireleth in Cumbria. It is owned by Network Rail and managed by Northern Trains.

== History ==
Originally, the station was built here to transport the iron ore being mined in Askam out of the village.

=== The line ===
The railway along the Cumbrian coast was completed over many years by numerous small firms, who often would refuse to work together. However, eventually 'Grouping' forced the companies to work together on the railway, instead of constantly competing. Further problems were encountered when the people building the railway ran out of money, and so the proposed Duddon Viaduct, from Askam to Millom, was abandoned. Instead, a different route, going by way of Foxfield, was planned. This saved £37,000.

The plans were drawn up in 1843, and shortly afterwards, sections of the Furness Railway were built. The original section through Askam, coming from Millwood Junction, and going on to Kirkby Slate Warf was part of the original railway line. This was officially opened on 3 June 1846 with the station name being Ireleth Gate. A passenger service then began operating on 24 August of that same year.

=== The station ===
Originally, there was a simple stop in Askam. This was abolished in 1857; the later growth of Askam meant that it soon deserved a full sized station. In 1876 the vicar of Askam complained at a shareholders' meeting of the passenger accommodation at Askam:

They had both an up and down platform, but they were simply wooden railings with gravel banks. They were useful platforms, as they were used not only for passengers, but for cattle. On one side of the line, there was some slight covered accommodation, but in bad weather this was so thronged with men smoking and spitting that it was not suitable for ladies. On the other side, there was no covered accommodation, whatever, but the Station Master, like all other officials connected with the railway, was very kind to the public, by allowing them the use of the only room he had for living and cooking in.

(The Furness Railway's managing director responded that there were various plans for the improvement of the station, but nothing could be done until a dispute over the provision of a bridge at the station was resolved.)

The station that was built was actually originally designed for Millom, by Paley and Austin. The chalet-style station was opened on 1 April 1868.

Along with the station, sliding sheds were built next to the station. These were to store a banking locomotive, to aid trains with more than 16 wagons with the difficult climb to Lindal summit.

As well as carrying ore, there were dozens of smaller lines to practically every mine, furnace and factory in the area. For example, the Askam brick works had a 2 ft gauge line to transport clay. This line was operational until 1968.

=== Operational ===
Opened by the Furness Railway, it became part of the London, Midland and Scottish Railway during the Grouping of 1923. The station then passed to the London Midland Region of British Railways on nationalisation in 1948.

When Sectorisation was introduced in the 1980s, the station was served by Regional Railways, until the Privatisation of British Railways.

== Facilities ==
The station is not staffed, but now has a ticket machine in place so intending travellers can buy tickets or a permit to travel before boarding the train. The main building is grade II listed, but is not in railway use. The platforms are linked by means of a barrier level crossing, controlled by a stone Furness Railway signal box on the northbound side. Train running announcements are provided by telephone, information screens and posters. Step-free access is only available to the southbound platform (as the opposite one is reached by a short flight of steps).

== Services ==
Askam is one of the few mandatory stops on this section of the line (along with Corkickle, St Bees, Sellafield, Seascale, Ravenglass, Millom and Foxfield) and as a result all trains call here. There is an approximately hourly service in each direction from the station on Monday to Saturdays – southwards to Barrow-in-Furness and northwards to Millom. Most northbound ones run through to and from Whitehaven and Carlisle though one runs only as far as Sellafield. A few southbound trains continue beyond Barrow to Lancaster or to Preston.

A Sunday service was introduced at the May 2018 timetable change – the first for more than forty years.

== Gallery ==
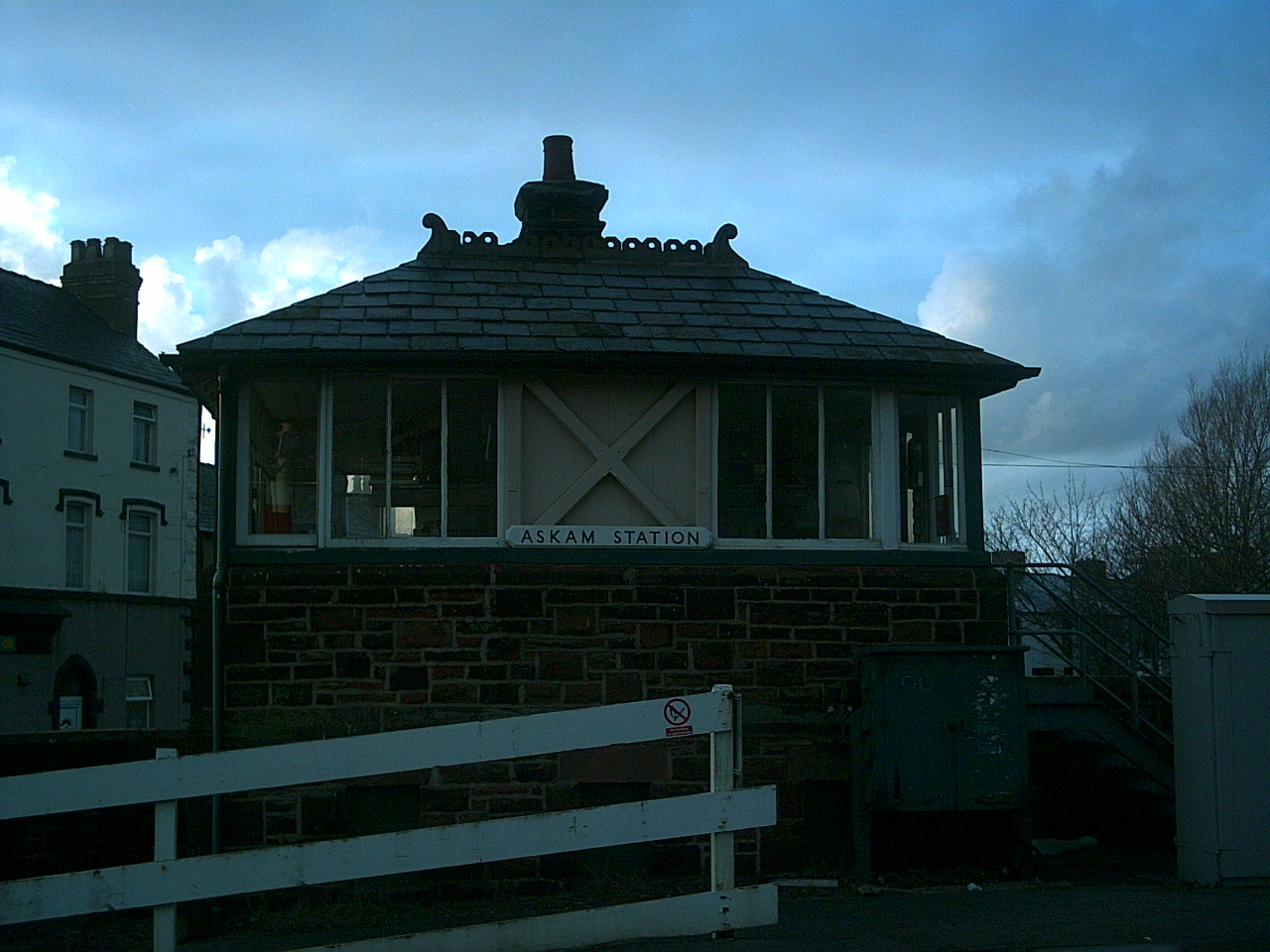
The station

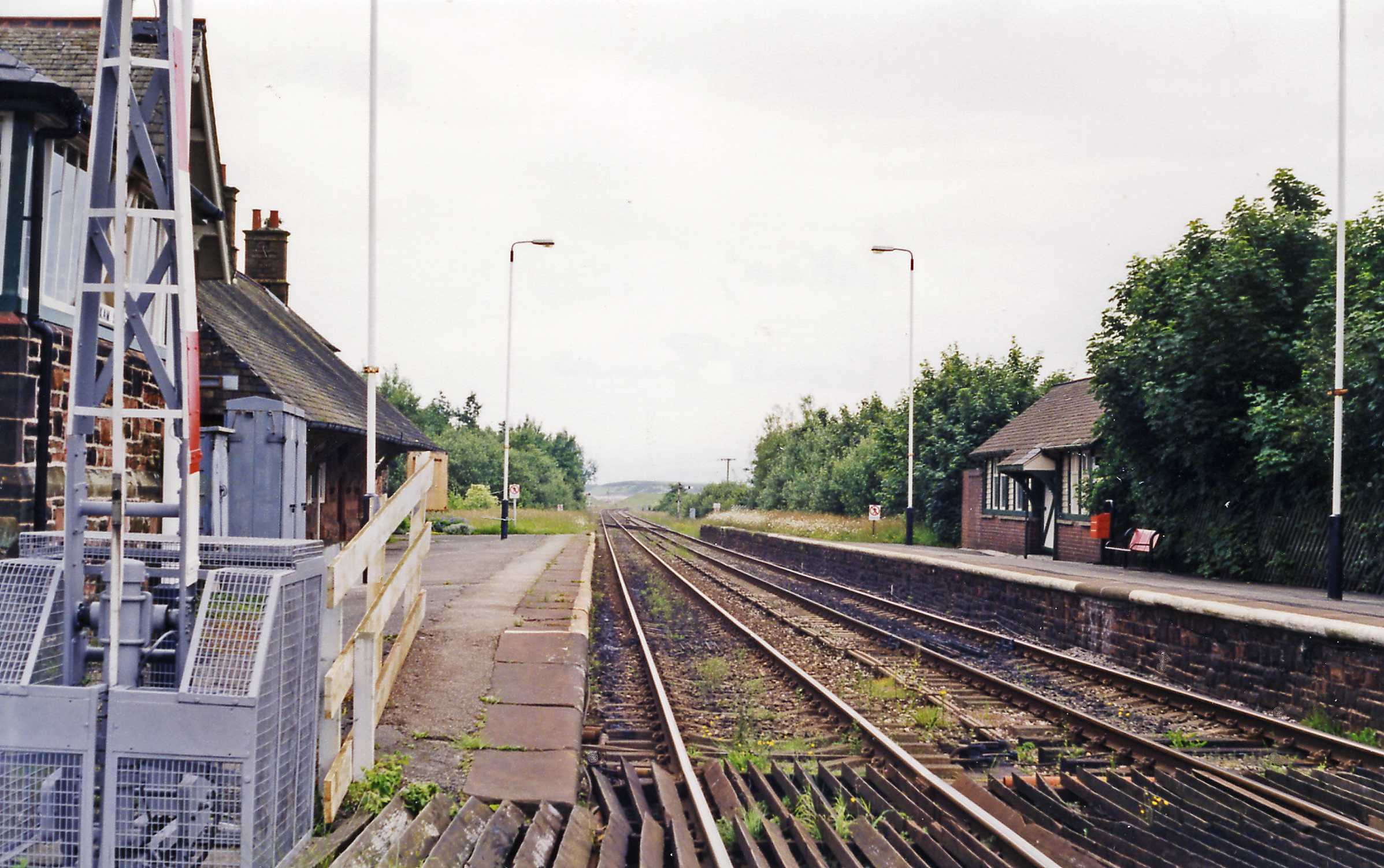
View northwards 1998

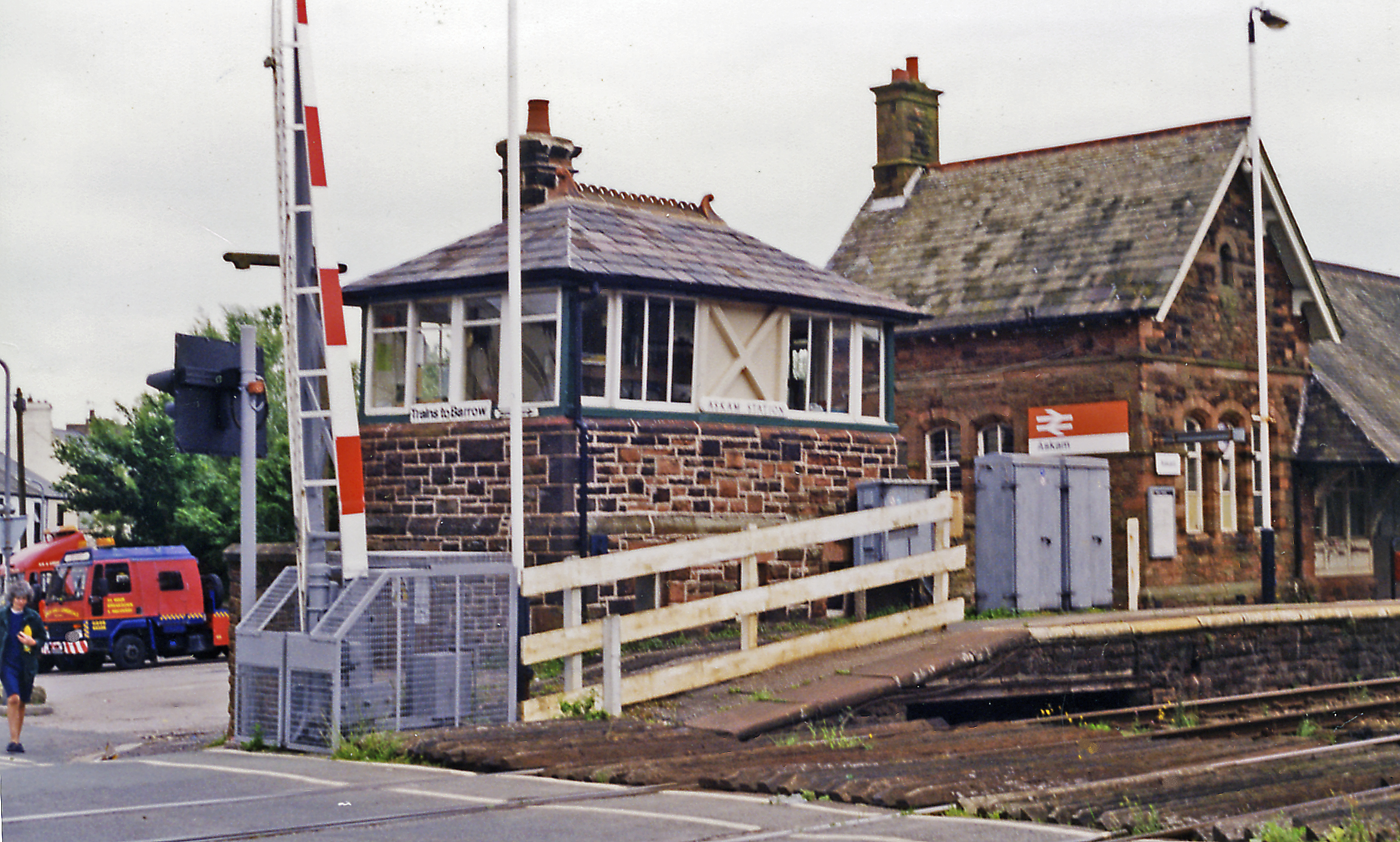
Signal box and crossing

== Sources ==
- Butt, R. V. J. (October 1995). The Directory of Railway Stations: details every public and private passenger station, halt, platform and stopping place, past and present (1st ed.). Sparkford: Patrick Stephens Ltd. ISBN 978-1-85260-508-7. OCLC 60251199. OL 11956311M.
- Jowett, Alan (2000). Jowett's Nationalised Railway Atlas (1st ed.). Penryn, Cornwall: Atlantic Transport Publishers. ISBN 978-0-906899-99-1. OCLC 228266687.

| Preceding station | National Rail | Following station |
|---|---|---|
| Kirkby-in-Furness | Northern Trains; Cumbrian Coast Line | Barrow-in-Furness |
| | Historical railways | |
| Kirkby-in-Furness | Furness Railway | Barrow-in-Furness |
