= Coniston copper mines =

Former copper mine in Westmoreland (Cumbria) England

Coordinates: 54°22′39″N 3°05′43″W

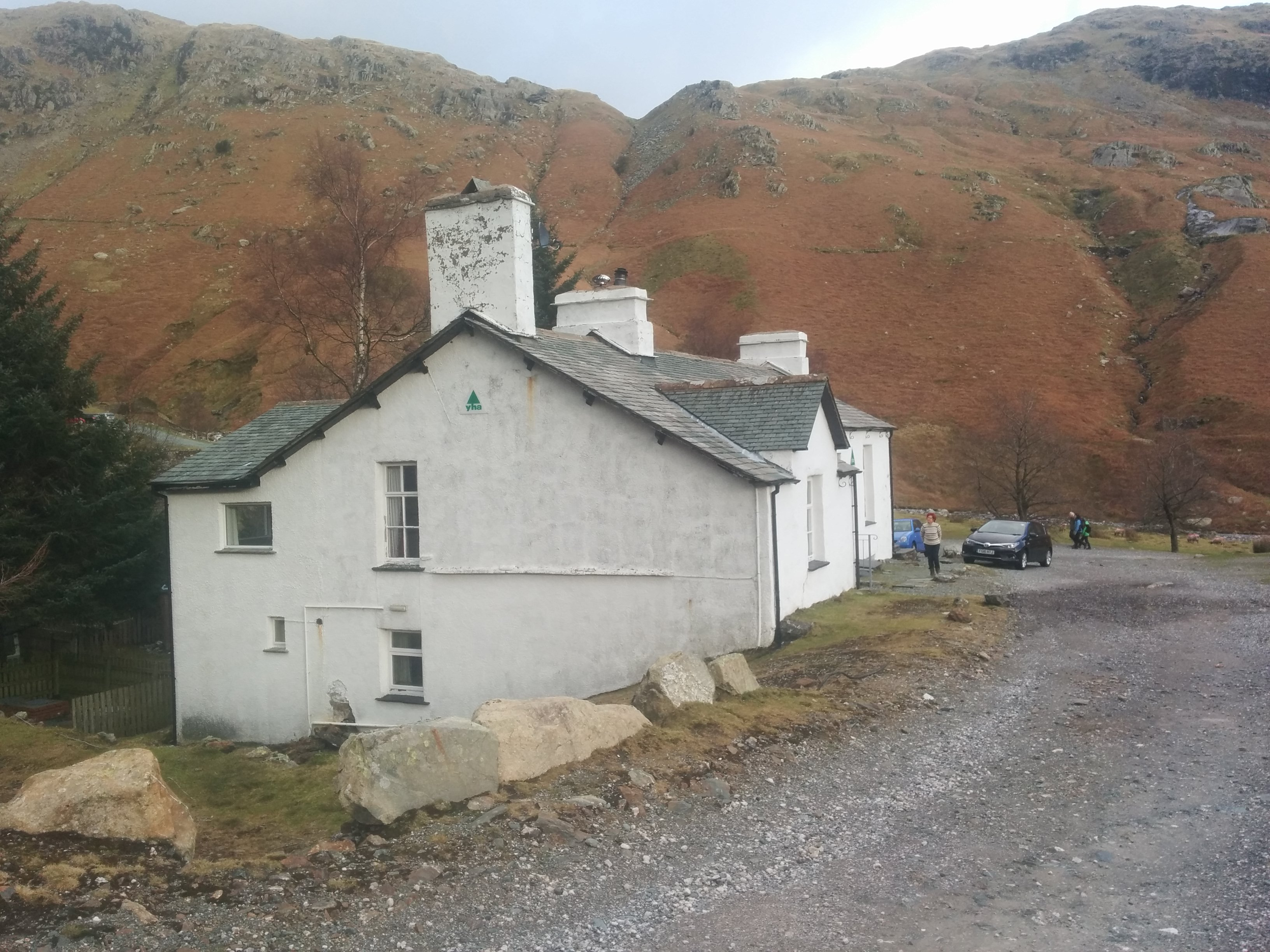
Coniston Coppermine Youth Hostel in 2016

The Coniston copper mines were a copper mining operation in Lancashire, England. It was functional for hundreds of years in Coppermines Valley above Coniston Water. Today there are industrial remains of the industry and the Coniston Coppermines Youth Hostel is based in the old manager's building.

Mining for copper in the valley dates back to the 16th century and the area continued to be mined until the 1950s. In 1982 the buildings in the valley were purchased by The Coppermines Lakes Cottages founder Philip Johnston who set about a comprehensive scheme of rebuilding, restoration and conservation. The buildings were sympathetically restored from the original Victorian sawmill. In 1974, the area of Coniston and the Furness Fells was transferred for administrative purposes to the area of Cumbria County Council.

== History ==
Industrial mining of copper at Coniston is said to have started when Elizabeth I brought over German miners to exploit the local deposits. During the English Civil War mining equipment was damaged, and as a result progress was slowed, and mining became dependent on fire cracking (not explosive) techniques. This mine was one of the first large scale mines to be dug.

In 1756, Charles Roe, a Derbyshire industrialist, started his early copper mining investments at Coniston. In the nineteenth century water power was used and the mines were then extensively developed by John Taylor. The mines reached depths of 270 feet (82 m).

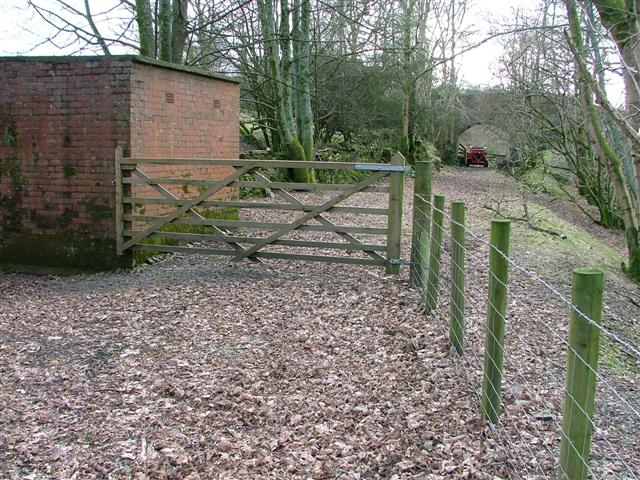
The (now abandoned) Coniston to Broughton railway line

In 1830, the "Manager's house" was built. The building was used by the clerk and the manager when he visited. The rooms inside housed storage, a bedroom, a kitchen and an office/boardroom. From 1849 to 1857 the mines employed Alexander Craig Gibson as their surgeon. Gibson was noted for his books on local folklore.

In 1859 the Coniston Railway was opened, which was put between Broughton and Coniston to transport the copper ore. The line was extended in 1860 to the Copper Mine Railway Station.

The 1870s saw the most successful period under the leadership of John Taylor and his manager John Barratt. The mines were part of Taylor's extensive portfolio of companies, and while running them, he revolutionized the way water powered ore crushers. Large black shafts were developed in the mines and a system was created to divert water around the workings.

Copper mining, which had fostered the growth of Coniston, stopped in 1914.

== Youth hostel ==
In 1928 the mine manager's building was first used as a hostel. In 1931 it became part of the Youth Hostel Association's network of hostels. It was their first hostel in the Lake District.

The hostel is in Coppermines Valley above the town of Coniston. In 2016 the National Lottery gave a large grant to develop the history of the copper mines in Coniston.
