= Coniston Railway =

Railway in Cumbria, England

The Coniston Railway was a railway in Cumbria, England, linking Coniston and Broughton-in-Furness, which ran for over 100 years between the middle of the 19th to the middle of the 20th century. It was originally designed for the transport of slate and copper ore from the mines near Coniston to the coast and later developed into a line for tourists to the Lake District. The line opened in 1859 and closed in 1962.

== Background ==
The Romans were mining copper ore in the Coniston area 2000 years ago, and there is evidence that copper was being extracted from the area as long ago as the Bronze Age. Green slate has also been quarried in the area for at least 500 years and there has been a tourist industry for some 200 years. By the middle of the 19th century the copper mines and the slate quarries at Coniston were flourishing, the mines employing 400 men and the quarries were producing an average of 2,000 tons of slate a month. Around this time the Coniston mines were the largest copper mines in the north of England.

Before the railway was built, materials had to be transported in horse-drawn carts to Coniston Water, by barge on the lake, and then again by cart to Broughton-in-Furness. The public had to travel on a horse-drawn omnibus. In 1848, hoping for an increase in tourism, J. G. Marshall demolished his inn at the head of the lake and replaced it with a "handsome hotel". The Furness Railway had opened their line from Barrow-in-Furness to Kirkby-in-Furness in June 1846 and its extension to Broughton in February 1848. The Whitehaven and Furness Junction Railway opened its line from Whitehaven in 1849 and this reached Broughton in October 1850. Also in 1849 the Furness Railway paid £550 (equivalent to £50,000 in 2025), to improve the road from Ambleside to Broughton (now the A593).

== Planning and building ==
In November 1849 the railway engineer John Barraclough Fell proposed building a railway with a gauge of 3 ft 3 in (990 mm) from the copper mines at Coniston to link with the Furness Railway at Broughton. John Robinson McClean, engineer of the Furness Railway, reported this to the Earl of Burlington (later to be Duke of Devonshire), the company's chairman, recommending that the line should be of standard gauge. However no further action was taken at that time. Interest in the line revived in 1856, and the route was surveyed by George Sanders to plans drawn up by McClean and his assistant, Frank Stileman.

Coniston Railway Act 1857
- Act of Parliament
- Parliament of the United Kingdom
- Long title: An Act for making a Railway from Broughton to Coniston in the County Palatine of Lancaster; and for other Purposes.
- Citation: 20 & 21 Vict. c. cx

Dates
- Royal assent: 10 August 1857
Other legislation
Repealed by	Furness and Coniston Railways Amalgamation Act 1862

Status: Repealed

Text of statute as originally enacted

Furness and Coniston Railways Amalgamation Act 1862
- Act of Parliament
- Parliament of the United Kingdom
- Long title: An Act to authorize the Amalgamation of the Coniston Railway Company with the Furness Railway Company, and for other Purposes.
- Citation: 25 & 26 Vict. c. cxxxiii

Dates
- Royal assent: 7 July 1862

Text of statute as originally enacted

The Coniston Railway Act 1857 (20 & 21 Vict. c. cx) received royal assent on 10 August. The line was initially run as a separate business, although it was closely associated with the Furness Railway, having the same chairman (the Duke of Devonshire) and general manager (James Ramsden). A company was established with a capital of £45,000 (equivalent to £4,400,000 in 2025). Tenders were invited and the contract for building the line was awarded to Child & Pickles. Work on building the line started in January 1858, but the contractors became bankrupt in August of that year. The Furness Railway took over responsibility for completing the line.

The line was inspected on 25 May 1859 and again on 14 June by Colonel Yolland, the inspecting officer from the Railway Department of the Board of Trade. He identified a number of improvements to be made before he could sanction the opening of the line. The line was opened on 18 June 1859 although the buildings at Coniston railway station were not completed until the end of the year. These buildings were designed by the Lancaster architect E. G. Paley in Swiss chalet style. The extension of the line to the copper mines did not open until 1860. In 1862 the Coniston Railway was amalgamated with the Furness Railway, the Furness and Coniston Railways Amalgamation Act 1862 (25 & 26 Vict. c. cxxxiii) being passed on 7 July.

== Route ==
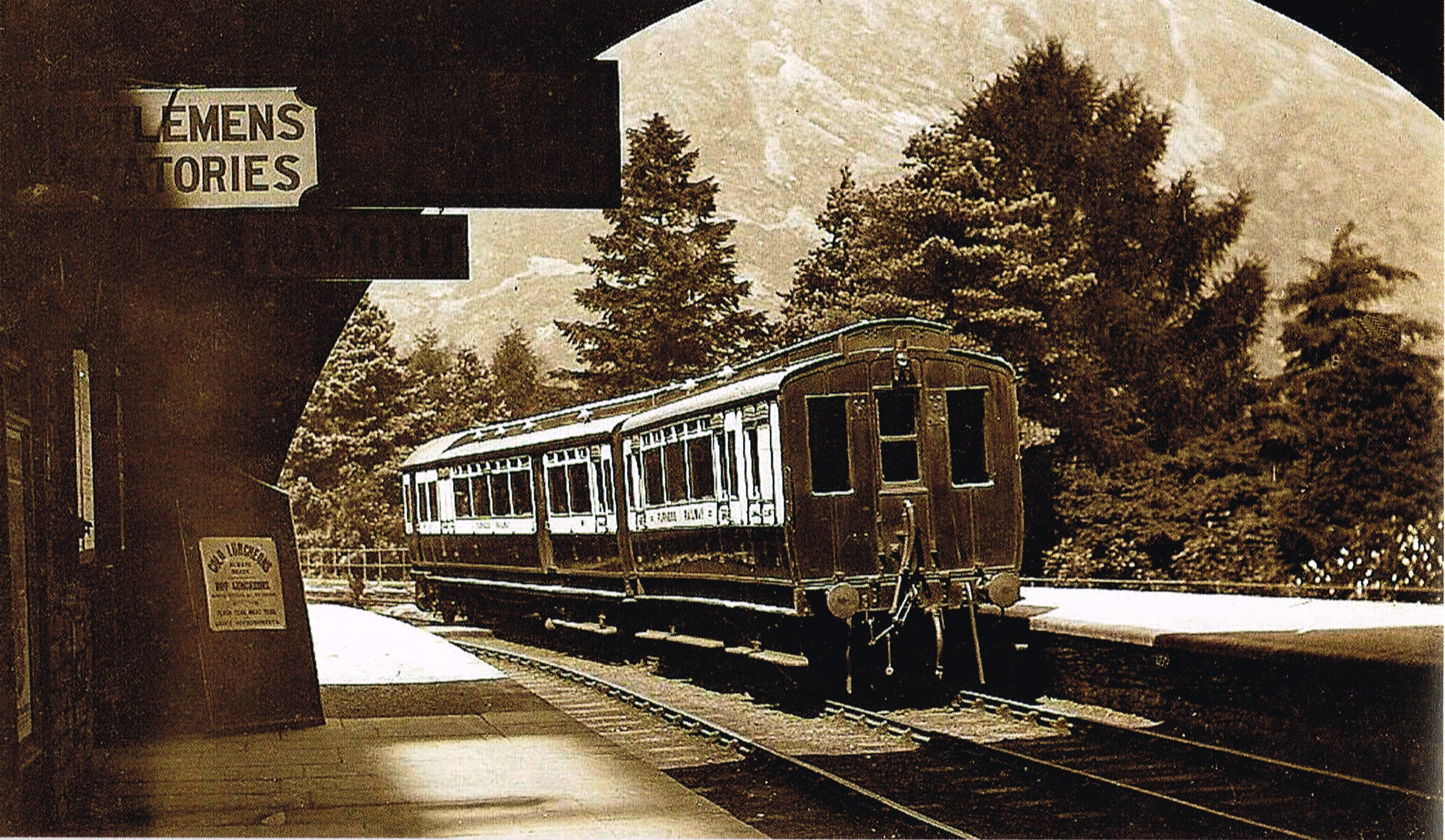
Railmotor and trailer at Coniston station in 1905

The line ran for 8.5 miles from Coniston to Broughton-in-Furness. At Broughton-in-Furness it joined the Whitehaven and Furness Junction Railway to Foxfield where lines led in one direction towards the west coast of Cumberland (as it then was) and in the other direction via the Furness Railway to Barrow-in-Furness. There were stations at Coniston and Broughton-in-Furness, with intermediate stations at Torver and Woodland. An extension from Coniston to Copper House (for the copper mines) was opened in 1860. From Broughton-in-Furness the line rose steeply, initially up a gradient of 1 in 49, to Woodland. From Woodland it continued to rise, with a maximum gradient of 1 in 77, to Torver. Just after Torver station it reached its highest level and then descended towards Coniston, with a level section just before Coniston station.

== Subsequent development ==
From the outset trains ran from Coniston to Broughton-in-Furness and on to Foxfield and most trains went further, terminating at Kirkby-in-Furness. On weekdays there were four trains each way every weekday and two on Sundays. During the winter months there were only three trains on weekdays. By 1907 there were eight trains each day between Foxfield and Coniston. The "Fleetwood Boat Train" had a connection with the steamer service between Fleetwood and Barrow. Towards the end of the First World War workmen's trains ran between Coniston and the shipyards at Barrow. In August 1930 there were ten trains running each way on weekdays. In the summer of 1939 a direct train was introduced from Blackpool Central to Coniston. After the Second World War there continued to be about nine trains a day on weekdays. On Tuesdays and Thursdays a through train travelled from Blackpool. Initially on Sundays there were usually two trains a day each way, although by 1922 there were four trains. After the Second World War there were usually only three trains each way on Sundays.

== Steam yachts ==
=== Gondola ===
From the outset of the railway the company were aware of its potential for tourism. In an attempt to attract more tourists to use the line it bought a steam yacht, the Gondola. This was made by the Liverpool firm of Jones, Quiggin and Company at a cost of £1,200 (£130,000 in 2025), transported in sections by rail, and assembled on the slipway close to Coniston Hall. It was launched on 30 November 1859 and began to run a regular service the following June. Gondola was 84 feet (26 m) long and was registered to carry 200 passengers. In 1900 alterations were made at a cost of £35 (£3,700 in 2025), removing the smoking room and providing more accommodation for second-class passengers. The boat was taken out of service in 1936. Its engine was removed and sold in 1944, the boat itself was used as a houseboat, and then sunk in the winter of 1963–64. It was later re-floated and acquired by the National Trust in 1978. It was divided into sections and taken to Vicker's shipyard at Barrow-in-Furness for rebuilding. Gondola was reassembled at Coniston and resumed service in 1980.

=== Lady of the Lake ===
Such was the success of Gondola that the company commissioned another boat, the Lady of the Lake. This was manufactured by Thorneycroft of Southampton in 1907 and was registered to carry 400 passengers. It cost £5,600 (£580,000 in 2025), was 97 feet 6 inches (29.72 m) long and had a maximum speed of 11.5 knots. The boat was taken out of service at the outset of the Second World War and broken up for scrap in 1950.

== Locomotives ==
From the start, locomotives were supplied by the Furness Railway. Originally these were of two types, 0-4-0 locomotives built by Bury, Curtis, and Kennedy, of which Copperknob is an example, and 2-2-2 well tanks built by Sharp Brothers and Company. In the 1870s and 1880s the passenger trains were hauled by 2-4-0 locomotives built by Sharp, Stewart and Company, which were later replaced by 4-4-0 locomotives, which were later converted into 2-4-2T locomotives. For the purpose of economy, the railway developed a "steam rail motor car" which ran between 1905 and 1915. Meanwhile, the 2-4-2T locomotives were being helped out by 0-6-2T locomotives. In 1915 a 4-4-2T locomotive designed by Pettigrew was introduced.

From 1934 motor trains were introduced, powered by L&YR Class 5 2-4-2T locomotives designed by Aspinall. From 1935 Fowler 2-6-2T locomotives were used on the line. During the Second World War the Aspinall tanks were replaced by Webb 2-4-2T tanks. The final locomotives regularly used on the line were Ivatt 2-6-2T locomotives. Trains on the Blackpool to Coniston service were usually hauled by a Stanier Class 5 locomotive, although on one occasion in July 1957, it was hauled by Jubilee 45678 De Robeck. In August 1954 an experimental three-car diesel train was introduced but this was unsuccessful.

== Closure and today ==
In 1957 there were eight trains each day and a survey showed that an average of only 18 passengers were carried on each of these trips. It was estimated that if the line were closed about £17,000 (£360,000 in 2025), would be saved each year. The line was closed for passenger trains on 6 October 1958. On 27 August 1961 an enthusiast's train ran on the line pulled by Fowler 4F 44347. Freight services ended on 30 April 1962 and the track was lifted and the other railway structures were removed. The Coniston footbridge was dismantled and re-built at Ravenglass for the Ravenglass and Eskdale Railway. Most of the land was sold to farmers along the route. Part of the track bed was used for a new water main constructed in 1974. Other parts of the track bed were converted into footpaths. Most of the bridges were demolished. The station buildings at Torver, Woodland and Broughton, and two of the crossing cottages, were sold to be used as private houses. Coniston station was demolished in 1968 and its site used for industrial units and houses. Gondola continues to run a service during summer months, calling at Coniston Pier, Brantwood and Monk Coniston.
