= Marton, Cumbria =

Village in Cumbria, England

Coordinates: 54.18769°N 3.158499°W

Marton
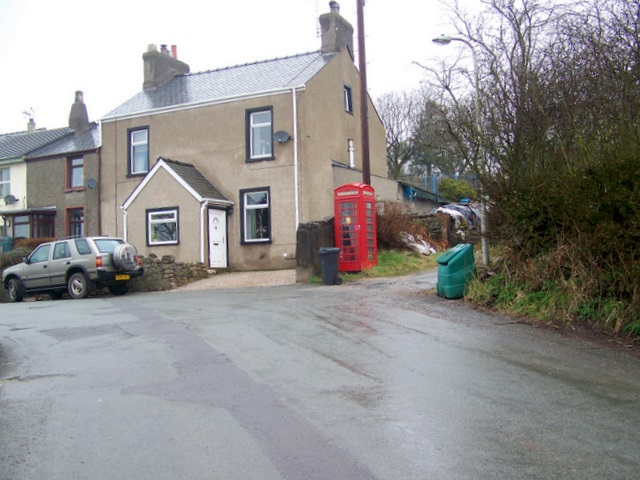
- Marton

- Location in Barrow-in-Furness Borough Location within Cumbria
- OS grid reference: SD2477
- Civil parish: Lindal and Marton
- Unitary authority: Westmorland and Furness
- Ceremonial county: Cumbria
- Region: North West
- Country: England
- Sovereign state: United Kingdom
- Post town: ULVERSTON
- Postcode district: LA12
- Dialling code: 01229
- Police: Cumbria
- Fire: Cumbria
- Ambulance: North West
- UK Parliament: Barrow and Furness

Marton is a village on the Furness peninsula in the county of Cumbria, England. It shares a church, a parish council and primary school with the nearby Lindal-in-Furness.
