= Millom railway station =

Railway station in Cumbria, England

Millom
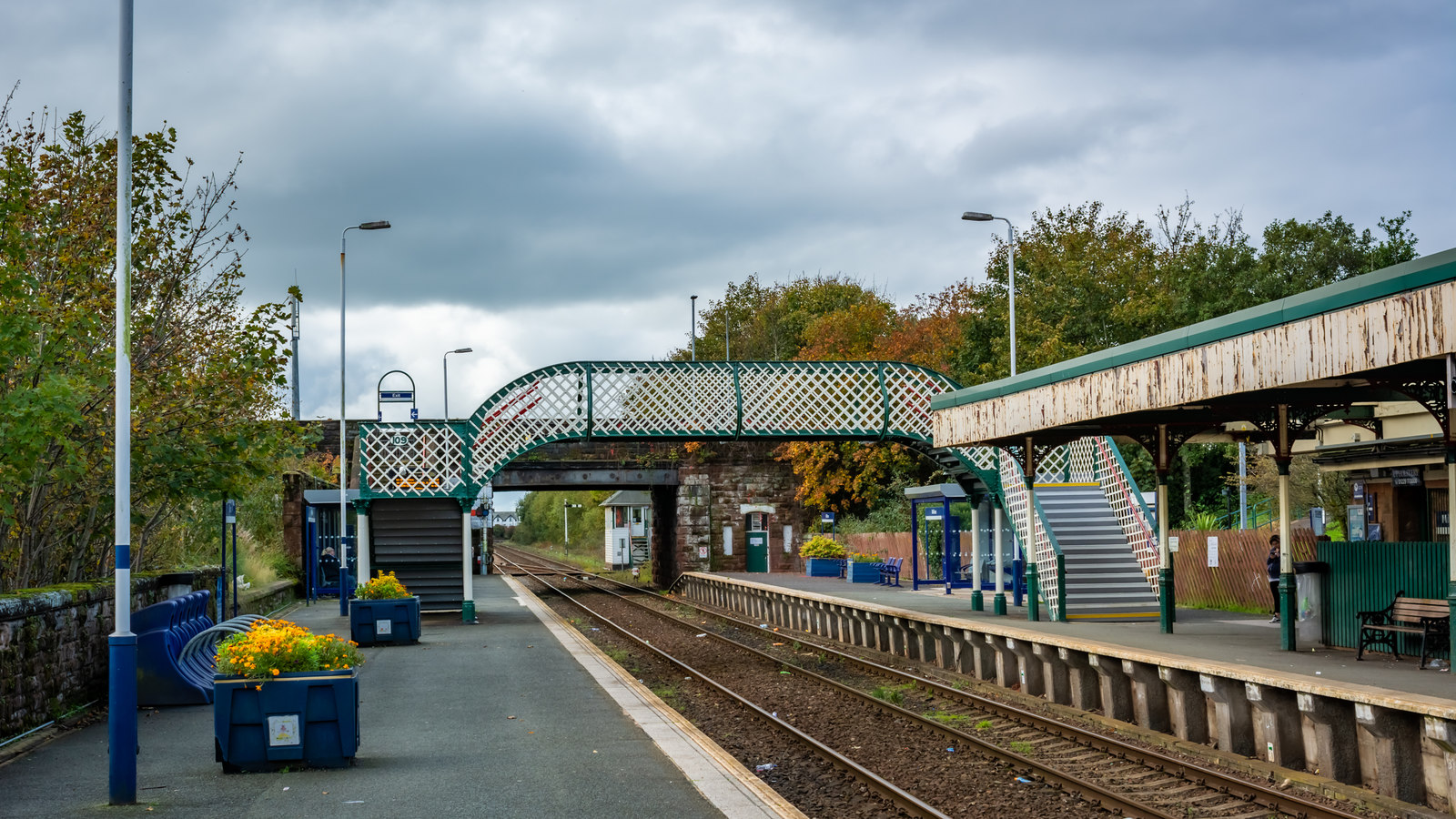

General information
- Location: Millom, Cumberland; England
- Coordinates: 54°12′40″N 3°16′14″W
- Grid reference: SD171801
- Owner: Network Rail
- Manager: Northern Trains
- Platforms: 2
- Tracks: 2

Other information
- Station code: MLM
- Classification: DfT category F1

History
- Original company: Whitehaven and Furness Junction Railway
- Pre-grouping: Furness Railway
- Post-grouping: London, Midland and Scottish Railway; British Rail (London Midland Region)

Key dates
- 1 November 1850: Opened as Holborn Hill
- 1 August 1866: Renamed Millom for Holborn Hill
- 1893/1894: Renamed Millom

Passengers
- 2020/21: ▼78,216
- 2021/22: ▲0.164 million
- 2022/23: ▲0.168 million
- 2023/24: ▲0.174 million
- 2024/25: ▲0.187 million
Location
- Location within the former Borough of Copeland Location within Cumbria
Notes
- Passenger statistics from the Office of Rail and Road

Millom is a railway station on the Cumbrian Coast Line, which runs between Carlisle and Barrow-in-Furness. The station, situated 16 miles (26 km) north-west of Barrow-in-Furness, serves the town of Millom in Cumbria. It is owned by Network Rail and managed by Northern Trains.

== History ==
It was originally opened by the Whitehaven and Furness Junction Railway on 1 November 1850 as Holborn Hill. The station's name was changed to Millom for Holborn Hill on 1 August 1866, and Millom during the 1890s.

Until 1968, there was a short goods-only branch from here to the ironworks at Hodbarrow. This was abandoned after the works closed but the disused trackbed can still be seen from passing trains, whilst the old works site is now a nature reserve.

== Facilities ==
The booking office operates on a part-time basis; outside these times tickets can be purchased from a ticket machine on the southern side. Information screens and posters provide train running details for passengers. Both platforms have separate step-free access and are linked via a footbridge.

The station buildings also house Millom Heritage Museum And Visitor Centre (which runs the rail ticket office), which operates independently of Northern Trains.

== Services ==
Monday to Saturdays, there is generally an hourly service southbound to Barrow-in-Furness and northbound to Carlisle (one terminates at Sellafield) - however there is no service northbound after 21:00, with the last few trains from Barrow terminating here. Some services extend from Barrow along the Furness Line to Lancaster and Preston.

Northern introduced a Sunday service from the station (for the first time since 1976) from the summer 2018 timetable change. This runs broadly hourly from mid-morning until early evening.

Preceding station	National Rail	Following station
Silecroft	Northern Trains; Cumbrian Coast Line	Green Road
	Historical railways	
Silecroft	Whitehaven and Furness Junction Railway	Green Road

== Bibliography ==
- Marshall, Geoff; Pipe, Vicki (2018). The Railway Adventures: Places, Trains, People and Stations. September Publishing. ISBN 978-1910463871.
