= Coniston railway station (England) =

Former station in Cumbria

Coniston
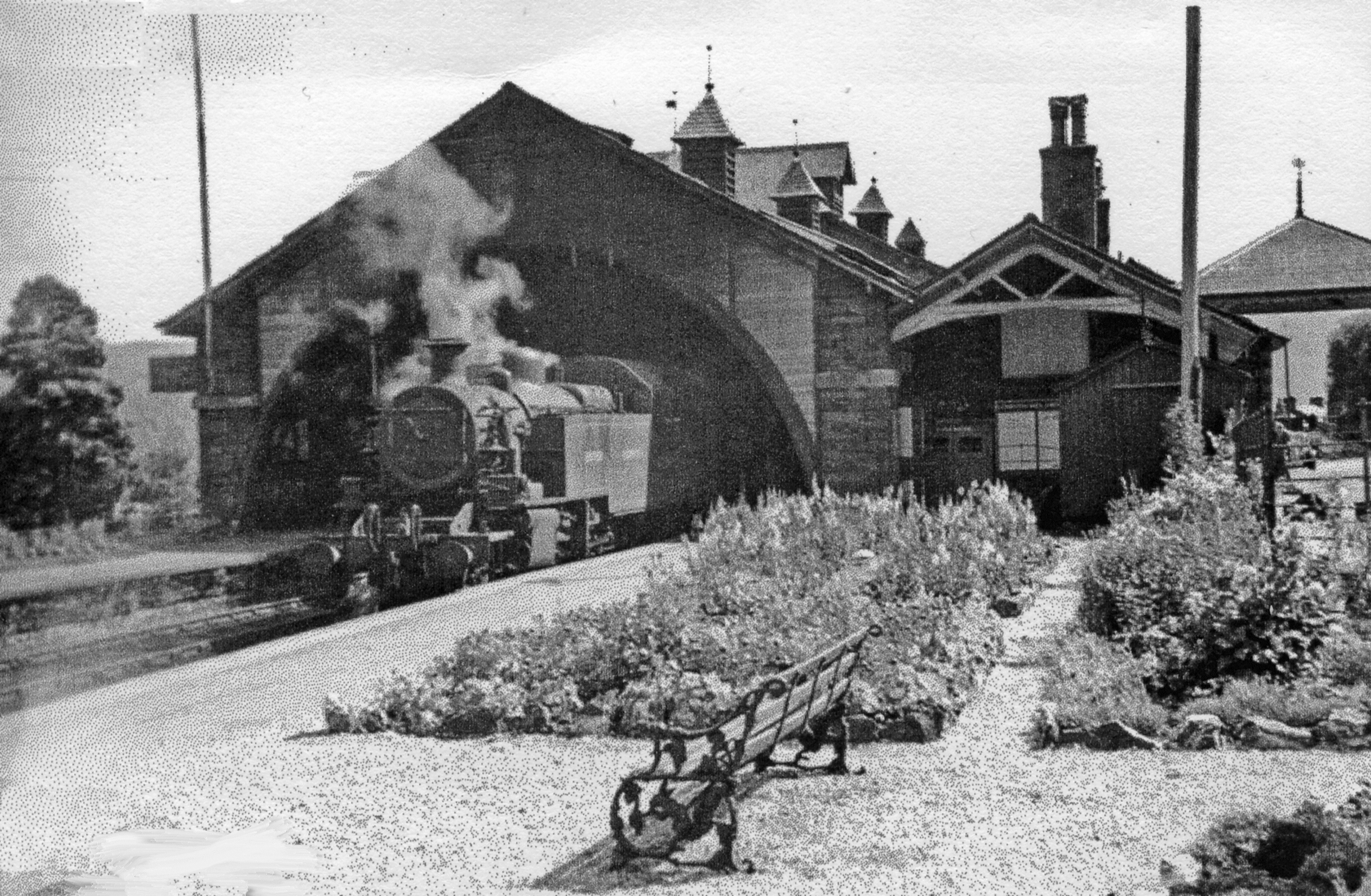
- Coniston station in 1951

General information
- Location: Coniston, Westmorland and Furness; England
- Coordinates: 54.3680°N 3.0801°W
- Grid reference: SD300974
- Platforms: 3

Other information
- Status: Disused

History
- Original company: Coniston Railway
- Pre-grouping: Furness Railway
- Post-grouping: London Midland and Scottish Railway

Key dates
- 18 June 1859: Station opened as "Coniston Lake"
- by 1882: renamed "Coniston"
- 6 October 1958: Closed to passengers
- 30 April 1962: Closed completely
Location
- Location within the former South Lakeland district Location within Cumbria

Coniston railway station was the northern terminus of the Coniston branch line in the village of Coniston, Lancashire, England (now in Cumbria).

== History ==
Authorised by Parliament in August 1857 the line to Coniston was open less than two years later in June 1859. The station building was designed by the Lancaster architect E. G. Paley in Swiss chalet style. The station was enlarged between 1888 and 1892 at a cost of over £4,000 (equivalent to £440,000 in 2025). The train shed was doubled in length and the goods shed was enlarged. A third platform was added in 1896 at a cost of £750 (equivalent to £90,000 in 2025).

There was a single track engine shed and a 42 feet (13 m) turntable south east of the station building. The shed was re-roofed by British Railways then closed when the station closed to passengers in 1958, but remained standing until the line and station were demolished in the 1960s.

British Railways closed the station and the branch to passengers in 1958 and completely in 1962.

The line's last fare-paying passengers are believed to be participants of the SLS/MLS Furness railtour of 27 August 1961.

== Services ==
Railways in the area underwent a complex evolution with the development of Barrow-in-Furness in the second half of the nineteenth century. When Coniston Lake (as Coniston station was originally called) opened in 1858 Barrow was at its early stages of emergence as an industrial town, with Ulverston (then commonly written as "Ulverstone") remaining the local market town, as it had since the Middle Ages.

The May 1865 Down (towards Coniston Lake) timetable shows three arrivals at Coniston Lake - morning midday and evening - from Monday to Saturday (the days are implied, not stated) with two on Sundays; all these trains travelled direct from Ulverstone, with connections shuttling between Barrow and Ulverstone along what was described as "The Barrow Branch." By 1867 the pattern of provision had evolved so that most services shuttled along the branch to the Carnforth to Whitehaven main line at Foxfield, mostly making connections.

The Barrow loop line opened in 1882, making travel easier between what by then was called plain "Coniston" and the growing centre of employment at Barrow, though the core pattern remained whereby branch trains connected at Foxfield. Physical, social and railway geography nevertheless made a poor mix. Ulverston market day was and remains on Thursdays. Ulverston is approximately twelve miles from Coniston by road, but over twenty-seven miles by train via Barrow. Someone travelling on the market day extra from Coniston took 96 minutes to get to Ulverston, if all went well. This was an improvement in 1882, but a millstone when road travel improved in the following century.

In Summer 1907 eight trains left Coniston for Foxfield Monday to Saturday, with three on Sundays. The Winter service was weaker - in 1910 five trains left Coniston (still listed as "Coniston Lake" in Bradshaw) for Foxfield, with two on Sundays. By the summer of 1922 nine trains left Coniston (no longer Coniston Lake, even in Bradshaw) daily, with four on Sundays. This weekday pattern continued until closure, though Sunday services were more variable, especially during the Second World War. Steam railcars were used for many years, but from 1950 if not earlier the core motive power was a push-pull set powered by a late-LMS 2-6-2T designed by Henry George Ivatt as in the photograph above.

Great effort and money was expended on tourist services to Lakeside, but Coniston received much less attention in railway days and remains a relative backwater today. Few Special Trains travelled the branch and few Summer only trains reached Coniston from far away places. The exception which proved the rule was the Summer Tuesdays and Thursdays only service from Blackpool which survived until 1958, the line's last summer. In the 1930s the train also had a Summer Saturdays only variant which started at Carnforth and returned to Morecambe Promenade. This service was the only timetabled passenger train in BR days to travel direct between Dalton Junction and Park South, avoiding the long loop through Barrow.

Two initiatives were introduced to encourage people to use the line, as opposed to special trains - Camping coaches and lake steamers. From 1934 a camping coach was placed at Torver and three were positioned a short distance north of Coniston station on a siding off the branch to the Copperhouse. Campers were required to buy four adult returns from their home station. The Torver coach was not replaced after the Second World War, but those at Coniston were, 2 coaches were here in 1954 and three from 1955 until the end of the 1957 season. The steamer service was aimed at a socially select ridership, as underlined by its prices and literature. It was marketed as part of a suite of circular tours taking in trains, lake steamers, charabancs and sea-going paddle steamers across Morecambe Bay, suggestive of Grand Tours. The paddle steamer part of the tours was not revived after the First World War and Ribble buses replaced charabancs, but otherwise the core provision resumed after 1918 and continued until the outbreak of the Second World War, never to resume. Whilst this enterprise involved little investment in the railway it involved considerable investment by the Coniston and Furness Railways in the form of two steam vessels to ply the length of Coniston Water. The first was the steam yacht Gondola, launched in 1859, joined by Lady of the Lake in 1908. Lady of the Lake was scrapped in 1950 but Gondola has had a remarkable revival. She was still plying the lake in 2016.

One aim in building the line was to carry copper ore from the mines above Coniston; £20,000 of the £45,000 risk capital raised by the technically independent Coniston Railway came from the copper mine owners and lessees. In the event the mine had passed its zenith when the line opened. What few records survive show that the copper tonnage carried was much less than the slate tonnage and both were on an altogether smaller scale than iron ore traffic in the area outside the line. The line's 1877 working timetable shows just one daily goods train and no mineral trains, though goods traffic was supplemented before the First World War by the routine running of mixed trains. One goods train per day became three per week in LMS days, remaining so until the line closed to all traffic in 1962.

== Demolition and afterlife ==
The branch was lifted between April and November 1963, with most reusable materials being salvaged. Coniston station's footbridge was donated to the Ravenglass and Eskdale Railway but the building was abandoned and left to decay until December 1968 when it was demolished by North Lonsdale Rural District Council's Roads Department. The site was later used for light industry and housing.

Preceding station	Disused railways	Following station
Torver; Line and station closed	Furness Railway; Coniston Railway	Terminus

== See also ==
- List of non-ecclesiastical works by E. G. Paley
