= Harrington Church Road Halt railway station =

Disused railway station in Cumbria, England

Harrington

General information
- Location: Harrington, Cumberland; England
- Coordinates: 54.6154°N 3.5573°W
- Grid reference: NX995255
- Platforms: 1

Other information
- Status: Disused

History
- Original company: Cleator and Workington Junction Railway
- Post-grouping: London, Midland and Scottish Railway

Key dates
- November 1913: Opened
- 31 May 1926: Advertised passenger service ended
- 1 April 1929: Workmen's service ended, halt closed
Location

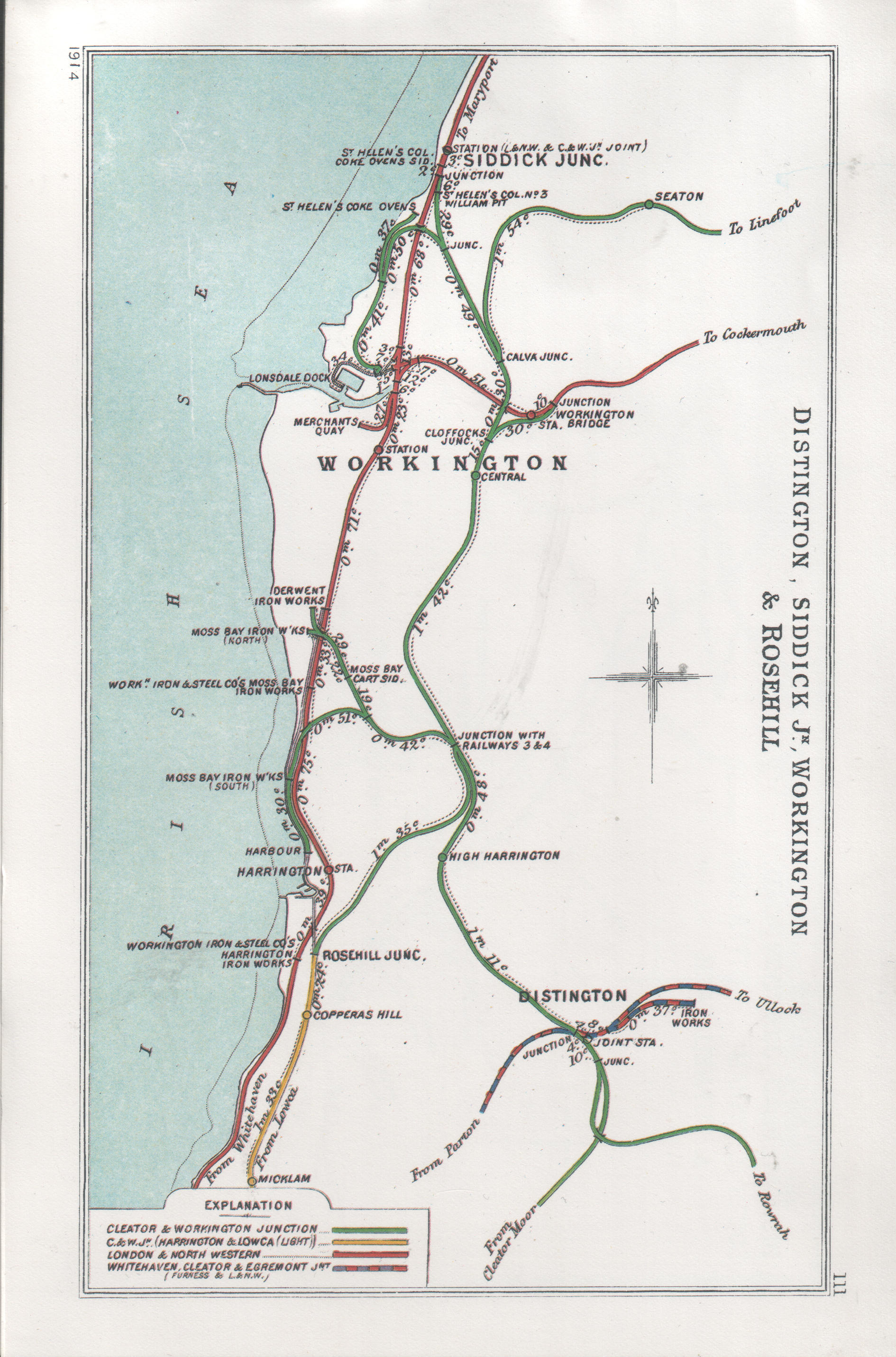
A 1914 Railway Clearing House Junction Diagram showing the complex network which existed in the Workington area

Harrington railway station, or Church Road halt, was a railway station in Harrington, Cumbria, England. It was opened by the Cleator and Workington Junction Railway (C&WJR) on the company's Harrington Branch which connected with the Lowca Light Railway at Rosehill to provide a through route from Lowca to Workington Central and beyond.

Official, authoritative and regional sources variously refer to the halt as Harrington (Church Road Halt), Harrington Church Road, Church Road Halt and simply Church Road.

Sources agree when the halt closed, but differ on when it opened. One authoritative source gives the opening as November 1913, whilst a key source with local knowledge gives both 1918 and November 1913 as the date the halt first appeared on the timetable. A later writer says the halt was in use by September 1913.

== Gradients ==
The route, and especially the Lowca Light Railway, was very steeply graded. There was a stretch southwards up Copperas Hill at 1 in 17 – the steepest adhesion-worked gradient in Britain over which regular passenger trains ran.

== History ==
The two companies had co-operated to provide unadvertised workmen's services along the route from 15 April 1912. From 2 June 1913 at least some of these trains - known locally as "The Rattler" - became publicly advertised with at least one 3rd Class coach for 'ordinary' passengers. Most trains plied between Lowca and Workington Central, though two continued to Seaton (Cumbria), the first stop up the C&WJR's "Northern extension". The Seaton trains were cut back to Workington from February 1922.

== Trains ==
Passenger trains consisted of antiquated Furness stock hauled largely by elderly Furness engines referred to as "rolling ruins" by one author after a footplate ride in 1949. Freight trains on the Lowca Light Railway through Harrington Junction to the Moss Bay and Derwent branches were usually hauled by industrial locomotives.

== Services ==
The line's primary objective was transporting minerals and the products and byproducts of coking plants. Photographs of trains in later years typically consist of a mix of mineral wagons and tar tanker wagons. The prime purpose of the passenger service was to enable workers to get from Workington to Lowca Colliery (also known as Harrington No. 10 Pit) which was situated on a remote cliff top overlooking the Irish Sea. Workers from Whitehaven were able to use workmen's trains which shuttled between Whitehaven and Parton Halt at the western end of the Gilgarran Branch near Parton.

The July 1922 public timetable shows three 3rd Class Only Up trains from Lowca, Monday to Friday, calling at Micklam, Rosehill (Archer Street Halt), Harrington (Church Road Halt) and Workington Central, with an extra on Saturdays. All were balanced by Down workings. There never was a public Sunday service on the route. Note that Copperas Hill is not shown, though a standard work gives its closing date as 1926. It was shown in the 1920 Working Time Table and last appeared in public timetables in 1921.

In 1923 the LMS replaced conventional trains with "Bus Trains" staffed by a travelling ticket inspector. This allowed stations to be de-staffed, but the service still could not compete with emerging road transport. The publicly advertised service ended on 31 May 1926. Unadvertised workmen's trains continued until 1 April 1929, after which the accoutrements of a passenger railway, such as extensive and costly signalling, were removed, enabling the line to return to its industrial origins.

The route continued in freight use from Lowca through the site of the halt to Moss Bay until 1973 when Solway Colliery, Workington closed, depriving the line of purpose. By then it had outlived the C&WJR's main line by nine years.

The tracks were lifted in 1973.

== Special trains ==
Two brakevan special trains aimed at railway enthusiasts travelled through the site of the halt in its later years. "The Furnessman" ran on 24 May 1969, with a Border Railway Society farewell tour on 26 May 1973 being the last train for ever.

== Afterlife ==
By 2013 the trackbed through the halt was readily visible on satellite imagery.

Preceding station	Disused railways	Following station
Workington Central; Line and station closed	Cleator and Workington Junction Railway	Rosehill (Archer Street Halt); Line and station closed

== See also ==
- Maryport and Carlisle Railway
- Furness Railway
- Whitehaven, Cleator and Egremont Railway
- Cockermouth and Workington Railway
