= Rose Hill Platform railway station =

Disused railway station in Cumbria, England

Rose Hill Platform

General information
- Location: Rose Hill, Harrington, Cumberland; England
- Coordinates: 54.6085°N 3.5663°W
- Grid reference: NX989248
- Platforms: Unknown

Other information
- Status: Disused

History
- Original company: Lowca Light Railway
- Post-grouping: Lowca Light Railway

Key dates
- 15 April 1912: Workmen's service commenced
- 2 June 1913: public service opened
- May 1926: public service withdrawn
- 1 April 1929: Workmen's service ended
Location

Rose Hill Platform served workmen in the Rose Hill area of Harrington in the former county of Cumberland, England, which is now part of Cumbria.

The halt was on the Harrington and Lowca Light Railway where it connected with the Cleator & Workington Junction Railway (CWJR) a short distance north of Copperas Hill and south of Harrington Village. Workmen's services to and from Lowca variously ran from Moss Bay Cart Siding, Maryport (during the First World War), Workington Central and Seaton (Cumbria). Public passenger trains ran to these last two only.

There is no evidence that any advertised public service ever called at the halt. The public passenger service through its site, plying between Lowca and Workington Central called at Rosehill (Archer Street Halt) which was some 250 yards to the north.

A workmen's service ran north from Lowca from April 1912. It appears to have called at Rose Hill Platform, but there is considerable doubt if there was even a physical platform in place.

Details of the workmen's service are sketchy. A letter from Workington Iron and Steel Company's parliamentary agent to the Board of Trade on 2 December 1912 stated "..the line is being used [...] for the purpose of conveying workmen between Harrington and the works of the Promoters..." A photograph taken of the first public train on 2 June 1913 shows it at the workmen's platform at Lowca, the public platform yet not being ready. Standard works, notably Quick and Butt, make no mention of services at Lowca before 2 June 1913, nor at Micklam or Copperas Hill. They also give Rosehill (Archer Street Halt) as opening on 2 June 1913. This suggests that the workmen's service called at Moss Bay Cart Siding/Workington Central, Rose Hill Platform and Lowca Workmen's Platform. The mention of "...conveying workmen between Harrington and the works..." and entries in Croughton and Quick give tentative support to the Rose Hill Platform (a.k.a. Junction) call. Ex-employees writing later state "Miners' trains went up the private railway from Rosehill Box, where Pat McGuire, the "singing signalman" operated." Some later authors appear to conflate Rosehill Platform (a.k.a. Rose Hill Platform) and Archer St Halt.

A public passenger service passed the halt between 2 June 1913 and May 1926. This was in essence an "upgraded" workmen's train, composed of the ancient workmen's coaches with a "public" coach tacked on. No source records this stopping between Archer Street and Copperas Hill. It is possible that when the public service ended in May 1926, the unadvertised workmen's trains which carried on until 1929 could have resorted to calling at Rose Hill Platform instead of or as well as Archer Street. Further research is needed.

== Freight services ==
The railway through the halt was first and foremost a mineral railway, with the short-lived workmen's and passenger services an afterthought. A waggonway had climbed Rose Hill itself in the first half of the nineteenth century, connecting Harrington harbour with John Pit and Hodgson Pit. Later developments eventually ran northwards towards Workington and northeastwards to meet the Gilgarran Branch at Bain's Siding. The driving forces were coal at Lowca, fireclay and bricks at Micklam (primarily aimed at lining furnaces at Workington's steelworks), coke and coking bi-products. Centrepiece for over fifty years was Harrington No. 10 Colliery which, confusingly, was not in Harrington, but in Lowca.

Between them these industrial concerns sustained the railway through the site of the halt until final closure to all traffic in May 1973.

== A British record ==
The halt was ephemeral and short-lived, but the track immediately to its south has its place in the railway record books. Its southbound uphill gradient of 1 in 17 was the steepest adhesion-worked British incline carrying a regular, timetabled passenger service.

== Afterlife ==
The track through the station site was lifted by the end of 1973. The trackbed now forms part of the Cumbrian Way.

Preceding station	Disused railways	Following station
Rosehill (Archer Street Halt); Line and station closed	Lowca Light Railway	Copperas Hill; Line and station closed

== See also ==
- Gilgarran Branch
- Cleator and Workington Junction Railway

== Sources ==
- Andrews, Dr Michael (May 2001). Peascod, Michael (ed.). "The Harrington and Lowca Light Railway". Cumbrian Railways. 7 (2). Pinner: Cumbrian Railways Association. ISSN 1466-6812.
- Anderson, Paul (April 2002). Hawkins, Chris (ed.). "Dog in the Manger? The Track of the Ironmasters". British Railways Illustrated. 11 (7). Clophill: Irwell Press Ltd.
- Bradshaw, George (1985) [July 1922]. Bradshaw's General Railway and Steam Navigation guide for Great Britain and Ireland: A reprint of the July 1922 issue. Newton Abbot: David & Charles. ISBN 978-0-7153-8708-5. OCLC 12500436.
- Croughton, Godfrey; Kidner, R. W.; Young, Alan (1982). Private and Untimetabled Railway Stations, Halts and Stopping Places. The Oakwood Press. ISBN 978-0-85361-281-0. OCLC 10507501.
- Jackson, Stanley; Sisson, Norman; Haywood, T.R. (August 1982a). Peascod, Michael (ed.). "The Cleator and Workington Junction Railway". Cumbrian Railways. 2 (11). Pinner: Cumbrian Railways Association. ISSN 1466-6812.
- McGowan Gradon, W. (2004) [1952]. The Track of the Ironmasters: A History of the Cleator and Workington Junction Railway. Grange-over-Sands: Cumbrian Railways Association. ISBN 0-9540232-2-6.
- Quick, Michael (September 2009). Railway Passenger Stations in Great Britain - a Chronology. Railway & Canal Historical Society. ISBN 978-0-901461-57-5.
- Robinson, Peter W. (1985). Railways of Cumbria. Clapham, via Lancaster: Dalesman Books. ISBN 0-85206-815-8.
