= Parton =

Parton may refer to:

== People ==
=== Arts and entertainment ===
- David Parton (born 1948), English singer-songwriter and record producer
- Dolly Parton (1946–2026), American country singer, songwriter, composer, author, and actress
- Lucy Rose Parton (born 1989), English singer-songwriter
- Rachel Parton George (born 1959), American singer and actress
- Randy Parton (1953–2021), American country singer and business person
- Sarah Jane Parton (born 1980), New Zealand new media artist
- Samantha (Sam) Parton, musician with The Be Good Tanyas
- Stella Parton (born 1949), American country singer
- Tim Parton, American pianist

=== Sport ===
- Dick Parton (1917–2006), Australian rules footballer
- Jeff Parton (born 1953), Welsh football goalkeeper
- John Parton (1863–1906), English cricketer
- Mabel Parton (1881–1962), British tennis player
- Tom Parton, English rugby player
- Tony Parton (born 1967), English cricketer

=== Other fields ===
- James Parton (1822–1891), American biographer
- Jim Parton, fathers' rights activist
- Mark Parton (born 1966), Australian politician
- V. R. Parton (1897–1974), English chess player

== Places ==
- Parton, Cumbria, England
- Parton, Dumfries and Galloway, Scotland
- Parton, Herefordshire, England; see List of places in Herefordshire § P

== Railway stations ==
- Parton railway station, in Cumbria, England
- Parton Halt railway station, also in Cumbria, near to but different from, Parton railway station
- Parton (P&WJR) railway station, in Dumfries and Galloway, Scotland

== Other uses ==
- Parton (particle physics), is the name of a model for subatomic particles
