= Harrington railway station =

Railway station in Cumbria, England

Harrington
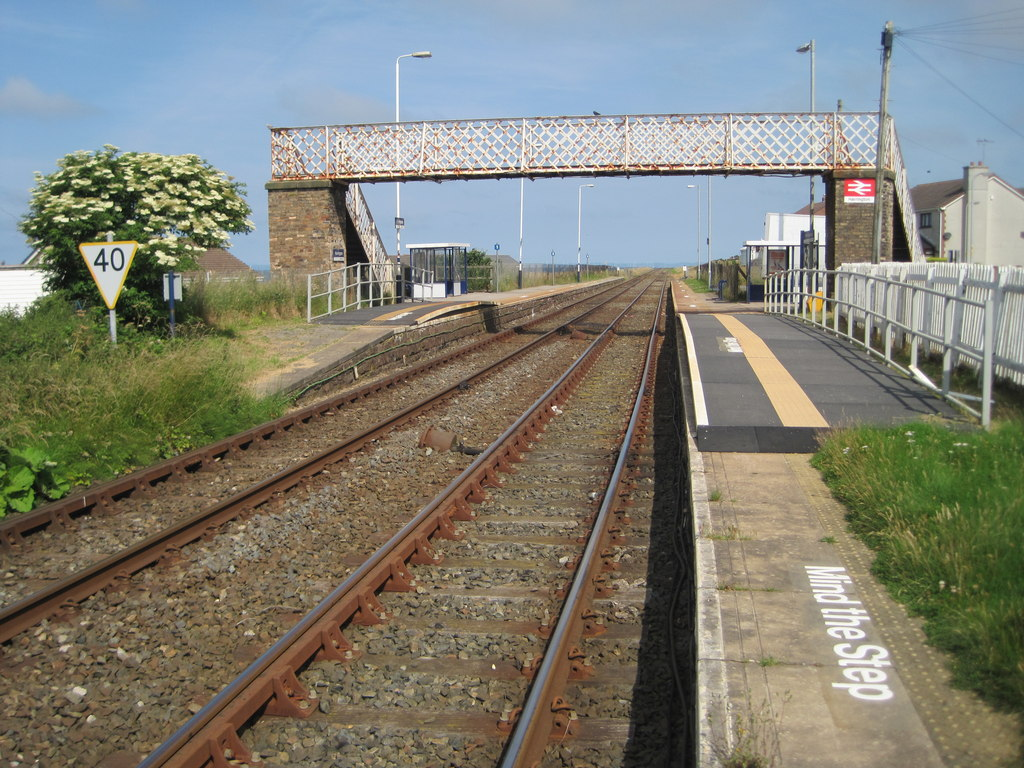

General information
- Location: Harrington, Cumberland; England
- Coordinates: 54°36′49″N 3°33′56″W
- Grid reference: NX990253
- Owner: Network Rail
- Manager: Northern Trains
- Platforms: 2
- Tracks: 2

Other information
- Station code: HRR
- Classification: DfT category F2

History
- Original company: Whitehaven Junction Railway
- Pre-grouping: London and North Western Railway
- Post-grouping: London, Midland and Scottish Railway; British Rail (London Midland Region)

Key dates
- 18 May 1846: Opened

Passengers
- 2021/22: ▲26,568
- 2022/23: ▼26,496
- 2023/24: ▲27,854
- 2024/25: ▲36,300
- 2025/26: ▼32,224
Location
- Location within the former Allerdale Borough Location within Cumbria
Notes
- Passenger statistics from the Office of Rail and Road

Harrington railway station is a railway station serving the village of Harrington in Cumbria, England. It is on the Cumbrian Coast Line, which runs between Carlisle and Barrow-in-Furness. It is owned by Network Rail and managed by Northern Trains.

== Harrington Hump ==
The station came to national prominence in 2008 when it was chosen as the initial site for the installation of an experimental ramp to raise the height of the platform to improve access to modern rolling stock. Christened the Harrington Hump, the ramp was built for £25,000 – 10% of the estimated cost of the conventional rebuilding that would have otherwise been required to make the platform fully DDA compliant. The modular design has since been deployed at several other rural stations across the UK where the cost of platform upgrades would otherwise have been considered prohibitive.

== Facilities ==
The station is unstaffed (like most others on the route), but now has been provided with a ticket machine to allow passengers to buy tickets before travelling. Shelters are located on both platforms, which are linked by a footbridge, which was removed for three months beginning November 2022 for an overhaul. Step-free access is available only on the southbound side (where the main entrance is situated). Train running information is provided via telephone, digital information screens and timetable posters.

== Service ==
There is generally an hourly service northbound to Carlisle and southbound to Whitehaven with most trains going onward to Barrow-in-Furness (no late evening service operates south of Whitehaven). A few through trains operate to/from Lancaster via the Furness Line.

Train operator Northern introduced a regular Sunday through service to Barrow via the coast at the May 2018 timetable change – the first such service south of Whitehaven for more than 40 years. Services run approximately hourly from mid-morning until early evening, with later trains terminating at Whitehaven. This represents a major upgrade on the former infrequent service of four per day each way to/from Whitehaven only that previously operated. In addition, it was announced that Harrington would no longer be a request stop.

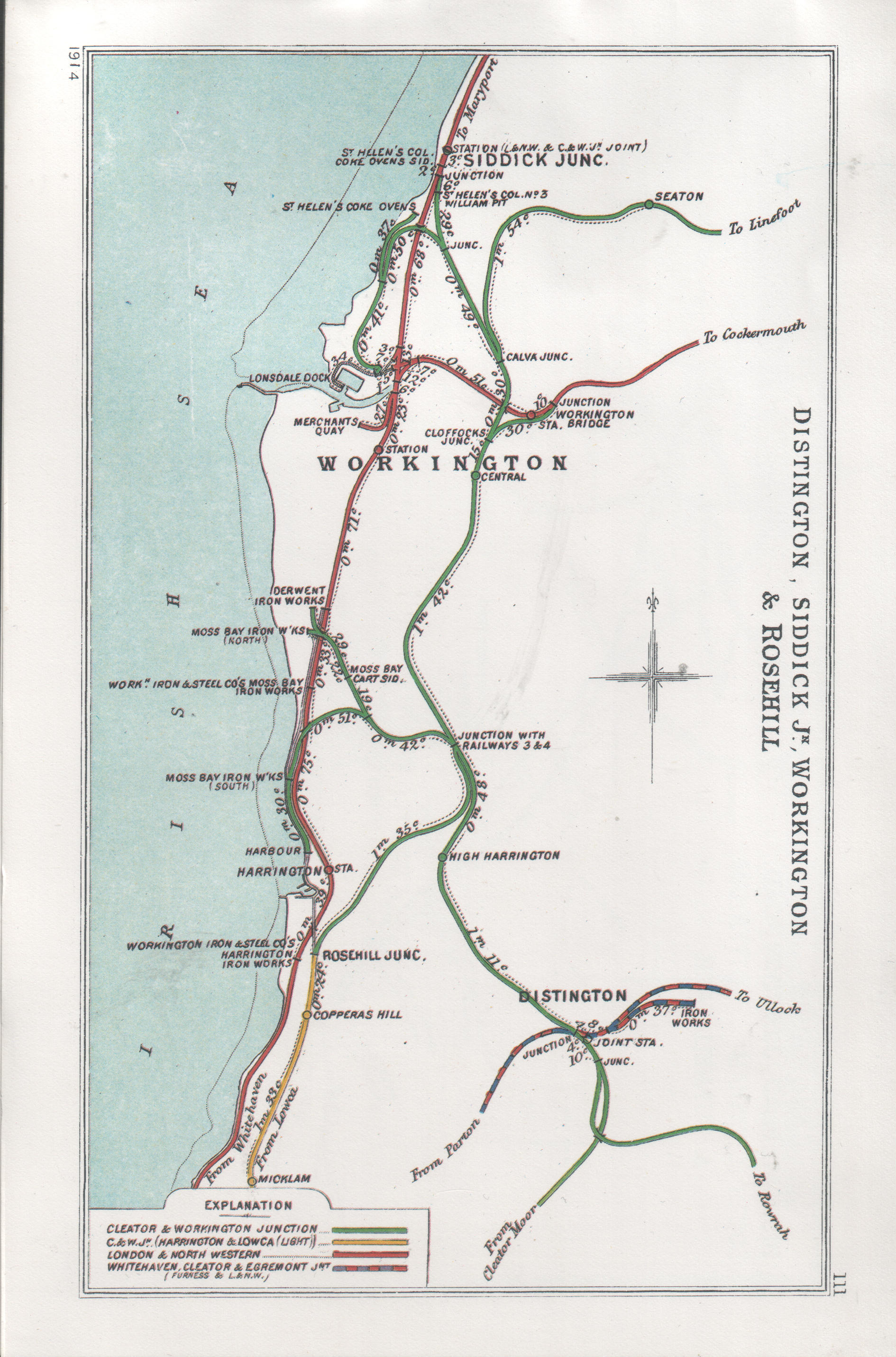
A 1914 Railway Clearing House Junction Diagram showing the complex network which existed in the Workington area

Preceding station	National Rail	Following station
Workington	Northern Trains; Cumbrian Coast Line	Parton
	Historical railways	
Workington	London and North Western Railway; Whitehaven Junction Railway	Parton
