= Copperas Hill railway station =

Disused railway station in Cumbria, England

Copperas Hill
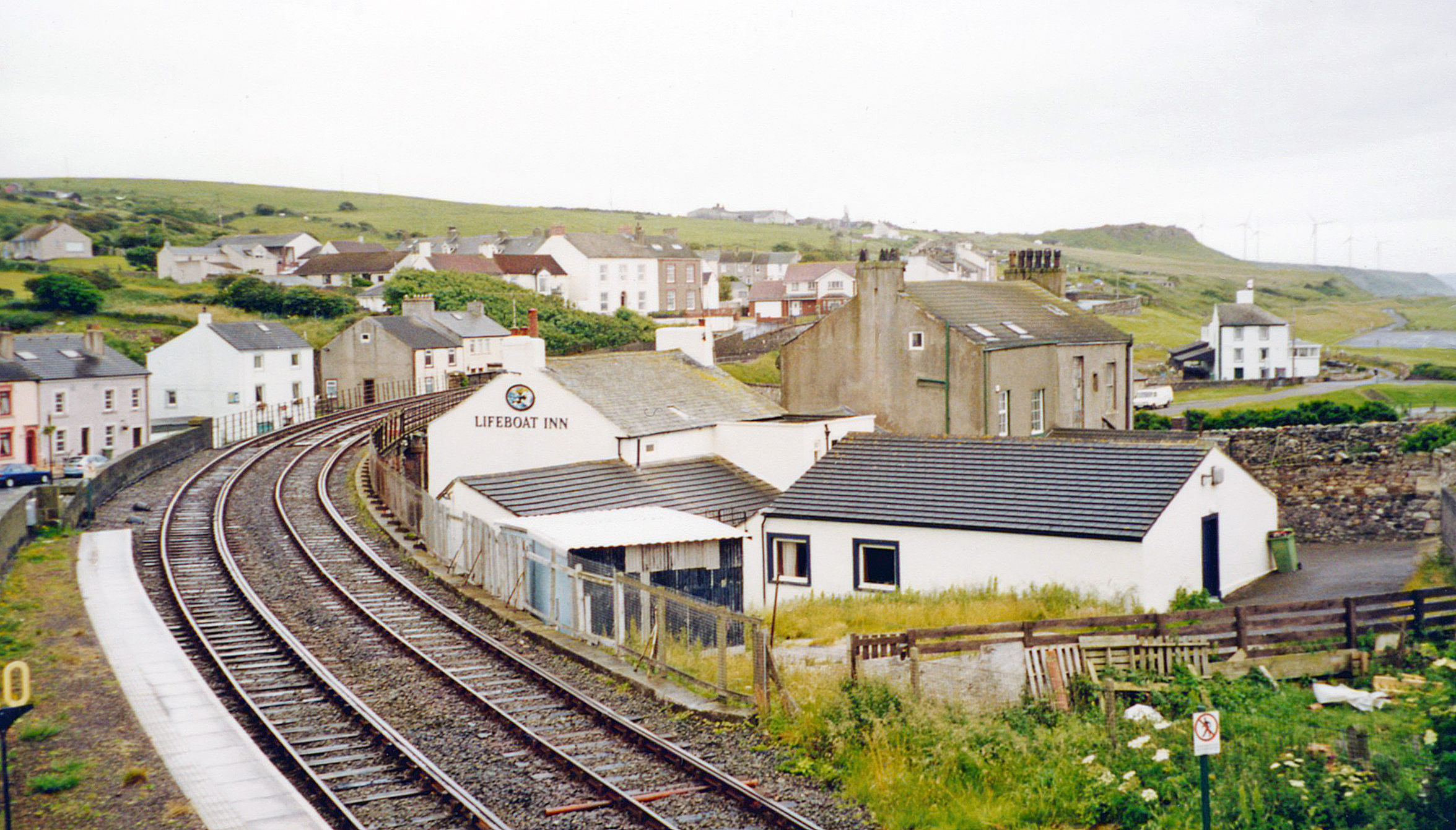
- The site of the station in 2002

General information
- Location: Copperas Hill, near Harrington, Cumberland; England
- Coordinates: 54.6042°N 3.5688°W
- Grid reference: NX987243
- Platforms: 1

Other information
- Status: Disused

History
- Original company: Lowca Light Railway
- Post-grouping: Lowca Light Railway

Key dates
- 15 April 1912: Workmen's service commenced
- 2 June 1913: Public passenger service
- September 1921: Last appeared in Bradshaw
- 1 April 1929: Workmen's service ended
Location

Copperas Hill railway station served the small clifftop community of Copperas Hill, south of Harrington in the former county of Cumberland, England, which is now part of Cumbria.

A public passenger service called at the station between 2 June 1913 and September 1921, though unadvertised workmen's trains had started in April 1912 and continued until April 1929, after which all forms of passenger service ceased.

By 1922 the service had settled down to three trains each way between Lowca and Workington Central, though, surprisingly in that age, trains had stopped calling at Copperas Hill in September 1921. There never was a public Sunday service.

The station was on the Harrington and Lowca Light Railway which connected with the Cleator & Workington Junction Railway (CWJR) at Rosehill Junction a short distance north of Copperas Hill and south of Harrington Village. Workmen's services to and from Copperas Hill variously ran from Moss Bay Cart Siding, Maryport (during the First World War), Workington Central and Seaton (Cumbria). Public passenger trains ran to these last two only.

== Freight services ==
The railway through Copperas Hill was first and foremost a mineral railway, with the short-lived workmen's and passenger services an afterthought. A waggonway had reached a chemical works at the station site in the first half of the nineteenth century, connecting Harrington harbour with John Pit and Hodgson Pit. Later developments, eventually ran northwards towards Workington and northeastwards to meet the Gilgarran Branch at Bain's Siding. The driving forces were coal at Lowca, fireclay and bricks (primarily aimed at lining furnaces at Workington's steelworks), coke and coking bi-products. Centrepiece for over fifty years was Harrington No. 10 Colliery which, confusingly, was not in Harrington, but in Lowca.

Between them these industrial concerns sustained the railway through Copperas Hill until final closure to all traffic in May 1973.

Although closed in 1921 the station was still in good shape in 1969.

== A British record ==
Copperas Hill station was short-lived, but the track immediately north of the station has its place in the railway record books. Its southbound uphill gradient of 1 in 17 was the steepest adhesion-worked British incline carrying a regular, timetabled passenger service.

== Afterlife ==
The track through the station site was lifted by the end of 1973. The trackbed now forms part of the Cumbrian Way.

Preceding station	Disused railways	Following station
Rose Hill Platform; Line and station closed	Lowca Light Railway	Micklam; Line and station closed

== See also ==
- Gilgarran Branch
- Cleator and Workington Junction Railway

== Sources ==
- Andrews, Dr Michael (May 2001). Peascod, Michael (ed.). "The Harrington and Lowca Light Railway". Cumbrian Railways. 7 (2). Pinner: Cumbrian Railways Association. ISSN 1466-6812.
- Bradshaw, George (1985) [July 1922]. Bradshaw's General Railway and Steam Navigation guide for Great Britain and Ireland: A reprint of the July 1922 issue. Newton Abbot: David & Charles. ISBN 978-0-7153-8708-5. OCLC 12500436.
- McGowan Gradon, W. (2004) [1952]. The Track of the Ironmasters: A History of the Cleator and Workington Junction Railway. Grange-over-Sands: Cumbrian Railways Association. ISBN 978-0-9540232-2-5.
- Robinson, Peter W. (1985). Railways of Cumbria. Clapham, North Yorkshire: Dalesman Books. ISBN 978-0-85206-815-1.
- Robinson, Peter W. (2002). Cumbria's Lost Railways. Catrine: Stenlake Publishing. ISBN 978-1-84033-205-6.
