= Moss Bay Cart Siding railway station =

Railway station

Moss Bay Cart Siding

General information
- Location: Moss Bay Road, Workington, Cumberland; England
- Coordinates: 54.6280°N 3.5634°W
- Grid reference: NX991269
- Platforms: 1 (probable)

Other information
- Status: Disused

History
- Original company: Cleator and Workington Junction Railway
- Post-grouping: London, Midland and Scottish Railway

Key dates
- 15 April 1912: Workmen's service commenced
- before 2 June 1913: Service moved to Workington Central
- 11 July 1915: Sundays Only workmen's service commenced
- by 1 January 1919: Workmen's service ended
Location

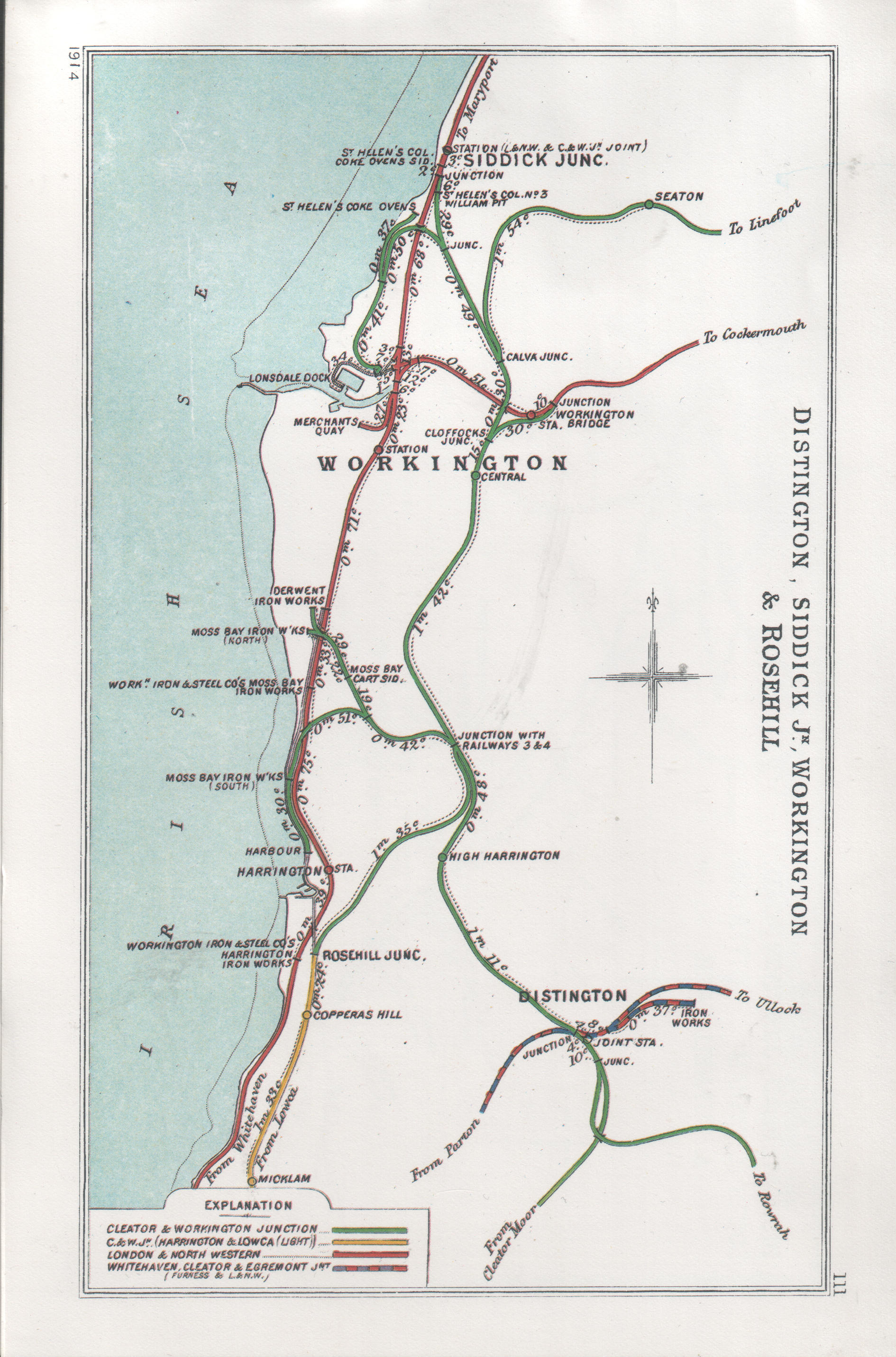
A 1914 Railway Clearing House Junction Diagram showing the siding

Moss Bay Cart Siding was used for two periods as a temporary northern terminus for workmen's trains to Lowca. It was situated where Moss Bay Road crossed the CWJR's Derwent Branch in southern Workington in the former county of Cumberland, England, which is now part of Cumbria.

No public passenger service ever called at the station.

The first period of use began on 15 April 1912 when the new workmen's service to Micklam and Lowca began. The service was moved from the Cart Siding to start at Workington Central at some time before July 1913. This service ran along what would become the Lowca Light Railway (LLR).

The second period of use began on 11 July 1915, when two Sundays Only workmen's trains commenced running to meet exceptional wartime need. This service was to run "for the duration." It is not mentioned in the CWJR's July 1920 Working Time Table. This service ran along the LLR.

No photographs have been published of the station or its site.

The track past the siding remained in use to serve Wilkinsons Wagon Works until 1962.

By 2013 no trace of the site remained.

Preceding station	Disused railways	Following station
Terminus	CWJR; Derwent Branch	Harrington (Church Road Halt); Line and station closed

== See also ==
- Gilgarran Branch
- Cleator and Workington Junction Railway

== Sources ==
- Andrews, Dr Michael (May 2001). Peascod, Michael (ed.). "The Harrington and Lowca Light Railway". Cumbrian Railways. 7 (2). Pinner: Cumbrian Railways Association. ISSN 1466-6812.
- Bradshaw, George (1985) [July 1922]. Bradshaw's General Railway and Steam Navigation guide for Great Britain and Ireland: A reprint of the July 1922 issue. Newton Abbot: David & Charles. ISBN 978-0-7153-8708-5. OCLC 12500436.
- McGowan Gradon, W. (2004) [1952]. The Track of the Ironmasters: A History of the Cleator and Workington Junction Railway. Grange-over-Sands: Cumbrian Railways Association. ISBN 978-0-9540232-2-5.
- Robinson, Peter W. (1985). Railways of Cumbria. Clapham, via Lancaster: Dalesman Books. ISBN 978-0-85206-815-1.
