= Parton Halt railway station =

Disused railway station in Cumbria, England

Parton Halt
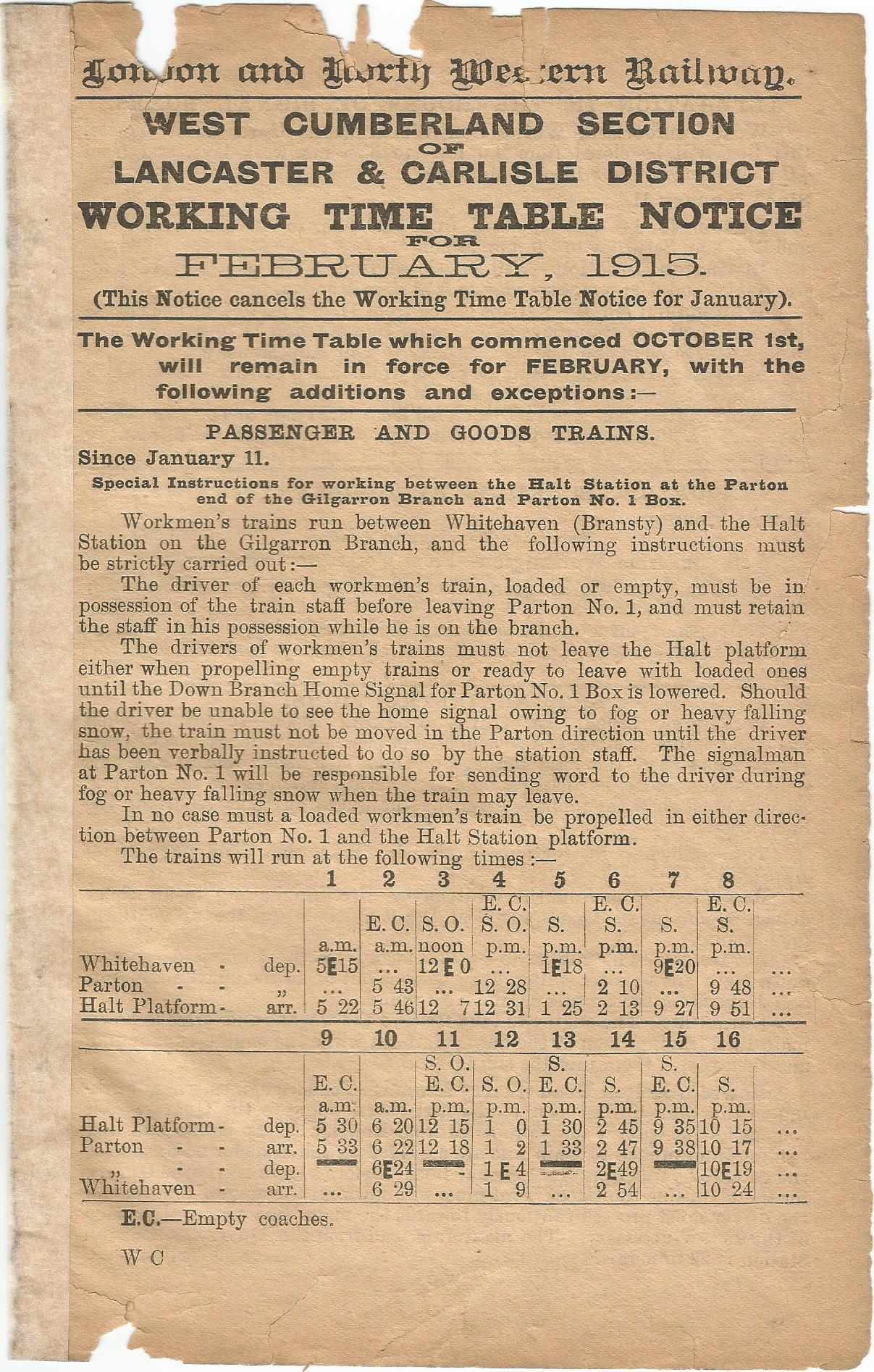
- The LNWR Working Time Table for the halt, February 1915

General information
- Location: Parton, north of Whitehaven, Cumberland; England
- Coordinates: 54.5747°N 3.5781°W
- Grid reference: NX980210
- Platforms: 1

Other information
- Status: Disused

History
- Original company: LNWR & Furness Joint Railway
- Post-grouping: London, Midland and Scottish Railway

Key dates
- 1 January 1915: Opened to workmen's trains
- 1 April 1929: Closed
- 2 November 1929: Demolished
Location

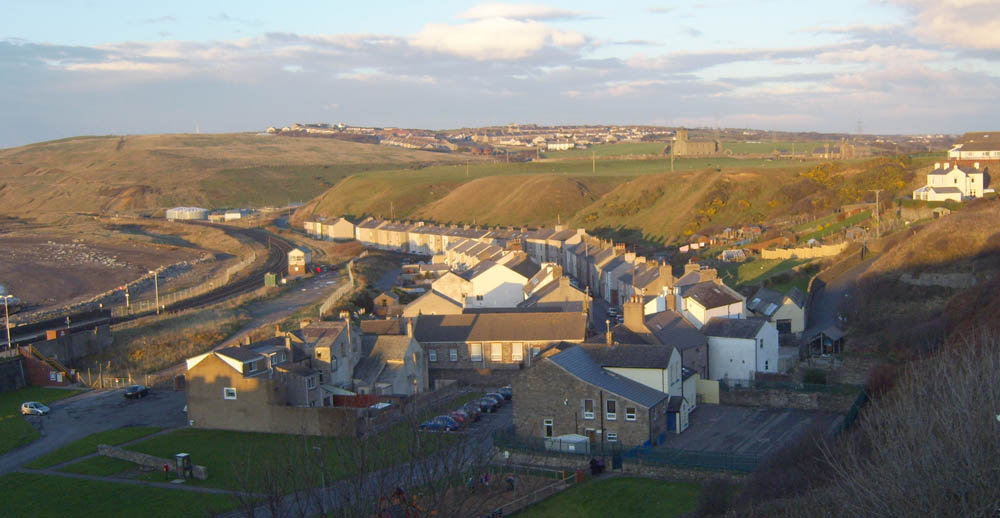
Looking north at Parton. No.1 signalbox - since demolished - can be seen. Lowca village is on the centre hilltop, the colliery etc. were to the village's left. The halt was to the right of what looks like a gas holder below the pit site. The Gilgarran Branch curved right up the valley below Lowca village. The coast line curves left round the headland.

Parton Halt railway station was opened by the LNWR and FR Joint Railway ("The Joint Line") in January 1915 and closed by the LMSR fourteen years later in 1929.

The halt never appeared on any public timetable, as it was provided to enable workmen to get from Whitehaven to the isolated colliery, coke ovens and bi-products plant on the hilltop at Lowca. The halt was at the foot of steep tracks up to these workplaces.

== Location ==
The line past the halt is clearly shown on standard railway maps, but the halt eludes them all; however, it is shown on contemporary OS maps. It is not to be confused with Parton which in 2015 remained on the Cumbrian Coast Line 25 chains (0.50 km) to the south of the site of the halt.

Further research is needed to establish the physical nature of the halt, such structures in many parts of the country were very rudimentary.

== History ==
The halt was on the WCER's Gilgarran Branch, occasionally referred to as the Gilgarron Branch. The company and the branch were fruits of the rapid industrialisation of West Cumberland in the second half of the nineteenth century.

All lines in the area were primarily aimed at mineral traffic, notably iron ore, coal and limestone, few more so than the Gilgarran Branch. Many iron mines, quarries, collieries and attendant works were situated in inaccessible areas with low populations, making workmen's trains a natural add-on service. Lowca had a workmen's service - and for a shorter period an advertised passenger service - from the north along the clifftops provided by the Lowca Light Railway in conjunction with the Cleator and Workington Junction Railway (CWJR). The service to Parton Halt met the same need from the south.

== Services ==
No Sunday passenger service was provided.

A passenger service from Distington to Whitehaven along the Gilgarran Branch had run from 1881 to 1883, but it was not a success and was withdrawn. A Thursdays and Saturdays only (Market Days) service was run from Distington to Whitehaven, calling or changing at Parton from autumn 1913 (sources disagree whether from October or November) to September 1914, these trains passed the site of the future Parton Halt, but served a different purpose.

The initial service, which started on 11 January 1915, can be seen on the attached Working Time table (WTT) extract. Service times were set to match shift changes at the colliery and associated works. This was a common pattern with such halts across the country.

Goods traffic passed the halt, but did not call. The April 1917 Working Time Table shows three Up mineral trains travelling a mile beyond the halt to No 4 Pit and two travelling beyond to Distington Ironworks, with an extra on Saturdays, all matched by Down trains.

The line past the site of the halt went on to become a late survivor on the West Cumberland scene. The colliery at Lowca wound coal until 1968, feeding the associated works. After it closed coal continued to come from Solway Colliery, Workington until it closed in 1973, at which point the surviving business for the bi-product works and coal washery at Lowca was handled by road. The end products from Lowca were taken away northwards along the clifftops using the surviving parts of the Lowca Light Railway. Incoming coal from Solway Colliery was worked south along the coast line to Parton, where the train reversed 1 mile 11 chains (1.8 km) up the Gilgarron Branch, past the site of the halt to a junction known as "Bain's Siding" where it ran forward up the side of the valley to Lowca, effecting a zig-zag to gain the necessary height. Until 1968 at least, coal was also wound at No.4 Pit near Bain's Siding and taken down the branch past the site of the halt.

== Rundown and closure ==
The halt closed in 1929, with buses able to provide a more attractive door-to-workplace gate service. The line past its site closed in May 1973. Nearby sidings were retained for many more years for civil engineers, but have since been lifted.

== Afterlife ==
By 2013 most of the trackbed through the halt had been obliterated. Further towards Distington the Gilgarran Branch's route had been recycled as a public cycleway.

Preceding station	Disused railways	Following station
Parton; Line closed, station open	LNWR & FR Joint Railway; Gilgarran Branch	Distington; Line and station closed

== See also ==
- Furness Railway
- Whitehaven, Cleator and Egremont Railway
- Cleator and Workington Junction Railway
