= Harrington Hump =

Railway platform elevation method

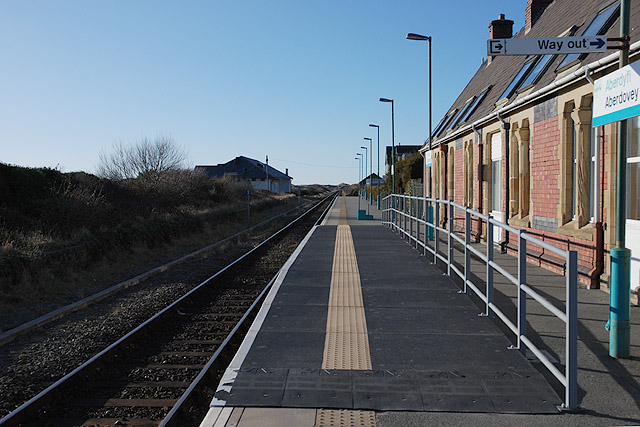
Harrington Hump at Aberdovey railway station, 2010

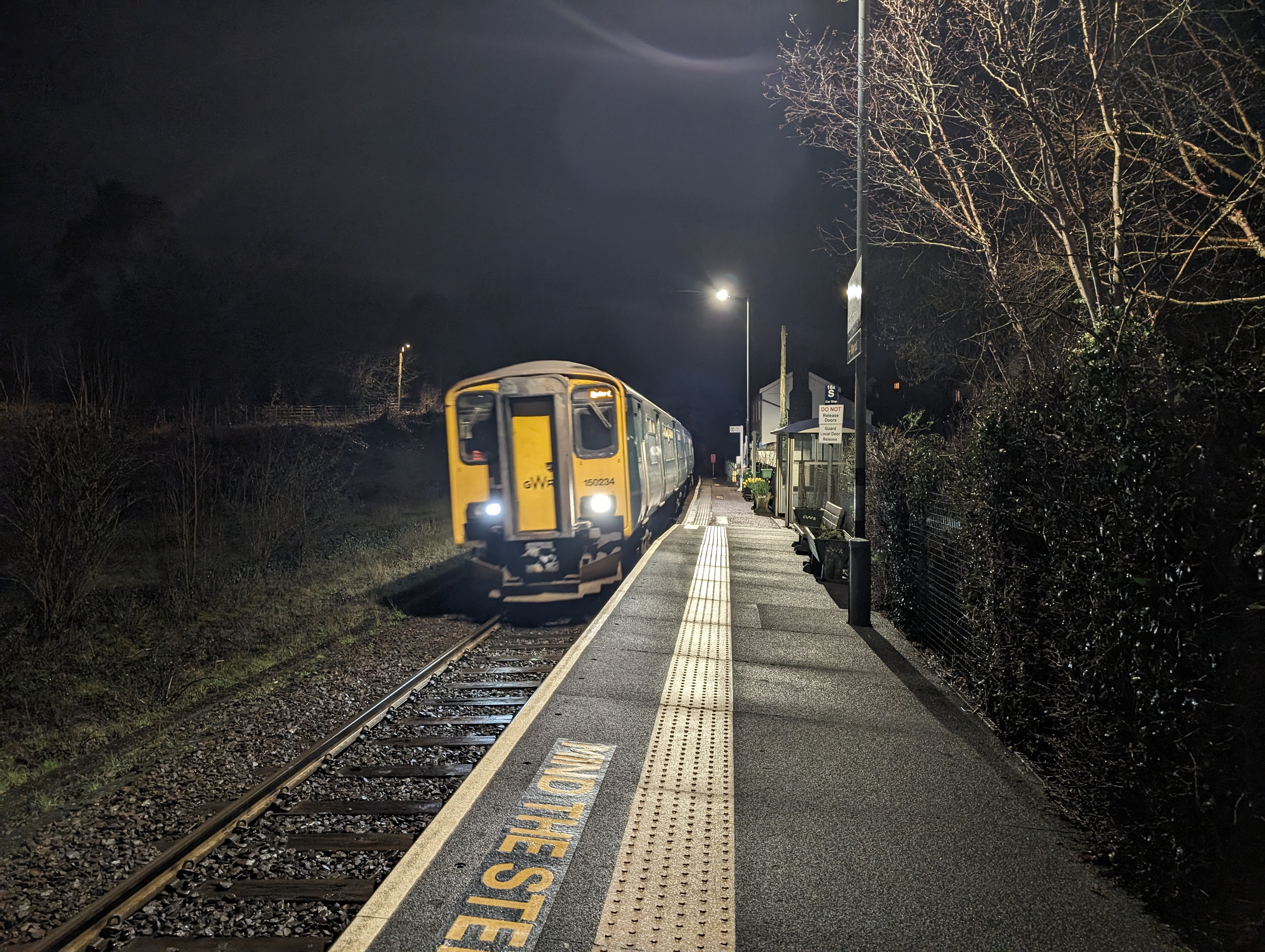
Harrington Hump at Newton St Cyres railway station, 2024

The Harrington Hump is a modular, easy-to-install system by which the height of a railway platform can be increased at relatively low cost. The system takes its name from Harrington railway station in Cumbria, England, which is the location of the first production version. Since 2011, Harrington Humps have been installed gradually at other railway stations in the UK and elsewhere.

== Background ==
Platform height across the UK rail network is not standardised because, at the time of the construction of the network, different railway companies settled on different platform heights. Platforms sited low (compared to the level of the train carriage floor) present entry and exit problems to mobility-impaired passengers, including wheelchair users. Raising the level of a complete platform is relatively costly and in many instances beyond the means of Network Rail and local authorities.

The impetus for the hump, it is claimed, was a complaint by the chairman of the Copeland Rail Users' Group that low platforms on the Cumbrian Coast Line caused users difficulty in boarding and alighting from trains, made at Allerdale Area Transport Advisory Group, a sub-committee of Cumbria County Council's Local Committee. A suggestion of a partial raising of platforms was made to parry a Network Rail assertion that remedial work would cost a "six-figure sum" per station.

== The Hump ==
The Harrington Hump is a partial solution to the long-standing problem of user access to railway carriages from relatively low station platforms. The Hump is a pair of ramps and a short flat top, built from a glass-reinforced polymer. It is capable of being designed to meet the width and height requirements of a particular station, and can be installed in a few days. Installing a Harrington Hump is much cheaper than raising the entire length of the platform – to the order of 1/10th of the typical £250,000 cost.

The Hump was devised by Network Rail and Cumbria County Council, in conjunction with Pipex Structural Composites, and was installed first at Harrington railway station in December 2008. It is claimed that Harrington was chosen as the pilot site because it has the greatest drop from train floor to platform and, as a coastal station, is subject to the most corrosive atmosphere. Otherwise known as an "Easy Access Area", Network Rail has conceded that the structure will be known henceforth by its nickname, Harrington Hump.

The Hump is positioned to align with a particular door on a train, usually one designed for wheelchair access. Consequently, the Hump is less suited to platforms served by different configurations of trains, such as at Dalton railway station, where wheelchair accommodation doors are often located in different positions on different trains.

The second Hump was installed at St Albans Abbey railway station and the third at Aberdovey railway station. Other stations to receive Humps include Northwich, Flixton, Whaley Bridge, Eccles, Kents Bank and Hadfield.

The Hump system won a Delivery of Customer Service Award at the 2009 Civil Service Diversity and Equality Awards.

In February 2019, a Hump was proposed for Marsden railway station in West Yorkshire, which would alleviate the problem of a 45 cm drop from train to platform

== Innovative aspects ==
According to the Association of Community Rail Partnerships, innovative aspects of the Hump are that:

- it is cheap
- it does not require possession to install
- it is capable of local hand assembly without large power tools
- it is capable of being used across the network
- it has a design life (50 years)
- it is safe and provides standard height access to train doors
- it meets network standards or provides a reason for variation
- it is able to be installed by four people
- it is capable of installation in three days

== Other UK station humps ==
Similar humps have been installed on the London Underground. Between 2010 and 2011, they were provided at all of the Victoria line stations except Pimlico. The Underground humps are of a masonry construction and thus are not Harringtons. The impetus for their installation are the Rail Vehicle Accessibility (Non Interoperable Rail System) Regulations 2010, and the Disability Discrimination Act 1995.
