= Lowca railway station =

Disused railway station in Cumbria, England

Lowca
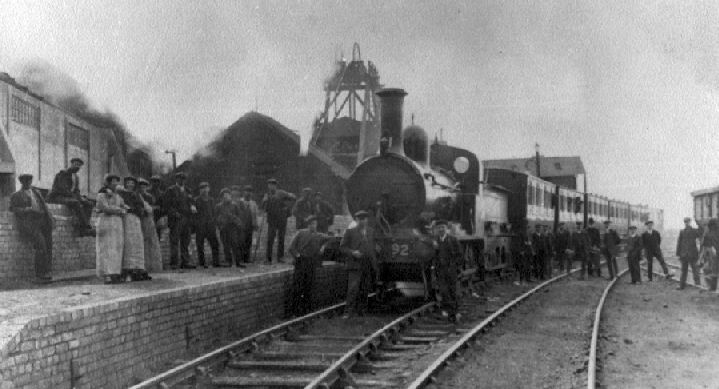
- Lowca's 1st station in the colliery yard, probably on 2 June 1913

General information
- Location: Lowca, Cumbria; England
- Coordinates: 54.5817°N 3.5808°W
- Grid reference: NX979218
- Platforms: 1

Other information
- Status: Disused

History
- Original company: Bain's Mineral Railway
- Pre-grouping: Harrington and Lowca Light Railway
- Post-grouping: Harrington and Lowca Light Railway

Key dates
- 15 April 1912: Workmen's service commenced
- 2 June 1913: Public passenger service
- 31 May 1926: Public passenger service ended
- 1 April 1929: Workmen's service ended
Location

Lowca had two railway stations that served the village of Lowca in the former county of Cumberland, England, which is now part of Cumbria.

The line was originally a waggonway that conveyed coal from a drift mine at Lowca to Harrington Harbour and later to Harrington Iron Works. As the demand for greater quantities of coal to feed the ironworks was most important new mines with vertical shafts were sunk. These were named after the parent ironworks and took the name of Harrington with a shaft number to identify them, such as Harrington No.4 and Harrington No.9.

A public passenger service ran from the first station between 2 June 1913 and when the second Lowca Station was completed in August 1913 public services ran until they ceased in May 1926. Unadvertised workmen's trains had started in April 1912 and ran between Moss Bay Cart Siding and the colliery station in the pit yard. After the light railway order ended the private workmen's service continued until April 1929, after which the workmen's trains ceased.

By 1922 the service had settled down to three trains each way between Lowca and Workington Central, with an extra on Saturdays. There never was a public Sunday service.

The first station at Lowca was built by Bain & Co. who owned the colliery and Harrington Ironworks. It was situated in the colliery yard and was closed to public passenger use when the second station at Lowca was opened in August 1913.

The second station was on the Harrington and Lowca Light Railway which connected with the Cleator and Workington Junction Railway (CWJR) at Rosehill Junction south of Harrington Village. At different times workmen's services to Lowca ran from four places: Maryport (during the First World War), Moss Bay Cart Siding, Workington Central and Seaton (Cumbria). Public passenger trains ran from these last two only.

For many years there has been confusion regarding the stations at Lowca, with the two stations in the village being treated as one. The first official passenger service terminated in the colliery yard as shown in the photo. The 1st station continued in use until 1929 for workmen's trains but for passenger use the 2nd Lowca Station was the terminus.

== Freight services ==
The railway through Lowca was first and foremost a mineral railway, with the short-lived workmen's and passenger services an afterthought. Lines first reached Lowca at the end of the Nineteenth Century, eventually running northwards towards Workington and southeastwards to meet the Gilgarran Branch at Bain's Siding. The driving forces were coal, fireclay at nearby Micklam, coke and coking bi-products. Centrepiece for over fifty years was Harrington No. 10 Colliery which, confusingly, was not in Harrington, but in Lowca.

Between them these industrial concerns sustained the railway through Lowca until final closure to all traffic in May 1973.

Preceding station	Disused railways	Following station
Micklam; Line and station closed	Lowca Light Railway	Lowca's 1st Station

== See also ==
- Gilgarran Branch
- Cleator and Workington Junction Railway

== Sources ==
- Andrews, Dr Michael (May 2001). Peascod, Michael (ed.). "The Harrington and Lowca Light Railway". Cumbrian Railways. 7 (2). Pinner: Cumbrian Railways Association. ISSN 1466-6812.
- Bradshaw, George (1985) [July 1922]. Bradshaw's General Railway and Steam Navigation guide for Great Britain and Ireland: A reprint of the July 1922 issue. Newton Abbot: David & Charles. ISBN 978-0-7153-8708-5. OCLC 12500436.
- Oakden, Steven (July 2003). Smith, Martin (ed.). "Railway Work at Harrington. The later years at Harrington No. 10 Colliery". Railway Bylines. 8 (8). Clophill: Irwell Press Ltd.
