= Micklam railway station =

Disused railway station in Cumbria, England

Micklam

General information
- Location: Micklam, near Lowca, Cumberland; England
- Coordinates: 54.5859°N 3.5782°W
- Grid reference: NX981223
- Platforms: 1

Other information
- Status: Disused

History
- Original company: Lowca Light Railway
- Post-grouping: Lowca Light Railway

Key dates
- 15 April 1912: Workmen's service commenced
- 2 June 1913: Public passenger service
- 31 May 1926: Public passenger service ended
- 1 April 1929: Workmen's service ended
Location

Micklam railway station served the fireclay mine and brickworks at Micklam, a short distance north of Lowca in the former county of Cumberland, England, which is now part of Cumbria.

A public passenger service called at the station between 2 June 1913 and May 1926, though unadvertised workmen's trains had started in April 1912 and continued until April 1929, after which all forms of passenger service ceased.

By 1922 the service had settled down to three trains each way between Lowca and Workington Central, calling at Micklam. There was an extra on Saturdays, but it passed through Micklam without stopping.. There never was a public Sunday service.

The station was on the Harrington and Lowca Light Railway which connected with the Cleator & Workington Junction Railway (CWJR) at Rosehill Junction south of Harrington Village. Workmen's services to and from Micklam variously ran from Moss Bay Cart Siding, Maryport (during the First World War), Workington Central and Seaton (Cumbria). Public passenger trains ran to these last two only.

== Freight services ==
The railway through Micklam was first and foremost a mineral railway, with the short-lived workmen's and passenger services an afterthought. Lines first reached the site at the end of the Nineteenth Century, eventually running northwards towards Workington and southeastwards to meet the Gilgarran Branch at Bain's Siding. The driving forces were coal at Lowca, fireclay and bricks (primarily aimed at lining furnaces at Workington's steelworks), coke and coking bi-products. Centrepiece for over fifty years was Harrington No. 10 Colliery which, confusingly, was not in Harrington, but in Lowca.

A seldom-photographed 2 feet 6 inches (760 mm) railway emerged from the fireclay drift mine then ran parallel to the Lowca Light railway along the clifftop to Micklam brickworks.

Between them these industrial concerns sustained the railway through Micklam until final closure to all traffic in May 1973.

Preceding station	Disused railways	Following station
Copperas Hill; Line and station closed	Lowca Light Railway	Lowca; Line and station closed

== See also ==
- Gilgarran Branch
- Cleator and Workington Junction Railway

== Sources ==
- Andrews, Dr Michael (May 2001). Peascod, Michael (ed.). "The Harrington and Lowca Light Railway". Cumbrian Railways. 7 (2). Pinner: Cumbrian Railways Association. ISSN 1466-6812.
- Bradshaw, George (1985) [July 1922]. Bradshaw's General Railway and Steam Navigation guide for Great Britain and Ireland: A reprint of the July 1922 issue. Newton Abbot: David & Charles. ISBN 978-0-7153-8708-5. OCLC 12500436.
- Edgar, Gordon (2016). Industrial Locomotives & Railways of Cumbria. Stroud: Amberley Publishing. ISBN 978-1-4456-4833-0.

== Bibliography ==
- Bairstow, Martin (1995). Railways In The Lake District. Martin Bairstow. ISBN 1-871944-11-2.
- British Railways Pre-Grouping Atlas And Gazetteer. Shepperton: Ian Allan Publishing. 1997 [1958]. ISBN 0-7110-0320-3.
- Croughton, Godfrey; Kidner, Roger W.; Young, Alan (1982). Private and Untimetabled Railway Stations, Halts and Stopping Places X 43. Headington, Oxford: The Oakwood Press. ISBN 0-85361-281-1.
- Haynes, James Allen (April 1920). Cleator & Workington Junction Railway Working Time Table. Central Station, Workington: Cleator and Workington Junction Railway.
- Jowett, Alan (March 1989). Jowett's Railway Atlas of Great Britain and Ireland: From Pre-Grouping to the Present Day (1st ed.). Sparkford: Patrick Stephens Ltd. ISBN 978-1-85260-086-0. OCLC 22311137.
- Joy, David (1983). Lake Counties (Regional History of the Railways of Great Britain). Newton Abbot: David & Charles. ISBN 094653702X.
- Marshall, John (1981). Forgotten Railways: North West England. Newton Abbot: David & Charles. ISBN 0-7153-8003-6.
- McGowan Gradon, W. (2004) [1952]. The Track of the Ironmasters: A History of the Cleator and Workington Junction Railway. Grange-over-Sands: Cumbrian Railways Association. ISBN 0-9540232-2-6.
- Quayle, Howard (2007). Whitehaven: The Railways and Waggonways of a Unique Cumberland Port. Pinner: Cumbrian Railways Association. ISBN 978-0-9540232-5-6.
- Quick, Michael (September 2009). Railway Passenger Stations in Great Britain - a Chronology. Railway & Canal Historical Society. ISBN 978-0-901461-57-5.
- Robinson, Peter W. (2002). Cumbria's Lost Railways. Stenlake Publishing. ISBN 1-84033-205-0.
- Robinson, Peter W. (1985). Railways of Cumbria. Clapham, via Lancaster: Dalesman Books. ISBN 0-85206-815-8.
- Smith, Paul; Turner, Keith (2012). Railway Atlas Then and Now. Ian Allan Publishing. ISBN 978-0-7110-3695-6.
- Suggitt, Gordon (2008). Lost Railways of Cumbria (Railway Series). Newbury: Countryside Books. ISBN 978-1-84674-107-4.
