= Harrington and Lowca Light Railway =

Railway in Cumbria, England

Lowca Light Railway
Overview
- Locale: Cumbria, England
- Dates of operation: 1912–1973
- Predecessor: Mr Curwen's wagonway aka Bain's tramway

Technical
- Track gauge: Standard
- Length: 3 miles 37 chains (5.6 km)

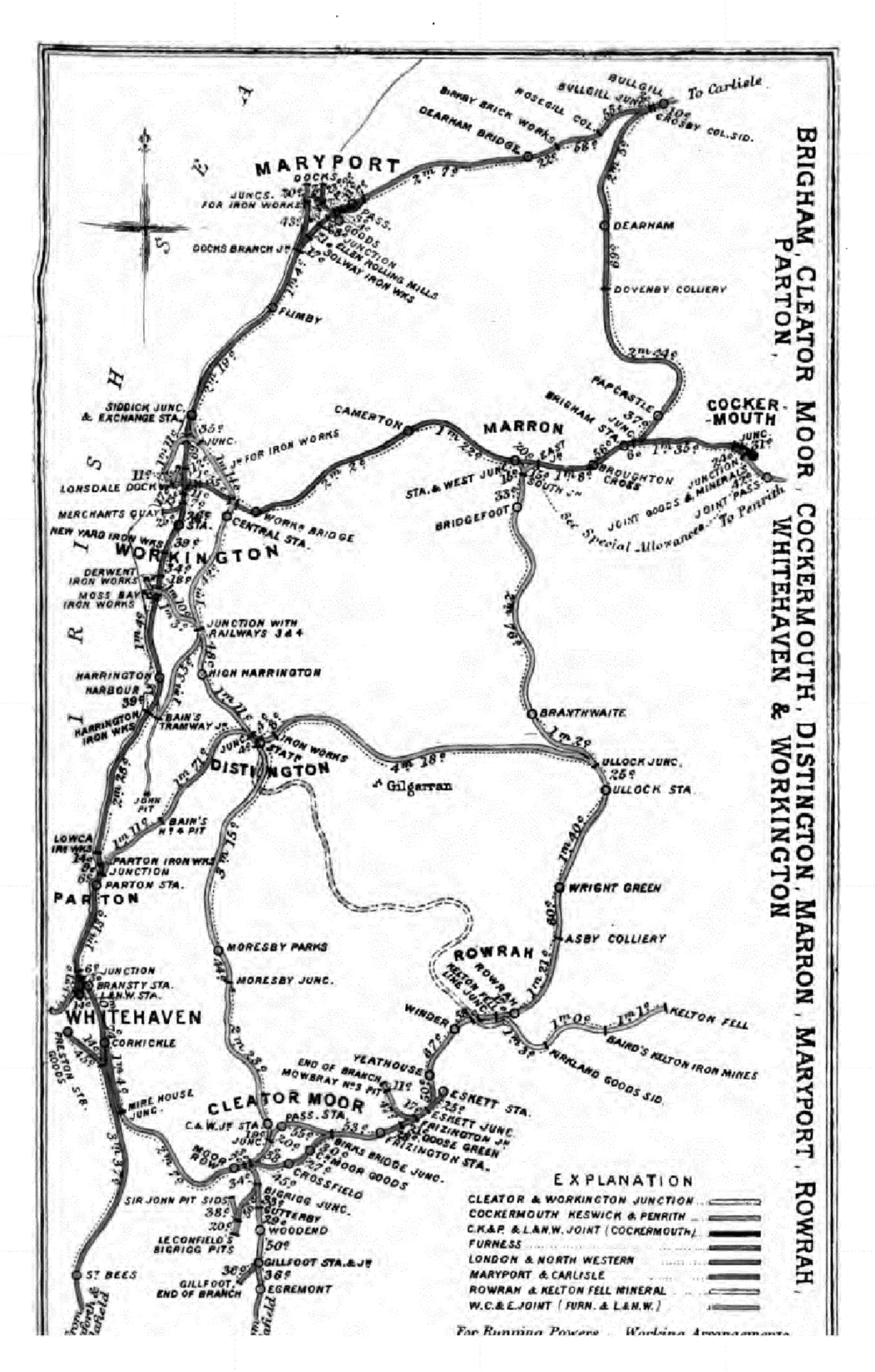
An 1882 Railway Clearing House Junction Diagram showing railways in the area

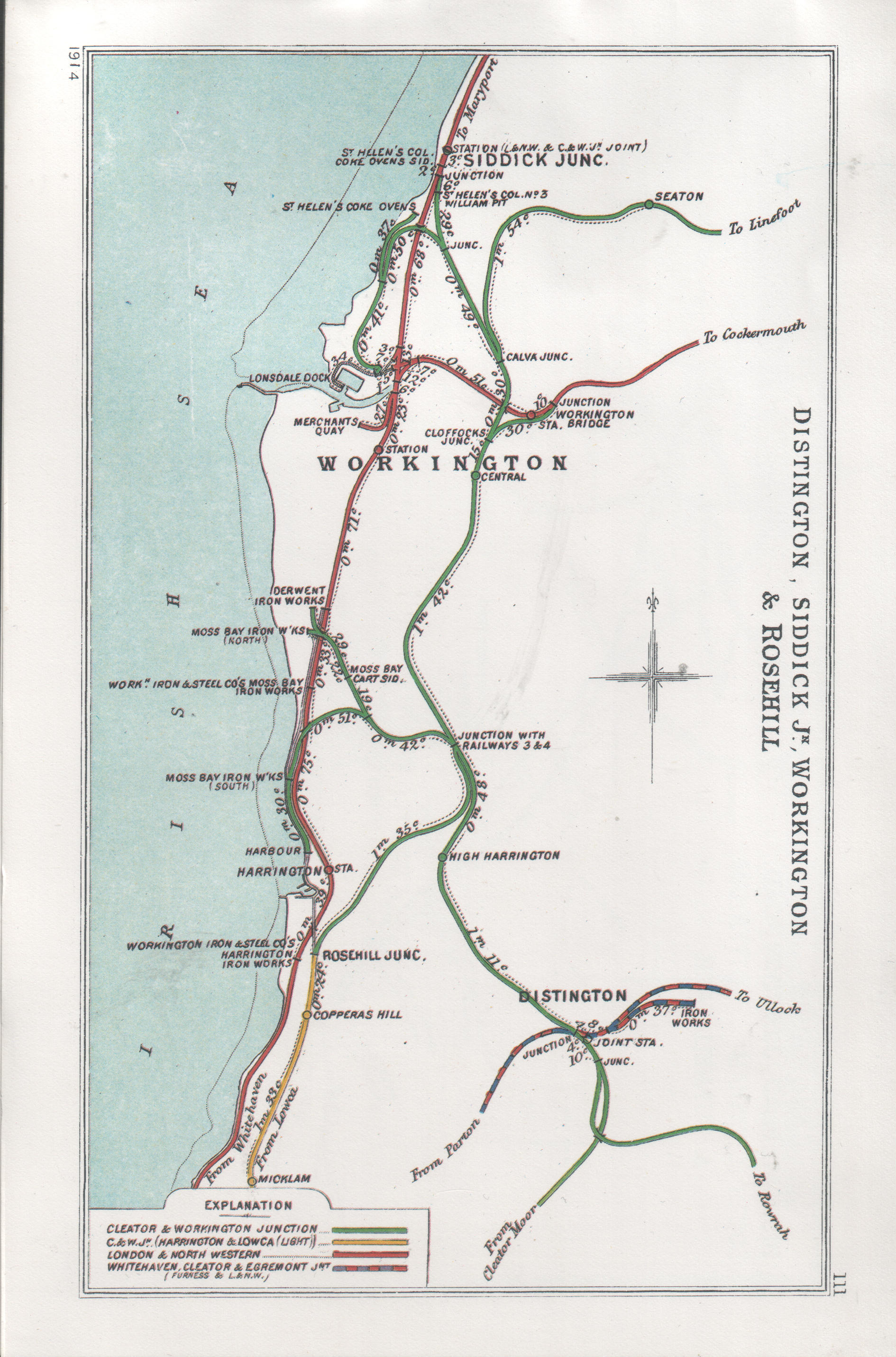
A 1914 Railway Clearing House Junction Diagram showing the complex network which existed in the Workington area

The Harrington and Lowca Light Railway (commonly known as the Lowca Light Railway or LLR) was a short railway on the coast of Cumberland, which is now part of Cumbria, England.

The line was originally an industrial railway, but by the early twentieth century it was carrying passengers in association with the Cleator and Workington Junction Railway (CWJR). This joint venture ended in 1929, and from that year onwards, the line reverted to industrial use. It closed in 1973, having outlived almost all its larger neighbours.

== History ==
The earliest railway near the village of Harrington was a Wagonway at Harrington Harbour, which was probably constructed when improvements were made to the harbour in 1760. In 1844, the Whitehaven Junction Railway was being planned, and Henry Curwen of Workington required the company to build a bridge at Rose Hill to carry "Mr Curwen's waggonway" over the new railway. The wagonway was later leased by James Bain and Partners, owners of the ironworks in Harrington and became known locally and on at least one Railway Clearing House map as "Bains's Tramway".

Bain's Tramway is shown on an 1864 OS map running from Harrington Harbour south along "Rose Hill" past Harrington Parks and a disused chemical works then swinging inland to "John Pit (Coal)" and its neighbour "Hodgson Pit (Coal)". On the map the middle of the word "Reservoirs" would be the site of the future Rosehill Junction and the disused Chemical Works the approximate site of the future Copperas Hill station.

In 1879, the Cleator and Workington Junction Railway opened and built a branch from Harrington Junction which connected with Bain's Tramway at the future Rosehill Junction. Harrington Junction is shown on the 1882 Railway Clearing House map as "Junction with Railways 3 & 4". The map shows the tramway continuing to John Pit and makes no mention of Micklam or Lowca. It also shows Bain's No 4 Pit on the Gilgarran Branch.

A branch to Mossbay in Workington was opened on 19 December 1885, diverging southwest from the Derwent Branch west of Harrington Junction. This gave a second access to Moss Bay Ironworks. In 1893, an extension of the Mossbay Branch was built between the coastal main line and the sea southwards to Harrington Harbour.

The 1900 OS map shows that the final route from Rose Hill Junction had been built. The original tramway running south-southwest to John and Hodgson Pits had been abandoned from a short distance south of Foxpit House, with the new line of route continuing nearer the shoreline to "Micklam Pit", "Harrington Colliery" and then swinging east to "Bain's Siding".

== Expansion at Lowca ==
In 1909 Derwent Ironworks, Moss Bay Hematite Iron and Steel Company, Harrington Ironworks, Harrington Harbour, Harrington Colliery and the mineral line from Harrington Harbour up to Rosehill Junction then on to Micklam and Lowca all became part of the newly formed Workington Iron & Steel Company Ltd (WISC), just as Harrington No. 10 colliery at Lowca was about to come on stream. Geography and commerce then explain the route by which industrial products were moved for the next sixty four years. Two geographical features set the context: cliffs and sea. Lowca and Micklam are on top of cliffs overlooking the sea, with only a narrow sea level strip below them, already fully occupied by the coast line. Traffic between those places and the new company's works, docks and elsewhere in the UK had to climb or descend either very steeply (e.g. the original Rosehill tramway route up from Harrington Harbour) or go circuitously inland. Harrington Harbour was on its last legs. Although it had led the way in the eighteenth century it would have been hopelessly incapable of handling the volume of traffic required at the start of the twentieth; furthermore, it had no room for expansion. WISC had a commercial incentive to operate the lines which had evolved between their core Workington sites and Lowca in that they could avoid costs and risks associated with overdependence on the LNWR and its crowded coastal route.

The 1914 RCH Junction Diagram shown right suggests WISC might have swapped dependence on the LNWR for dependence on the CWJR, as the lines from Moss Bay and Derwent works through Harrington Junction to Rosehill Junction all belonged to the CWJR. Although these lines were the CWJR's, the WISC and its eventual successor the United Steel Company - provided and ran mineral trains, an arrangement which continued until closure in 1973. The company then had two routes from Workington to Lowca - via the coast and via Harrington Junction, without overdependence on either.

== The routes ==
Neither route between Workington and Lowca was simple. The coastal route, used for example by a coal train from Solway Colliery to the washeries at Lowca, involved travelling south to the sidings at Parton, reversing up the 1 in 53 Gilgarran Branch to Bain's Siding then zig-zagging forwards up the valley side to the washery.

A train taking the inland route from Moss Bay Ironworks to Lowca would start southwards towards Harrington Harbour, squeezed between the LNWR line and the sea. The train would join the harbour line and stop; the locomotive would run round and head north, immediately swinging northeast to cross the coastal route by a bowstring girder bridge. The route then described a 180 degree arc so that by Harrington Junction it was heading south again. An easy run past the Glebe Sand Siding to Rosehill Junction meant that the original Mr Curwen's waggonway 1 in 15 climb from Harrington Harbour had been replaced by a much gentler 2 miles 48 chains (4.2 km) loop. There was a sting in the tail, as from Rose Hill Junction the line climbed southwards to Copperas Hill for 13 chains (260 m) at 1 in 17 easing to 1 in 26 for a further 3 chains (60 m) followed by 12 chains (240 m) at a relaxed 1 in 49. Most of the rest of the line along the clifftops was at gradients in double figures.

As older collieries became uneconomic or were worked out, new mines were opened further afield and deeper underground (or undersea, as at Lowca.) The critical ones in this context were Harrington No 9 Pit and Harrington No 10 Pit, both on the clifftop at Lowca. "Harrington" in this context was now doubly confusing as the pits were not in Harrington and the Harrington Colliery Company had ceased trading as an independent entity. The pits came into operation in 1911, along with new coke ovens nearby. This surge in activity and the assured future of Micklam's 1901 fireclay mine and associated brickworks (the output was used extensively to line blast furnaces) led to increased traffic using the mineral line along the clifftops and increased the need for labour in this remote and inaccessible spot.

== Passenger services ==
Sources differ whether the coking works was owned by the Workington Iron and Steel Company (WISC), with technical support from Koppers, whose technology was used, or whether an independent Koppers Coke Ovens Company ran the plant, but in 1910 one or both asked the CWJR to provide workmen's services between Workington and Lowca. The railway company consulted the Board of Trade (BoT) and made some signalling alterations at Harrington Junction as a result of a BoT inspection report on their Harrington Branch (i.e. Harrington Junction to Rosehill Junction) issued by Colonel Druitt on 22 March 1912. They then introduced a workmen's service between Moss Bay Cart Siding and Lowca on 15 April 1912. The service used WISC locomotives and rolling stock and was later transferred to run from Workington Central.

Details of the workmen's service are sketchy. A letter from WISC's parliamentary agent to the BoT on 2 December 1912 stated "..the line is being used [...] for the purpose of conveying workmen between Harrington and the works of the Promoters..." A photograph taken of the first public train on 2 June 1913 shows it at the workmen's platform at Lowca, the public platform yet not being ready. Standard works, notably Quick and Butt, make no mention of services at Lowca before 2 June 1913, nor at Micklam or Copperas Hill. They also give Rosehill (Archer Street Halt) as opening on 2 June 1913. This suggests that the workmen's service called at Moss Bay Cart Siding/Workington Central, Rose Hill Platform and Lowca Workmen's Platform. The mention of "...conveying workmen between Harrington and the works..." and entries in Croughton and Quick give tentative support to the Rose Hill Platform (aka Junction) call. Ex-employees writing later state "Miners' trains went up the private railway from Rosehill Box, where Pat McGuire, the "singing signalman" operated." Some later authors appear to conflate Rosehill Platform (aka Rose Hill Platform) and Archer St Halt.

Given the success of the workmen's service the WISC, in co-operation with the CWJR, decided to introduce a publicly advertised passenger service over the same route, which would effectively "upgrade" the workmen's service. Then, as now, the procedure to introduce such a service was costly, slow and fraught with pitfalls. However, the Light Railways Act 1896 had made it possible to open a "light railway" with many fewer hurdles to cross. Such lines were restricted to 25 mph and 8 tons axleweight, thereby presenting fewer hazards to all concerned. The process of seeking a light railway order did not involve an act of Parliament with attendant costs and delays. Step one was to publish a local press "notice", to which interested parties could respond, this was done on 22 May 1912, setting out the case for a "Harrington and Lowca Light Railway." This led to a public meeting in Workington on 20 July 1912 at which the LNWR objected to the service on the grounds that it would be a competing line. They subsequently accepted that it would not and withdrew their opposition.

At this point bureaucracy took over, with the Board of Trade's Railway Department going through the necessary processes with the WISC and CWJR. Colonel Druitt reported on the Rosehill Junction to Lowca line on 8 May 1913 taking what must have been one of the last steps in the approval process, because the Harrington and Lowca Light Railway Order 1913 sanctioning the Harrington and Lowca Light Railway was signed eight days later on 16 May 1913 and services began a fortnight after that on 2 June 1913, with the inaugural train posing with mineworkers of both sexes, akin to the Pit Brow Lasses of the Wigan coalfield.

Quite apart from its fearsome inclines the Harrington and Lowca Light Railway was unusual. It appears to have been a form of licence for trains to run along a stretch of track rather than a company owning track and rolling stock and running trains. Railway Clearing House maps of the route shows the Lowca to Rosehill Junction section in one colour and the Rosehill Junction to Harrington Junction section coloured as part of the CWJR. CWJR Working Time Tables refer to the "Lowca Branch" and list signalboxes at Rosehill Junction and Lowca as their own. An elegant summary was "An unusual feature of the H&LLR was that it was owned by the Curwens, leased by the W. I. & S. Co., staffed by the C&WJR and operated by Furness Railway rolling stock and locomotives." Passenger trains were operated by Furness rolling stock, but all internal WISC traffic over the LLR and over CWJR metals to Moss Bay and Derwent ironworks was handled by WISC using their own locos and wagons, an arrangement which survived until closure in 1973. Separate permission to run public passenger trains from Harrington Junction to Workington Central was not needed as that was part of the CWJR proper.

The timetable from 1 July 1913 shows four Down (southbound) and balancing Up trains, Monday to Saturday, three of which ran at different times on Saturdays to cover different shift patterns; two trains ran northwards beyond Workington to Seaton. Rosehill (Archer Street Halt), Copperas Hill and Micklam appear, but not Rosehill Junction or Harrington (Church Road Halt). The former seems to have been abandoned with the opening of a "proper" station at Archer Street, approximately 250 yards to the north. The latter opened either by September or November 1913. A footnote on the timetable reads "Mineral Trains to Derwent Works and Harrington Harbour, and vice versa, will run as required." Indicating that the incline from Rose Hill Junction down to Harrington Harbour was still available for traffic; it was not formally closed until 1952.

Miners' trains "...were old wooden six-wheelers with wooden seats [..] The compartments were extremely narrow and stank to high heaven of coal dust and 'Tom Twist' an almost lethal tobacco beloved by the colliers both for smoking and chewing." These trains were "upgraded" to public passenger status by adding an extra composite coach, complete with First Class compartment and lavatory.

Exceptional demand and suppressed imports during the First World War gave a stay of execution to much of Cumberland's iron and steel making industry and associated railways, the LLR included. The CWJR did not provide Sunday services, so the WISC ran two workmen's trains, Sundays Only, between Moss Bay Cart Siding and Lowca from 11 July 1915. In addition a workmen's train from Maryport to Lowca was run from September 1915 "for the duration".

The 1919 CWJR timetable shows that Lowca services beyond Workington to Seaton aimed at shift workers had ended, with Seaton's few trains being aimed at a different clientele, referred to formally in the 1920 Working Time Table as "Market Passenger". In both years one service in each direction ran straight through Micklam and Copperas Hill non-stop.

With war ended the commercial realities of technological change in steelmaking, exhausting local supplies of raw materials and foreign competition came back to the fore. WISC was merged with other concerns to become part of the United Steel Company (USC), a classic prelude to rationalisation. The CWJR was a private company with shareholders, like any other. The USC offered 70% of the shares' value, which was almost entirely taken up, making the company and its lines part of the USC. The LLR remained owned by the Curwens, becoming leased by the USC instead of the WISC. No evidence has yet been published that this had significant short-term impact on either the LLR or the CWJR. In any event, the latter became part of the LMSR at the Grouping in 1923.

In 1921 Copperas Hill disappeared from the timetable altogether. The July 1922 Bradshaw lists Seaton, but shows no services, having ended in February. The Workington-Lowca rump shows three trains a day, with an extra on Saturdays.

In early LMSR days the passenger trains were changed to "Bus Trains", with a travelling ticket collector along modern lines. This economy measure does not seem to have gone the whole hog towards fully unstaffed stations, but was a step in that direction, encouraged by the rapid growth of local road bus competition. The service - known locally as "The Rattler" - may have had a precarious future, but it was dealt a body blow by the General Strike which started on 3 May 1926. Railwaymen went back to work after several days, but miners stayed out a lot longer. The service was suspended "for the duration" and never returned, being formally withdrawn from 31 May 1926.

The workmen's service did resume after the miners went back to work, but local bus services had seized their chances and made inroads into the market, based on very competitive pricing and an often better product; a bus which stopped near the end of your street was better than a half mile walk to and from Workington Central to add to an exhausting working day. Cumberland Motor Services' had six buses in 1921 and sixty in 1926, it also opened the first bus station in the UK in Workington in March 1926. The workmen's service was withdrawn on 1 April 1929.

Most conventional railways provided parcels and goods services, which usually soldiered on after closure of passenger services, often for many years. These never existed on the LLR, so closure to workmen's trains enabled the USC and LMSR to make significant immediate savings by removing signalling and associated staff and infrastructure not needed for a purely mineral line. The stations were closed, some were demolished, but the station building at Copperas Hill, the first to close back in 1921, was still in good shape in 1969.

== Back to industrial use ==
The post-war period was very difficult for West Cumberland, but Lowca was something of an exception in that the United Coke and Chemicals Company by-products plant was built there in 1923 to refine tars produced by the coking plants in the Workington area, as well as the coke ovens in Lowca itself. Many photos of traffic on the line right up to closure include tar wagons which would typically travel up to Lowca loaded. The plant finally closed in 1978, five years after the LLR.

This bright spot was set in a sea of rationalisation and decline. Distington Ironworks closed in the early 1920s, Harrington Ironworks by the early 1930s and Harrington Harbour was closed to shipping in 1928, with the branch from Moss Bay falling into disuse to match. The line down Rose Hill was nominally open until 1952, but scarcely used. The CWJR lost its passenger traffic as early as 1931, with the Gilgarran branch severed both east and west of Distington. The former WCER lines lost most of their passenger services in 1931 with the rest going in 1935.

The LLR, however, continued to meet need:

- Harrington No 10 and Bain's No 4 pit produced good coal in good quantities at competitive cost.
- Micklam brickworks produced good firebricks, essential for the remaining steelworks
- Lowca bi-products plant turned waste products of the coking process into sellable goods

In essence this remained the situation into the 1960s. Surrounding lines and industries continued to be nibbled away, but Lowca met need and the LLR made that possible. The nationalisation of railways and coal in the 1940s had little impact on the LLR. The line continued to be worked by the USC, with NCB locos at Lowca itself. In 1950 two 0-6-0ST locomotives were bought new by the USC and formed the line's staple motive power until dieselisation in 1965. After this point the line's staple motive power was Yorkshire Engine Company 0-4-0 diesel electrics, typically paired back-to-back. Harrington No. 10 Pit at Lowca remained steam-worked until it closed in 1968, with a fleet of "Austerity" 0-6-0STs. These worked the pit environs and took incoming coal from British Railways' locomotives on the zig-zag at Bain's Siding and returned empties there for BR to take away to Solway Colliery, Workington for refilling.

The line's future was called into question in 1968 when Harrington No. 10 Colliery closed, but as coal was still being wound at Solway Colliery in Workington it continued to be sent to Lowca for washing and coking; this was the line's last thread. When the pit shut in May 1973 the LLR had no further purpose and closed. On 26 May 1973 the last train of all had an extra guards van carrying members of the Borders Railway Society. It retrieved tar wagons "stranded" at Lowca and returned them and the guards vans to Moss Bay.

== Enthusiasts' specials ==
The line was situated in an isolated part of an isolated part of England. Nevertheless, its late survival and extraordinary gradients attracted considerable interest. At least five railtours traversed the route, with participants riding in guards vans, these were on 2 March 1968 and 26 May 1969, with three organised by the Border Railway Society, one in 1967, the Last Day described above and at least one between.

== Demolition and afterlife ==
LLR tracks were lifted by the end of 1973. Stretches along the clifftops between Rose Hill and Lowca have become part of the Cumbria Coastal Way.

== See also ==
- Gilgarran Branch
