= Moss Bay Hematite Iron and Steel Company =

The Moss Bay Hematite Iron Company was founded and owned by Charles James Valentine, in 1876 and was situated on the coast at Mossbay, Workington, Cumberland.

The Moss Bay Hematite Iron Company became the Moss Bay Hematite Iron and Steel Company in 1881.

This company was liquidated in 1890 and reformed in 1891.

In 1909 it was amalgamated with other West Cumberland firms as part of the Workington Iron and Steel Company.

== Transport ==
The works had North and South sidings connecting them to the local rail infrastructure and mines. Both the North and South sidings connected with the Cleator and Workington Junction Railway at Harrington Junction.

== Sources ==
- Baggley, Phil (c. 2005), Moss Bay Hematite Iron Company: A look at the early history of the Moss Bay Iron works
- Ely, Arline (1975), Our Foundering Fathers (PDF), Kirkland Public Library
