= Harrington Junction =

Disused railway station in Cumbria, England

Coordinates: 54°37′23″N 3°32′57″W

Harrington Junction was a railway junction in Harrington, Cumbria, England. It joined three branches to the Cleator and Workington Junction Railway's (CWJR) main line from Workington Central to Moor Row via Cleator Moor West. No station ever existed at the junction, High Harrington was the nearest, 48 chains (0.97 km) to the south.

Former employees described the junction as the CWJR's "nerve centre".

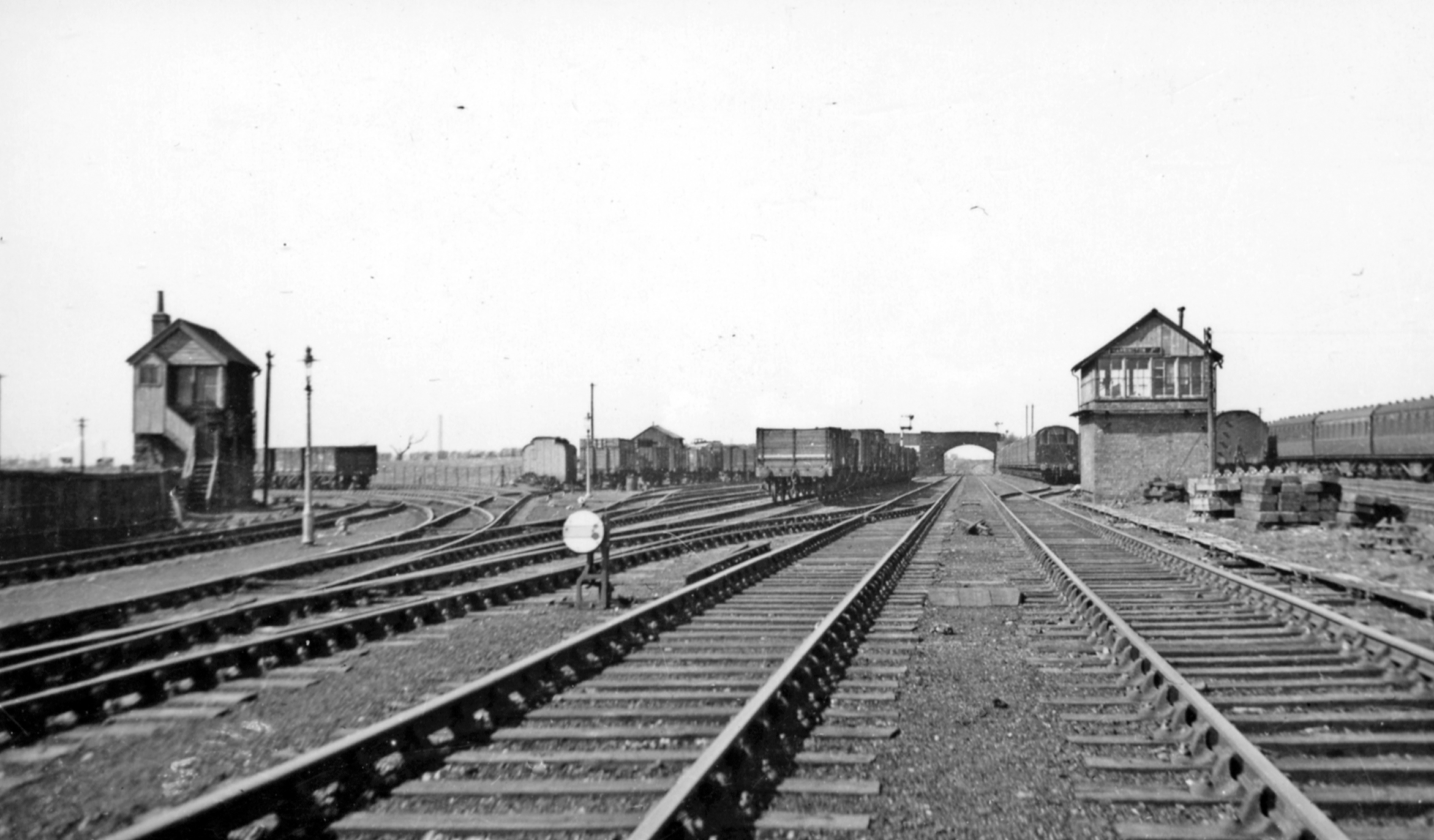
Harrington Junction looking north in 1951

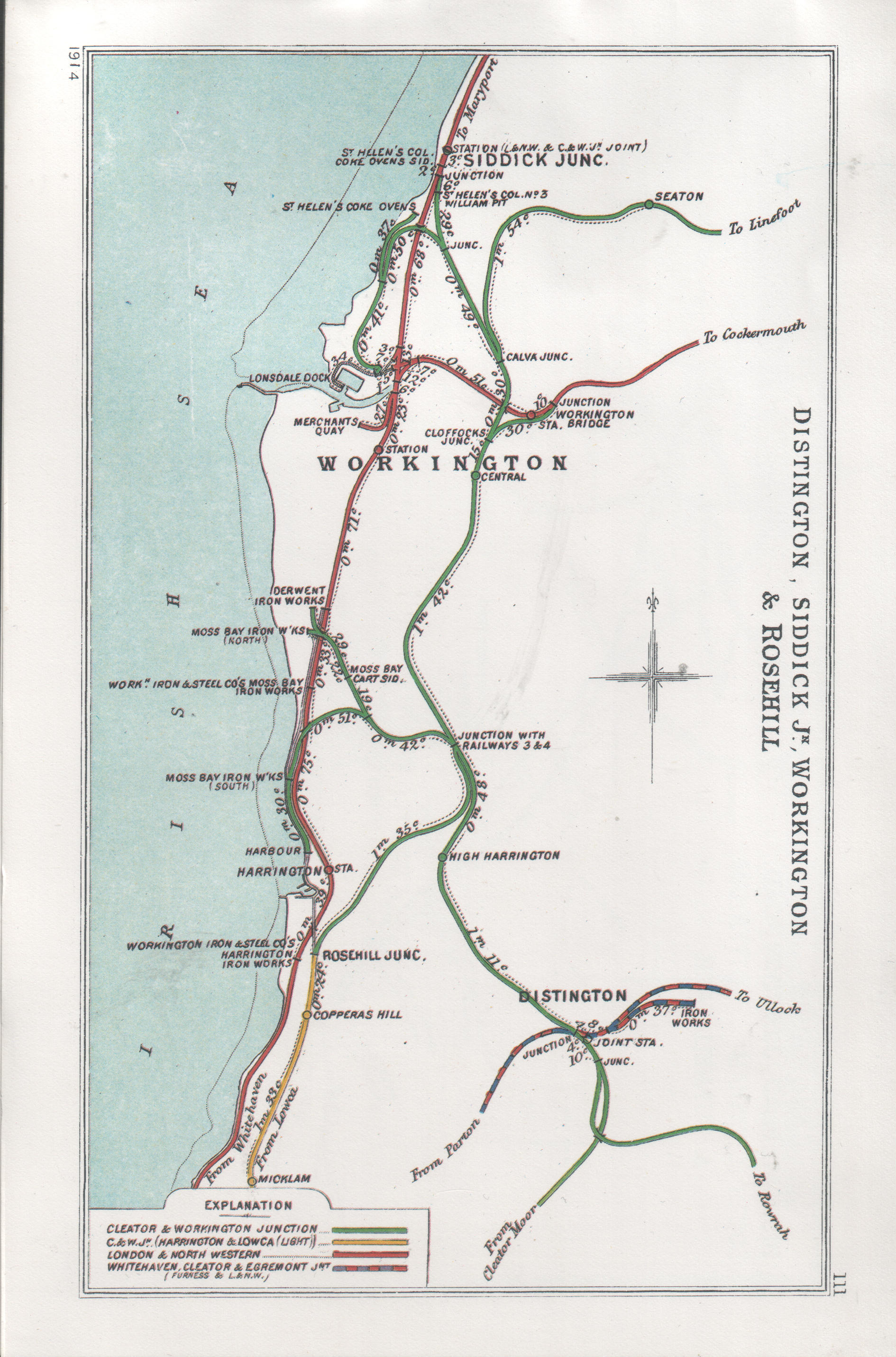
A 1914 Railway Clearing House Junction Diagram showing the complex network which existed in the Workington area

== Background ==
The main line was one of the fruits of the rapid industrialisation of West Cumberland in the second half of the nineteenth century, specifically being born as a reaction to oligopolistic behaviour by the London and North Western and Whitehaven, Cleator and Egremont Railways.

All lines in the area were primarily aimed at mineral traffic, notably iron ore, coal and limestone, none more so than the new line to Workington, which earned the local name "The Track of the Ironmasters". General goods and passenger services were provided, but were very small beer compared with mineral traffic.

The founding Act of Parliament of June 1878 confirmed the company's agreement with the Furness Railway that the latter would operate the line for one third of the receipts.

== Layout ==
Three lines joined the main line at Harrington Junction:

- the Derwent Branch, from Derwent Iron and Steel Works north west of the junction
- the Moss Bay Branch, from the Moss Bay Hematite Iron and Steel Company Works west of the junction, and
- the Harrington Branch, which met the Lowca Light Railway at Rosehill, south west of the junction.

The layout was such that trains could travel from the Harrington Branch onto the Moss Bay Branch or the Derwent Branch without going onto the main line.

There were five sidings on each side of the main line, four beside the lines to the steel works and a further four beside the Lowca line, together with other equipment such as cranes, signalboxes and a control cabin.

== Growth ==
Mineral traffic started along the main line in July 1879, along with the branches towards Lowca and Derwent Ironworks. The Moss Bay branch followed in December 1885, being extended to Harrington Harbour in July 1893.

Harrington Junction was about mineral and industrial traffic. The line's peak year was 1909, with lots of traffic generated between 1914 and 1918.

In 1920 twenty "Up" (northbound) mineral trains halted at the junction, plus passenger, workmen's, goods, and special trains. A similar number travelled southbound.

== Decline ==
Passenger traffic to and from Lowca ended in May 1926 and along the main line on 13 April 1931, though they had never been substantial.

The last remnant of the Derwent branch, from Wilkinson Wagon Works to the junction, closed in 1962.

The line south from Distington to Cleator Moor West closed on 16 September 1963 and the line from the junction south to Distington was singled.

The remaining main line from Calva Junction north of Workington Central through the junction to Distington closed on 26 September 1965, but residual traffic continued between Lowca and Moss Bay, keeping a bit of the junction alive.

The "Furnessman" brakevan railtour on 24 May 1969 passed through the remains of the junction.

Solway Colliery, Workington, closed in May 1973, leaving the junction with no traffic or prospect of traffic, so it closed on 23 May, with a farewell brakevan special on 26 May 1973 being the last train for ever.

== Afterlife ==
In 2013 the West Cumbria Cycle Network used the main line trackbed through the junction.

== See also ==
- Maryport and Carlisle Railway
- Furness Railway
- Whitehaven, Cleator and Egremont Railway
- Cockermouth and Workington Railway
