= Lowca =

Village and civil parish in Cumbria, England

Coordinates: 54.583°N 3.583°W

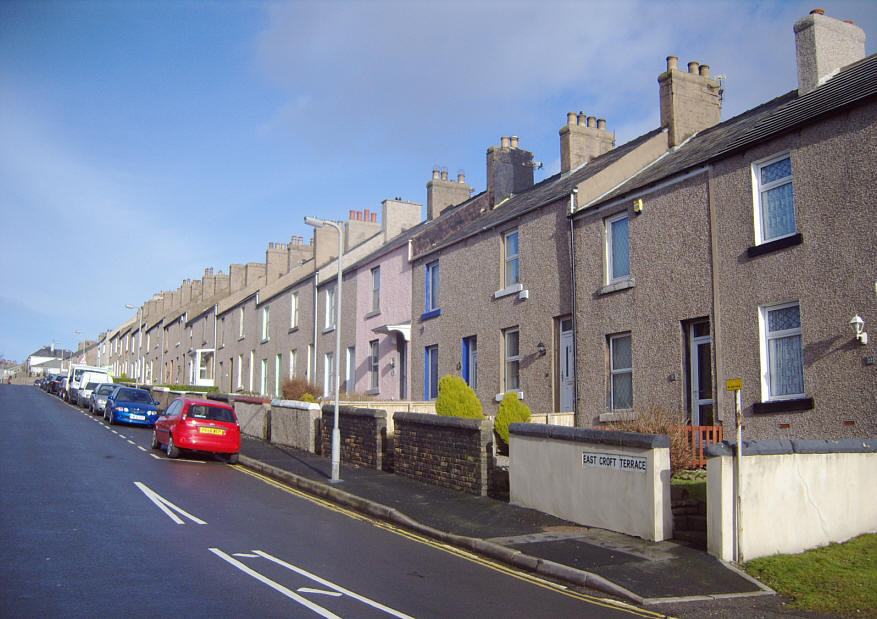
- The main street of Lowca village

- Location in Copeland Borough Location within Cumbria
- Population: 888 (2011)
- OS grid reference: NX976220
- Civil parish: Lowca
- Unitary authority: Cumberland
- Ceremonial county: Cumbria
- Region: North West
- Country: England
- Sovereign state: United Kingdom
- Post town: WHITEHAVEN
- Postcode district: CA28
- Dialling code: 01946
- Police: Cumbria
- Fire: Cumbria
- Ambulance: North West
- UK Parliament: Whitehaven and Workington

Lowca is a village and civil parish in the English county of Cumbria, just to the north of the village of Moresby. It had a population of 773 in 2001, increasing to 888 at the 2011 Census.

It was formerly a mining area but is now noted for its wind farm.

Lowca looks out over the Solway Firth to the west. The village used to stand next to a huge black slag heap called Pit Bank until the slag heap was redeveloped in the 1980s, along with a new road leading directly through Lowca from the A595.

Lowca has its own community school, previously known as Lowca Primary School, and rugby team.

== History ==
In 1800, brothers Adam, Thomas and Crosby Heslop, formerly associated with the ironworks at Seaton near Workington, established an iron foundry and engineering business on the seashore by the mouth of the Lowca Beck. The impetus for the business was probably the success of the twin-cylinder steam engine Adam had invented while working in Shropshire in 1790, and there was no shortage of finance, hence the company title "Heslops, Milward, Johnston & Co." The three brothers were all dead by the mid-1830s so the investors sold up, and the works was taken over by local iron mining partnership Tulk and Ley which began a long tradition of locomotive manufacture. In 1857 it was sold again, to Fletcher, Jennings & Co.

Lowca also had large reserves of coal, which were mined for centuries, providing even more employment than the engineering works. In 1911 a chemical works was established to exploit the latest coal by-product technologies which had been developed in Germany. This plant was shelled by a German submarine, U-24, during World War I, on 16 August 1915; an event which the Germans made much of at the time, and Lowca has made much of ever since. Local legend has it that a quick thinking local worker opened a relief valve which sent up an impressive plume of burning gas, so the submariners thought they had destroyed their target and left. Apparently the only fatality of the incident was one local dog.

The village used to be served by Lowca railway station on the Lowca Light Railway which connected with the Cleator & Workington junction railway at Harrington Junction.
