= Harrington, Cumbria =

Village in Cumbria, England

Coordinates: 54.612°N 3.565°W

Harrington
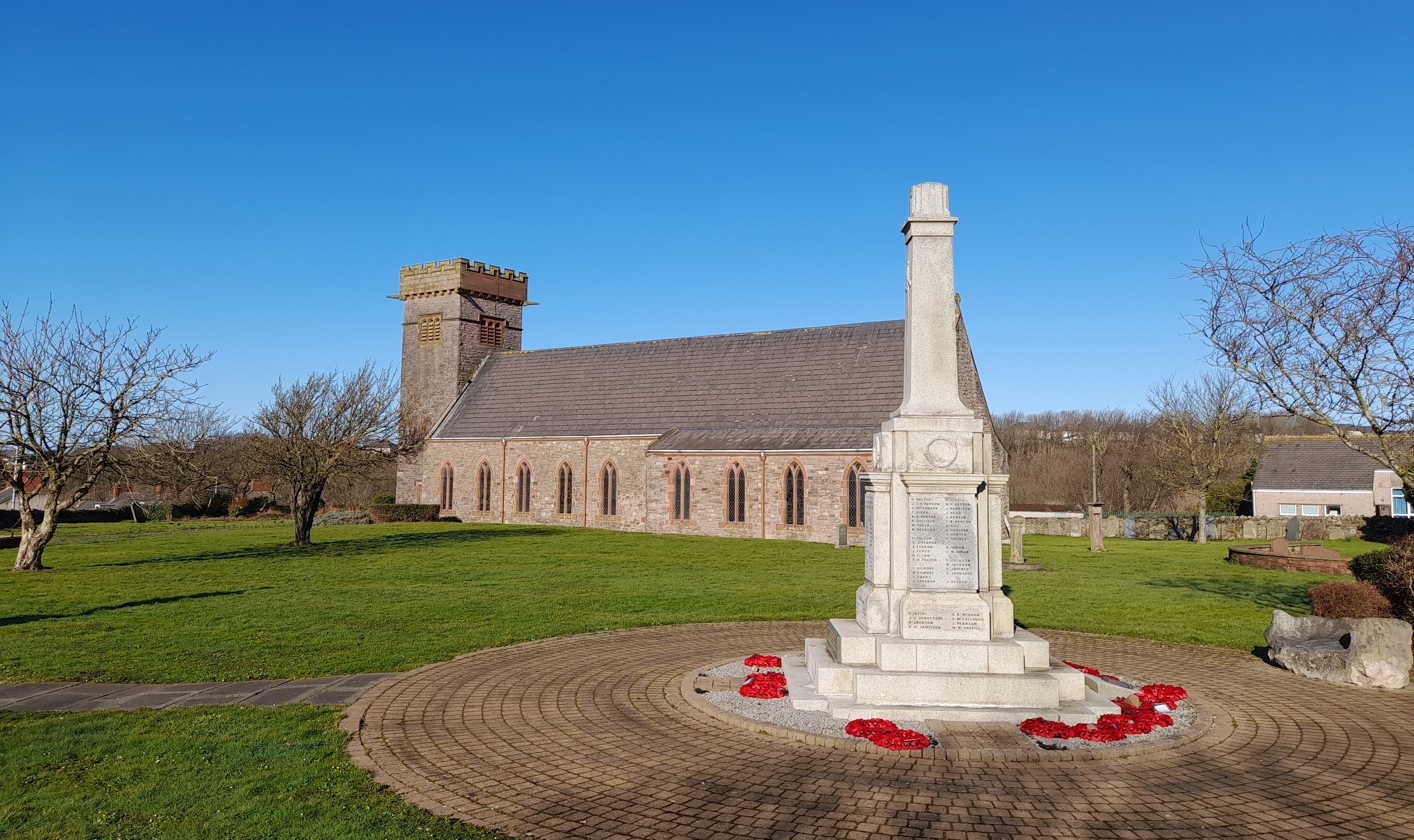
- St Mary's Church and War Memorial

- Location within Cumbria
- OS grid reference: NX985255
- Civil parish: Workington
- Unitary authority: Cumberland
- Ceremonial county: Cumbria
- Region: North West
- Country: England
- Sovereign state: United Kingdom
- Post town: WORKINGTON
- Postcode district: CA14
- Dialling code: 01946
- Police: Cumbria
- Fire: Cumbria
- Ambulance: North West
- UK Parliament: Whitehaven and Workington

Harrington is a suburban village on the southern outskirts of Workington, in the Cumberland district of Cumbria, England. It was formerly a separate village and parish; it has been administered as part of Workington since 1934, and is now classed as part of the Workington built up area. It lies on the coast and has a small harbour. Harrington railway station is on the Cumbrian Coast Line.

In the late 18th century, the old village of Harrington, which stood a little way inland from the coast, was expanded into a planned town around a new harbour built to serve the local coal mines. Through the 19th century and into the 20th century, industries in Harrington included iron works, shipbuilding and chemical works. The major heavy industries had closed by the mid 20th century. Much of the 18th century planned town was demolished in slum clearance schemes in the 1960s, and the site is now public open space south of the harbour. Harrington today is in two main parts: the main part lies on the inland side of the coastal railway, and High Harrington is further inland to the east.

The old parish of Harrington also included a rural area to the south, which became the separate parish of Lowca in 1934 when the rest of Harrington was absorbed into Workington. Harrington today gives its name to an electoral ward, which covers a different area to the old parish. The ward additionally includes Salterbeck and Winscales, which were historically part of Workington parish.

== Toponymy ==
The name Harrington is derived from the Old English name Hæfar, combined with ingas (people) and ton (settlement/estate/enclosure). It therefore indicates the settlement of Hæfer's people. Other local place names with similar origins include Workington, Distington and Frizington.

== History ==
The earliest documentary evidence for Harrington dates from the 12th century. It remained a small village until the 18th century, with the main settlement stretching eastwards from the medieval parish church (which was rebuilt in 1885) up to High Harrington. Although near the sea, Harrington was primarily a farming village rather than a port until the 18th century.

The small River Wyre meets the sea a short distance south of Harrington church. This area was historically known as Harrington Beckfoot. By the mid-18th century, a number of coal mines had been established around Harrington. Henry Curwen of Workington Hall owned the collieries and was also lord of the manor of both Harrington and neighbouring Workington. With some of his collieries being closer to Harrington Beckfoot than the existing port at Workington, Curwen commissioned a new harbour at Harrington, which was built in the late 1750s and early 1760s. A planned town to house workers at the port and in the nearby collieries was subsequently laid out in the late 18th century, primarily on the land south of the harbour. Henry Curwen died in 1778 and his estates were inherited by his daughter Isabella. She married John Christian in 1782 (who also owned other collieries nearby), and he was subsequently responsible for much of the new town's development. The new town was initially known as Harrington Harbour or Bella Port (after Isabella), before becoming known simply as Harrington. By the early 19th century, Harrington had grown to be Cumberland's fourth largest port.

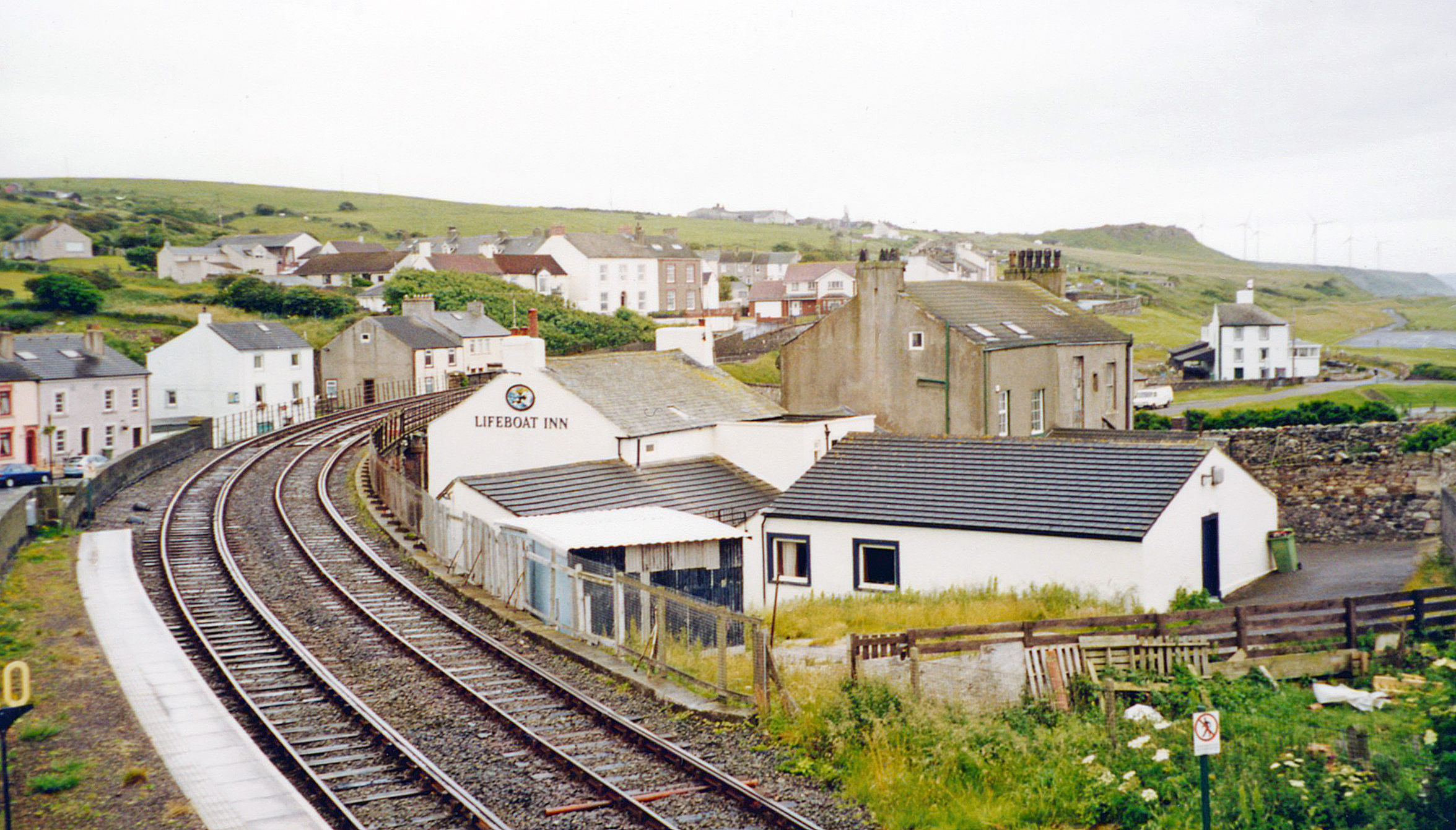
View over Harrington looking south from the platform at Harrington railway station

Harrington railway station opened in 1846 on the Whitehaven Junction Railway, which linked the earlier Maryport and Carlisle Railway with Workington and Whitehaven via Harrington. Other railways followed, which were primarily built to cater for goods traffic associated with the area's mines and industry, although did also run passenger services. The Cleator and Workington Junction Railway opened in 1879 with a station at High Harrington, and the Lowca Light Railway opened in 1913, with a number of small halts in the Harrington area.

In the 19th century, there was further development beyond the area of the planned town, extending along Church Road, which linked the planned town back to the older village and parish church and the main road into Workington. The town developed a number of industries, including iron works, shipbuilding, a chemical works and a brewery. From the late 19th century, the town's industries went into decline. The harbour silted up and had ceased to operate by the 1930s.

In 1940, during the Second World War, a secret magnesite plant was established by the Ministry of Aircraft Production to extract magnesium from seawater, for use in aircraft components and incendiary bombs. The harbour was sealed off and used as a saltwater reservoir for the plant.

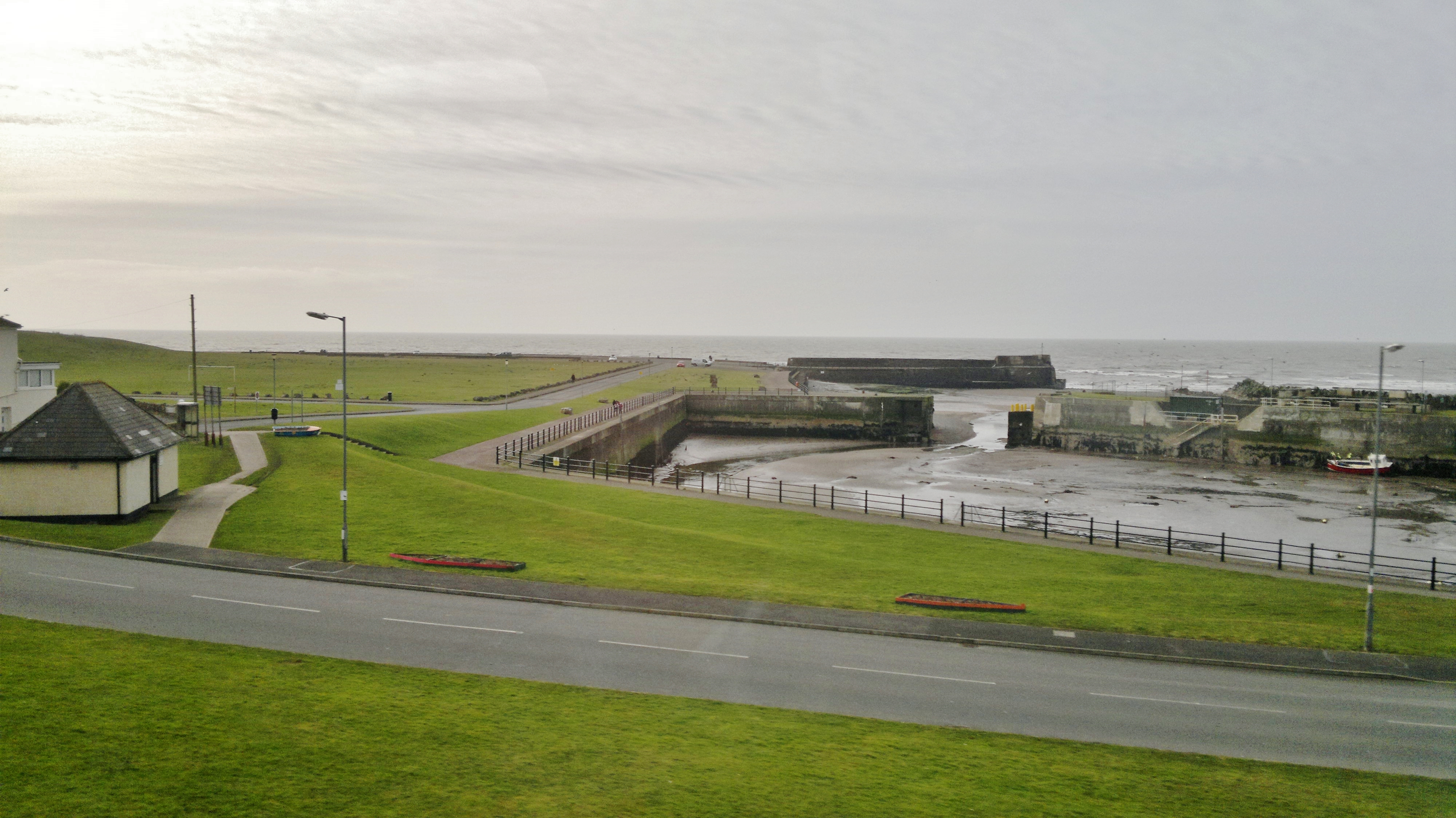
Harrington Harbour, with the grassed area to the left being the cleared site of the 18th century town

The magnesite plant closed in 1953. With the loss of its heavy industries and harbour, the town had little economic rationale, and the core of the 18th century planned town south of the harbour was demolished in slum clearance schemes in the early 1960s and its site laid out as public open space.

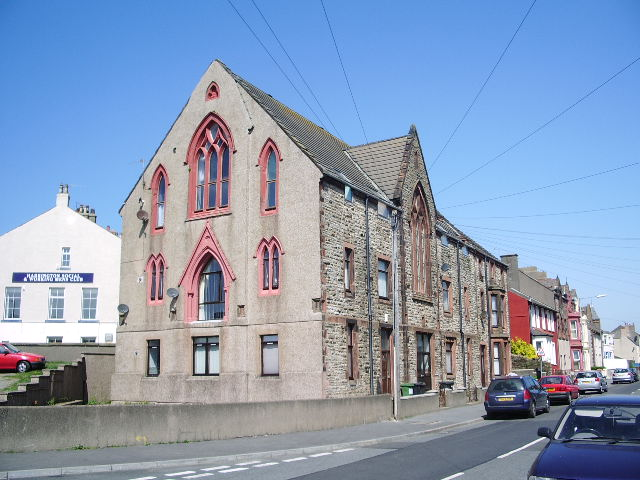
Former Wesleyan Methodist Church and adjoining buildings on Church Road

Following the demolition of the 18th century planned town, the main part of Harrington today is centred on the area between Harrington railway station and the parish church of St Mary's, with Church Road being the main street. The harbour was subsequently reopened and is now used primarily for smaller leisure boats.

Harrington is now classed as part of the Workington built up area by the Office for National Statistics. High Harrington is classed as a separate built up area, which had an estimated population of 1,567 in 2022.

== Governance ==
Harrington forms part of the civil parish of Workington. There are two tiers of local government covering Workington, at parish (town) and unitary authority level: Workington Town Council and Cumberland Council. One of the wards used for elections to Cumberland Council is called Harrington and covers Harrington and High Harrington, as well as Salterbeck and Winscales. For elections to the UK parliament, Harrington forms part of the Whitehaven and Workington constituency.

=== Administrative history ===
Harrington was an ancient parish in the historic county of Cumberland. In 1891, the parish was made a local government district, administered by an elected local board. Such districts were converted into urban districts under the Local Government Act 1894.

Harrington Urban District was abolished in 1934. The more built up northern part of the parish, including the settlement itself, was incorporated into the municipal borough of Workington. The more rural southern part was made a separate parish called Lowca, which formed part of the Ennerdale Rural District. A reduced civil parish of Harrington continued to exist after the 1934 reforms, covering the part of the old parish which had been incorporated into the borough of Workington, but as an urban parish it had no separate council. In 1951, the parish had a population of 2,303.

The borough of Workington and its constituent parishes, including Harrington, were abolished in 1974 under the Local Government Act 1972. The area became part of the borough of Allerdale in the new county of Cumbria. The area of the pre-1974 borough of Workington was an unparished area from 1974 until 1982, when a new civil parish of Workington matching the whole area of the pre-1974 borough (including Harrington) was created, with its parish council taking the name Workington Town Council. Allerdale was abolished in 2023 when the new Cumberland Council was created, also taking over the functions of the abolished Cumbria County Council in the area.

== Churches ==
Harrington had many churches, and four remain as churches today. At St Mary's Church there are recent stained-glass windows, which show much of the industrial and maritime heritage of the area. There is also the Roman Catholic St Mary's Church that was founded by Benedictine monks, which was built in 1893 by Charles Walker of Newcastle, cost £23,000 and funded by public subscription.

== Cycling ==
The West Cumbria Cycle Network passes through Harrington on its way from Distington to Workington. It uses the route of the former Cleator and Workington Junction Railway through High Harrington railway station.

The opening stage of the Tour of Britain Women's cycle race passed through High Harrington in 2026.
