= Parton railway station =

Railway station in Cumbria, England

Parton
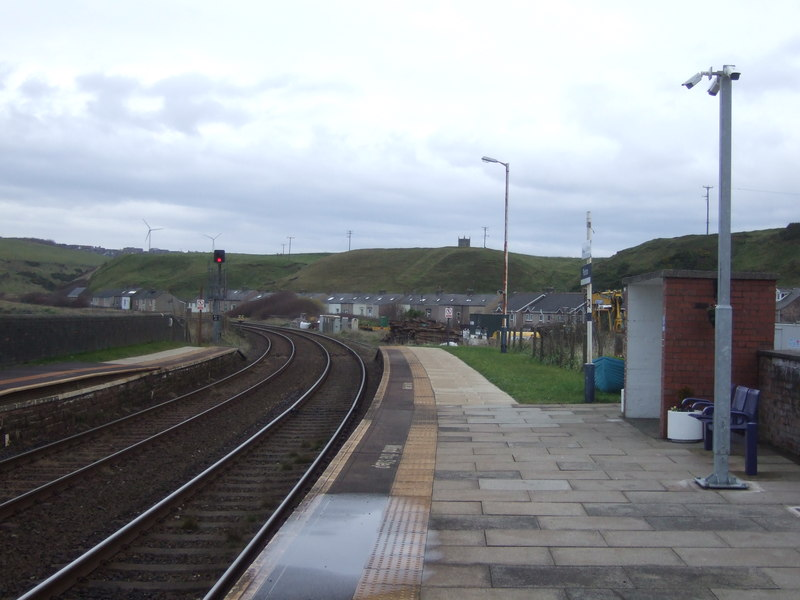

General information
- Location: Parton, Cumberland; England
- Coordinates: 54°34′14″N 3°34′50″W
- Grid reference: NX979206
- Owner: Network Rail
- Manager: Northern Trains
- Platforms: 2
- Tracks: 2

Other information
- Station code: PRN
- Classification: DfT category F2

History
- Original company: Whitehaven Junction Railway
- Pre-grouping: London and North Western Railway
- Post-grouping: London, Midland and Scottish Railway; British Rail (London Midland Region)

Key dates
- 19 March 1847: Opened

Passengers
- 2021/22: ▲6,730
- 2022/23: ▲8,202
- 2023/24: ▲8,450
- 2024/25: ▲12,556
- 2025/26: ▼11,360
Location
- Location within the former Borough of Copeland Location within Cumbria
Notes
- Passenger statistics from the Office of Rail and Road

Parton railway station is a railway station serving the village of Parton in Cumbria, England. It is on the Cumbrian Coast Line, which runs between Carlisle and Barrow-in-Furness. It is owned by Network Rail and managed by Northern Trains.

Immediately north and south of Parton, the line runs almost on the seashore, at the foot of cliffs which require supervision and occasional stabilisation to prevent landslides. Sea erosion is also a danger, and 15 m.p.h speed restrictions are in force over much of the section between here and Harrington, which is restricted to a single line.

There was a signal box immediately to the north of the station that formerly controlled this section, but this was closed and demolished due to its deteriorating condition in May 2010 (control passing to the adjacent box at Whitehaven Bransty).

== Facilities ==
There are no permanent buildings here other than brick shelters on each platform. The station is not staffed and anyone wishing to travel must buy their ticket on the train or in advance, as no ticket machine is available. Train running information is provided by telephone, digital CIS screens and timetable posters. No step-free access is available to either platform.

== Services ==
There is generally an hourly service northbound to Carlisle and southbound to Whitehaven with most trains going onward to Barrow-in-Furness (no late evening service operates south of Whitehaven). A few through trains operate to/from Lancaster via the Furness Line.

Train operator Northern introduced a regular through service to Barrow via the coast at the May 2018 timetable change, the first such service south of Whitehaven for more than 40 years. Services run approximately hourly from mid-morning until early evening, with later trains terminating at Whitehaven. This represents a major upgrade on the former infrequent service of four per day each way to/from Whitehaven only that previously operated.

Preceding station	National Rail	Following station
Harrington	Northern Trains; Cumbrian Coast Line	Whitehaven
	Historical railways	
Harrington	London and North Western Railway; Whitehaven Junction Railway	Whitehaven
