= Gilgarran Branch =

Railway Line

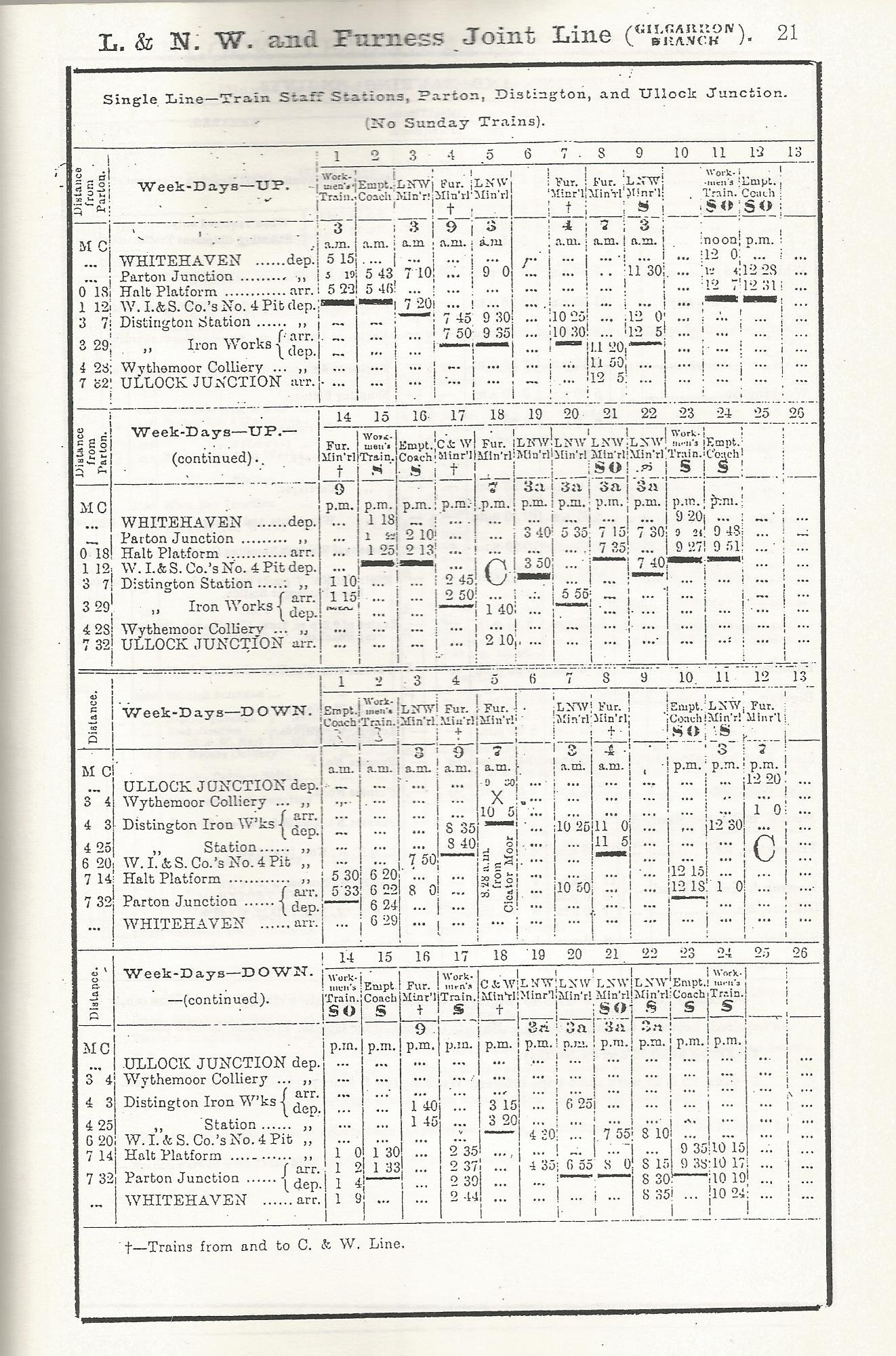
The branch's Working Time Table from 1917

The Gilgarran Branch (occasionally referred to as the Gilgarron Branch) was a 7-mile-32-chain-long (11.9 km) single track railway line connecting four separate railway companies in the former county of Cumberland, now part of Cumbria, England.

== Origins ==
The original Gilgarran Branch was authorised by the Whitehaven, Cleator and Egremont Railway Act 1875 (38 & 39 Vict. c. cxci) on 2 August 1875 to run 2 miles 68 chains (4.6 km) from a junction near Ullock westwards to Gilgarran No 2 Colliery. Extensions were authorised on 27 June 1876, before the original branch opened, to what would become Distington and down the valley of the Lowca Beck to the coast at Parton. The line as a whole became known as the Gilgarran Branch.

The line was proposed by the Whitehaven, Cleator and Egremont Railway (WCER), but by the time it opened in 1879 the company had been bought out by the LNW and Furness Railways who operated its routes as the "LNWR & FR Joint Railway", known locally as "The Joint Lines".

The WCER was commercially successful, paying a significant dividend throughout its existence, but arguably it overplayed its hand, increasing its rates on its near-monopolistic core mineral traffic in the 1870s so much that local Ironmasters decided to dig deep in their pockets and create a new competitor, in the form of the Cleator and Workington Junction Railway.

The Gilgarran Branch was one of a series of defensive measures aimed to stymie the new company.

== Construction and connections ==
The branch was built westwards from the Joint Line's Rowrah to Marron Junction line at Ullock Junction 54.6048°N 3.4383°W, a remote, upland spot with no road access. This first 4 miles 26 chains (7.0 km), gently graded section as far as Distington opened in 1879 and served Wythemoor Colliery and the then recently opened Distington Ironworks.

At Distington the branch both met and crossed the rival CWJR's main line which also opened in 1879. The layout resulted in Distington station having five platform faces, which would turn out to be an immense overprovision.

The branch's second stage curved sharply southwestwards immediately north of the station, following Lowca Beck for 2 miles 77 chains (4.8 km) downhill at an average gradient of 1 in 53 until it joined the goods lines near Parton on the Cumbrian Coast Line. This section opened in 1881 and included at 54.6048°N 3.4383°W a junction known as "Bain's Siding" with a mineral line to Harrington No 10 Colliery on the clifftops at Lowca, in effect making a junction with the Lowca Light Railway.

== Passenger services ==
No passenger service ever operated on Sundays on any part of the branch.

No passenger service ever operated on the Ullock Junction to Distington section.

Public passenger services were provided over two periods between Distington and Whitehaven, using the branch northeastwards from Parton. Two trains a day ran in both directions from this section's opening in 1881, but they were withdrawn in 1883 through lack of custom. The service was reinstated from autumn 1913 (sources disagree whether from October or from November), running on Thursdays (one round trip) and Saturdays (two round trips) only, being withdrawn again at the end of August 1914 at the outbreak of the First World War. Demand for services to a station serving Lowca from Whitehaven was remedied from 11 January 1915 by opening Parton Halt near the foot of the branch, from which workers could climb a steep track to their workplaces. A three-times-a-day, unadvertised, workmen's service was provided until buses provided a more attractive service by 1929, when it was withdrawn.

A second workmen's halt was provided on the western section of the branch around the time of the Second World War, known as United Steel Company's Workmen's Platform. Research continues on details of location, dates and services.

== Freight services ==
As with almost all railways in the area, the dominant traffic was freight in general and minerals in particular. In this regard parts of the Gilgarron Branch were first and last out.

The branch's first customer was Wythemoor Colliery, east of Distington. It closed in 1886, a mere seven years after the branch opened, due to "incompetent management". The colliery reopened in 1904 and wound coal until the 1920s, but the branch eastwards to Ullock Junction from the junction with the colliery siding closed in 1919, all coal heading westwards thereafter. The second customer was Distington Ironworks which ceased production in 1922, overtaken by technological progress in steelmaking. In 1888, for example, just one train a day ran out and back from Ullock Junction to Distington Ironworks, one train a day ran out and back from Parton to Bain's Siding and one train a day ran out and back from the coast to Distington Ironworks, meagre fare for the investment in infrastructure. Perhaps worse, commercially, was that the bulk of traffic to and from Distington Ironworks travelled on the rival CWJR, with only a meagre amount of pig iron travelling down the western part of the branch through Parton to Whitehaven.

The First World War brought extra demand for iron, steel and coal and threw the branch a lifeline. The April 1917 Working Time Table shows three Up mineral trains travelling the first 1 mile 12 chains (1.9 km) eastwards from Parton Junction to Workington Iron & Steel Co's No 4 Pit and two travelling beyond to Distington Ironworks, with an extra on Saturdays, all matched by Down trains.

The line eastwards from Distington Ironworks closed after Wythemoor Pit closed, followed on 2 May 1932 by the section from Distington to Bain's Siding. This left two sections of the branch with rails in place:

- Distington Junction to the site of Distington Ironworks, used only in part as a siding, and
- Parton to Bain's Siding.

The former was to gain an unexpected and as yet undocumented railway life during the Second World War when the High Duty Alloys company was established on the ironworks site, making a wide range of materials, including Hiduminium for war use, such as in aircraft parts. After the war, however, the rail traffic generated for the branch or the CWJR main line was described by an ex-employee as "negligible".

In the early 1960s occasional scrap wagons were loaded at the former Gilgarran Branch Down platform which was being used as a scrapyard by Hanratty's of Workington.

All tracks at Distington were finally closed on 26 September 1965 and subsequently lifted.

The most westerly end of the branch, from Parton to Bain's Siding led a charmed life, outliving not only the rest of the branch but almost all other Joint Lines' and CWJR lines. It survived until May 1973 as it was used to deliver coal from Solway Colliery, Workington, to the washery and bi-product plants at Lowca, the remains of the Lowca Light Railway (LLR) along the clifftops being used to take the finished products away northwards to Moss Bay. The coal was worked southwards from Solway to Parton sidings along the coast line then reversed up the remains of the Gilgarran Branch, past the site of Parton Halt, to Bain's Siding. The points were reset and the train pulled forward up the valley side to Lowca. This zig-zag met the need to climb from sea level which the LLR achieved by extreme gradients.

Lowca's most widely renowned concern - the locomotive manufacturer Lowca Engineering - stood in the Vee between the coast line and the Gilgarran Branch, but mentions of rail traffic to the site are very elusive.

== Special trains ==
Two enthusiasts' special trains composed of guards vans were run over the zig-zag downhill from Lowca to Parton, having been hauled up to the clifftop via the Lowca Light Railway route through Copperas Hill with its famous 1 in 17 incline. The first ran on 2 March 1968, followed on 26 May 1969 by the "Furnessman", which enjoyed steam banking up Copperas Hill and steam haulage down to Parton from Lowca.

== Afterlife ==
By 1981 just a stub remained near the site of Parton Halt, but this had been swept away with the other Civil Engineers sidings at Parton by 2013. The general line of the branch southwest of Distington has been used for improvements to the A595, though the exact course is only followed in part. East of Distington fragments can be discerned, but most has been returned to agricultural use.

== See also ==
- Furness Railway
- Whitehaven, Cleator and Egremont Railway
- Cleator and Workington Junction Railway
