= Bridgefoot railway station =

Disused railway station in Cumbria, England

Bridgefoot
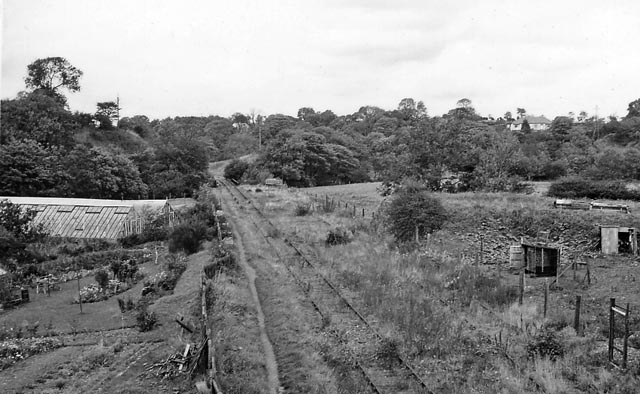
- Site of station in 1961

General information
- Location: Bridgefoot, Cumberland; England
- Coordinates: 54.6503°N 3.4623°W
- Grid reference: NY057293
- Platforms: 2

Other information
- Status: Disused

History
- Original company: Whitehaven, Cleator and Egremont Railway
- Pre-grouping: LNWR & FR Joint Railway
- Post-grouping: London, Midland and Scottish Railway

Key dates
- 2 April 1866: Opened
- 13 April 1931: Closed
Location

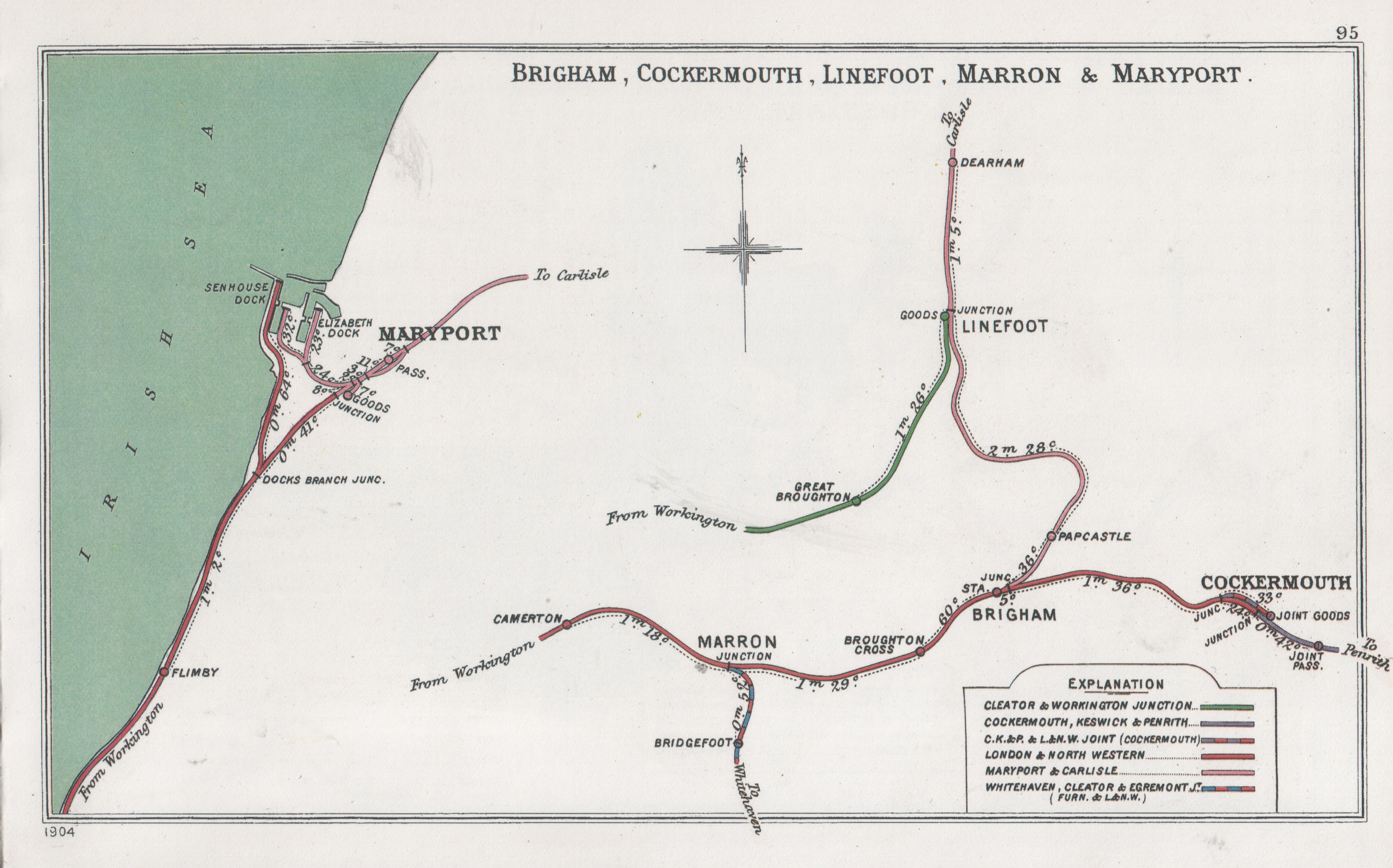
A 1904 Railway Clearing House Junction Diagram showing (right) railways in the vicinity of the station site

Bridgefoot railway station was built by the Whitehaven, Cleator and Egremont Railway. It served the village of Bridgefoot, Cumbria, England.

== History ==
The station opened on 2 April 1866. The owning company was taken over by the LNWR and Furness Railway in 1879 as a Joint Line, whereafter the northern section through Bridgefoot was usually worked by the LNWR.

Passenger traffic consisted of three trains a day in each direction, with an extra on Whitehaven market day and none on Sundays. From opening, northbound passenger trains terminated at Marron Junction station where passengers changed for destinations beyond. In 1897 Marron Junction station closed, with trains running west through to Workington Main thereafter, a much better arrangement for most passengers. Passengers who would otherwise have changed at Marron Junction to head east to Brigham or beyond simply changed at the first stop after Marron Junction - Camerton.

Goods traffic typically consisted of a two daily turns Up and Down.

Mineral traffic was the dominant flow, typically six loaded and six empty through to Workington, though this was subject to considerable fluctuation with trade cycles. Stations and signalling along the line north of Rowrah were changed during the Joint regime to conform to LNWR standards.

The station closed on 13 April 1931 when normal passenger traffic ended along the line. Goods trains continued to pass through the station until 1954. An enthusiasts' special ran through on 5 September 1954. After scant occasional use the line was abandoned in 1960 and subsequently lifted.

== Afterlife ==
In 2013 the course of the line through the village was clear to see and the trackbed to the south had been made into a public footpath.

Preceding station	Disused railways	Following station
Marron Junction; Line and station closed	Whitehaven, Cleator and Egremont Railway	Branthwaite; Line and station closed

== See also ==
- Cockermouth and Workington Railway
- Cockermouth, Keswick and Penrith Railway
