= Eaglesfield, Cumbria =

Village in Cumbria, England

Coordinates: 54.640°N 3.403°W

Eaglesfield
- Village
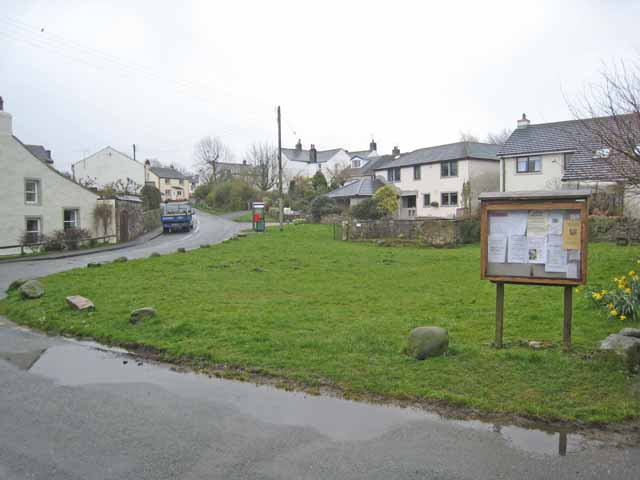
- Village green, Eaglesfield

- Location within Cumbria
- OS grid reference: NY094281
- Civil parish: Dean
- Unitary authority: Cumberland
- Ceremonial county: Cumbria
- Region: North West
- Country: England
- Sovereign state: United Kingdom
- Post town: COCKERMOUTH
- Postcode district: CA13
- Dialling code: 01900
- Police: Cumbria
- Fire: Cumbria
- Ambulance: North West
- UK Parliament: Whitehaven and Workington

Eaglesfield is a village in the parish of Dean in Cumberland in Cumbria, England. It is near the A5086 road, 2.5 miles (4 km) southwest of Cockermouth and is located just outside the Lake District National Park.

== Toponymy ==
Eaglesfield lay in the early Middle Ages within the British kingdom of Rheged, and the first element of the name is perhaps derived from the Brythonic 'eccles' "church" (cognate with Welsh 'eglwys' 'church'). The meaning would be 'open land near a British church' - something that the Anglian settlers would have seen as they "arrived and settled some two miles away down below at Brigham." (The second element, 'Feld', is Old English for 'open country').

Alternatively, it means 'Ecgel's open land' ('Ecgel's feld'). 'Ecgel' is a personal name and possibly "a normal diminutive of compound names such as 'Ecglaf', or Ecgwulf' ".

== Governance ==
Eaglesfield forms part of the civil parish of Dean, which also covers Dean, Deanscales, Branthwaite, Pardshaw and Ullock. There are two tiers of local government covering Dean, at parish and unitary authority level: Dean Parish Council and Cumberland Council. The parish forms part of the parliamentary constituency of Whitehaven and Workington.

=== Administrative history ===
Eaglesfield was historically a township in the ancient parish of Brigham, which formed part of the historic county of Cumberland. The township of Eaglesfield took on civil functions under the poor laws from the 17th century onwards. As such, the township also became a civil parish in 1866, when the legal definition of 'parish' was changed to be the areas used for administering the poor laws.

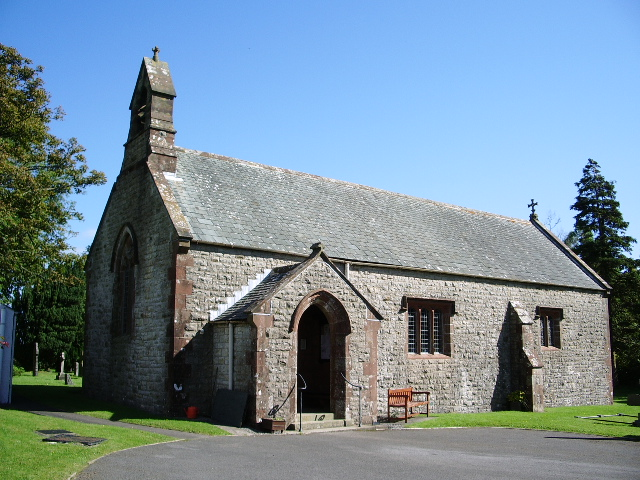
St Philip's Church

An ecclesiastical parish called Mosser was created in 1883, covering four townships from the old Brigham parish, including Eaglesfield. An old chapel of ease at Mosser initially served as the parish church. In 1891, a new church dedicated to St Philip was built in the Eaglesfield township, a short distance east of the village. The church is called St Philip, Mosser, by reference to the ecclesiastical parish it serves, despite not being in the old Mosser township.

In 1934, the civil parish of Eaglesfield was abolished and its area added to the neighbouring parish of Dean. At the 1931 census (the last before the abolition of the parish), Eaglesfield had a population of 233.

== Notable people ==
Eaglesfield was the birthplace of John Dalton (1766–1844), acclaimed chemist, meteorologist and physicist. He was the father of the modern atomic theory.

Eaglesfield was the probable birthplace of Robert de Eglesfield (c.1295–1349), founder of the Queen's College, Oxford. His father, John of Eglesfield, held lands in and near there.

Moorland Close, Eaglesfield, was the birthplace of Fletcher Christian, master's mate aboard HMS Bounty. He led the mutiny against the captain, William Bligh, during their voyage to Tahiti.

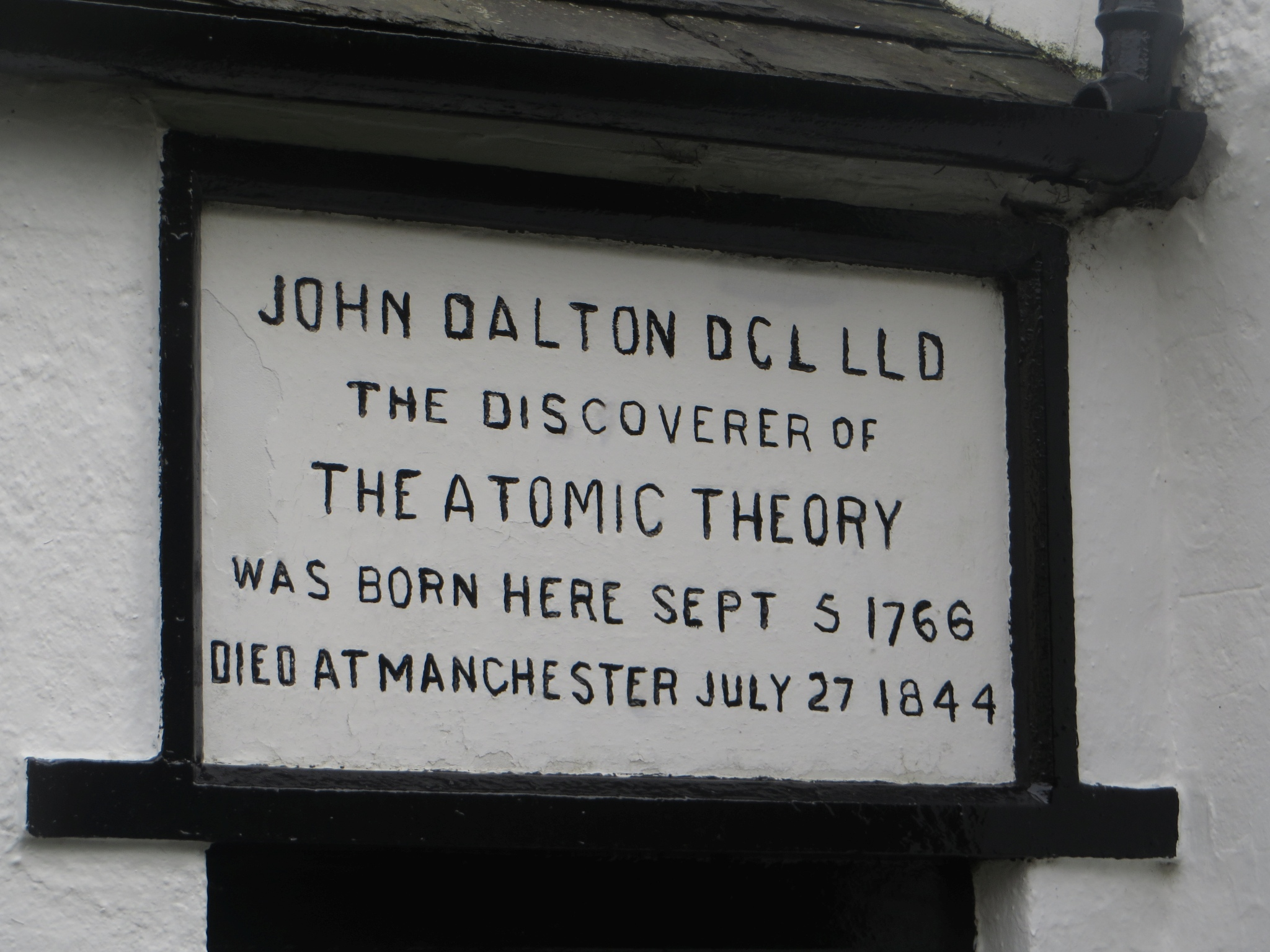
Historical plaque marking birthplace of John Dalton

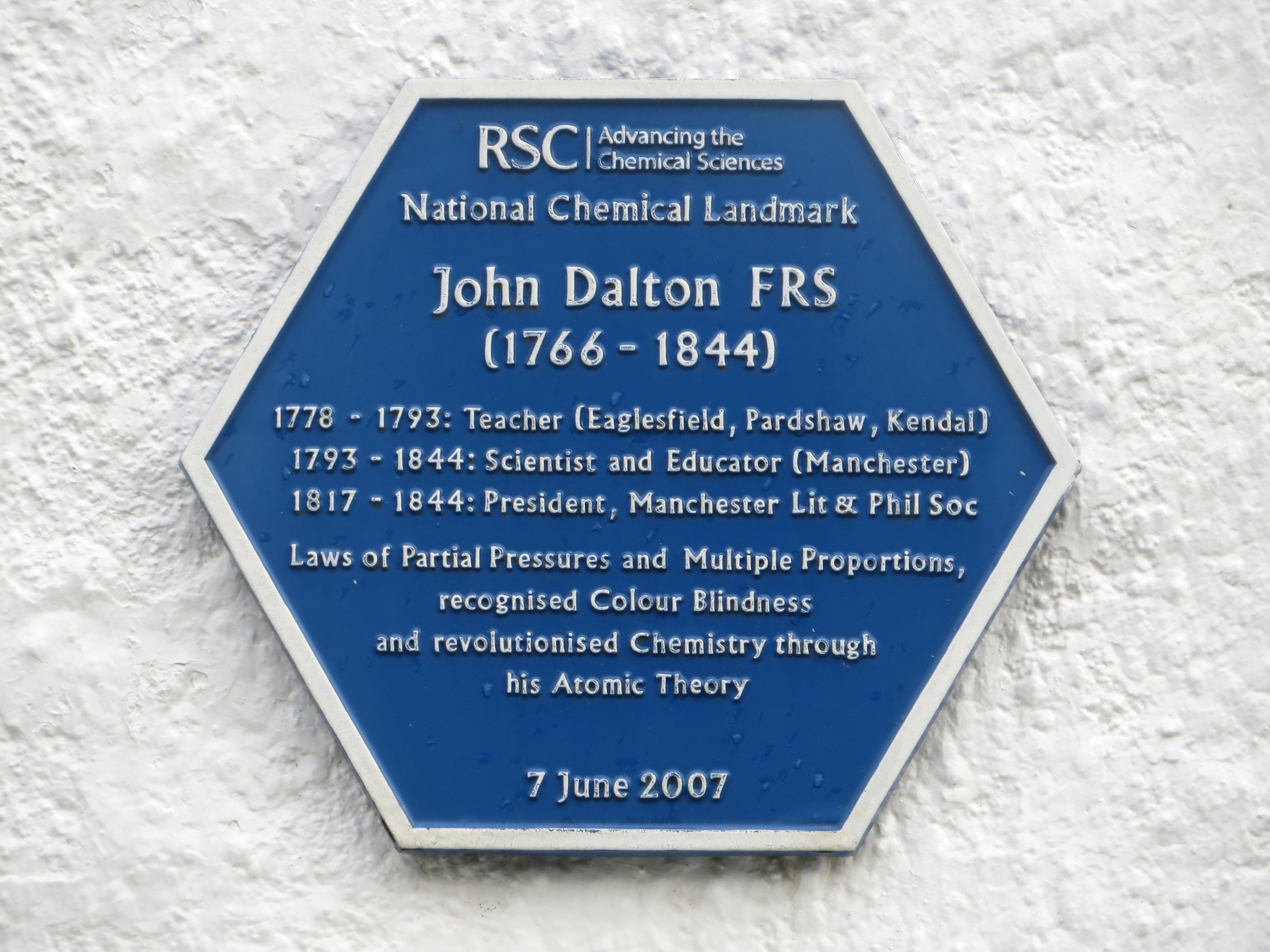
Modern plaque marking birthplace of John Dalton

== See also ==
- Listed buildings in Dean, Cumbria
