= Listed buildings in Dean, Cumbria =

Dean is a civil parish in the Cumberland unitary authority area of Cumbria, England. It contains 37 listed buildings that are recorded in the National Heritage List for England. Of these, two are listed at Grade I, the highest of the three grades, two are at Grade II*, the middle grade, and the others are at Grade II, the lowest grade. The parish contains the villages of Dean, Deanscales, Pardshaw, Branthwaite, Ullock, and Eaglesfield, and the surrounding countryside. The oldest listed building is a churchyard cross, with its medieval base. The most important buildings from a heritage point of view are a church and a tower house, both of which are listed at Grade I. Most of the other listed buildings are houses and associated structures, or farmhouses and farm buildings. The other listed buildings include structures associated with the Friends, a war memorial, and a former packhorse bridge.

== Key ==
Grade	Criteria
I	Buildings of exceptional interest, sometimes considered to be internationally important
II*	Particularly important buildings of more than special interest
II	Buildings of national importance and special interest

== Buildings ==
Name and location	Photograph	Date	Notes	Grade
Churchyard cross 54.61476°N 3.44012°W		Medieval	The cross is in the churchyard of St Oswald's Church, and is in calciferous sandstone. The oldest part is the base of seven octagonal steps, on which is a shaped cross base, possibly dating from the 17th century. Standing on this is an 18th-century sundial shaft without a plate. The churchyard cross is also a scheduled monument.	II
St Oswald's Church; 54.61487°N 3.44027°W		12th century	The church was extended in the 13th and 15th centuries, and altered in the 17th century. It is in calciferous sandstone with green slate roofs that have cross finials on the gables. It consists of a nave, a south aisle, a south porch, a chancel with a north vestry. At the junction of the nave and chancel is a twin bellcote. Features include gargoyles on the chancel, and medieval cross slabs, one built into the north wall, one built into a window sill, and another used as flagging.	I
Branthwaite Hall; 54.61457°N 3.44901°W		Late 14th century (probable)	A tower house with a hall wing added in the 16th century, it is in calciferous sandstone and red sandstone, partly rendered, and has roofs of green slate. The tower has four storeys, it contains various openings, and has an embattled parapet. The hall has three storeys and six bays, with a three-storey stair projection. The windows on the front are sashes in architraves, those in the ground floor have cornices, and in the upper floor they have segmental pediments. Elsewhere are windows with Tudor arched heads and hood moulds.	I
Crakeplace Hall; 54.60279°N 3.44123°W	—	Mid 16th century	A farmhouse, extended in 1612, and altered later. It is roughcast and has a green slate roof with coped gables. There are 2 1/2 storeys, three bays, an integral stable on the left, and a right-angled extension on the right, giving an L-shaped plan. The main part has mullioned windows with hood moulds, and in the extension are sash windows. There is a lean-to porch that has a doorway with an architrave and an inscribed stone.	II*
Hillcrest and barns 54.60287°N 3.43413°W	—	Early 17th century	The farmhouse and barn were extended and altered during the following two centuries, and they have a green slate roof. The house is roughcast and has two storeys and four bays, with a rear 19th-century extension. The windows in the original part are casements in chamfered surrounds with the mullions removed, and there are continuous hood moulds in each floor. In the extension the windows are sashes. The barn to the left has an L-shaped plan, and contains doorways, loft doors, a cart entrance, a window, and ventilation slits.	II
Packhouse bridge 54.62458°N 3.45915°W		17th century (probable)	The packhorse bridge crosses the River Marron, and has later been used as a footbridge. It is in calciferous sandstone, and consists of a single wide segmental arch, with low solid parapets.The bridge is also a scheduled monument.	II
The Cottage; 54.61001°N 3.40308°W	—	1662	The house was altered and extended in the 19th century. It is roughcast and has a green slate roof. There are two storeys and two bays, with a higher single-bay extension to the right. The doorway has a stone surround and a segmental wooden hood. The windows are casements, those in the original part having hood moulds.	II
Dalton House and Cottage; 54.64138°N 3.40587°W		17th century (probable)	The cottage and the house have been combined into one property. The cottage was the birthplace of John Dalton, and the house dates from the 18th century. They are roughcast with green slate roofs, and both have two storeys. The house has two bays, a doorway with a chamfered surround, and sash windows. The cottage has three bays, and a porch with an inscribed plaque above.	II
Far Branthwaite Edge, dairy and barn 54.60207°N 3.45801°W	—	1683	A farmhouse with adjoining dairy and barn, the barn dating from the late 18th century. The house is roughcast with a green slate roof, and has two storeys and three bays, and a two-bay extension at the rear. The windows are mullioned under cornices, and in the extension they are sashes. To the left is a single-storey dairy with two doorways, one with an architrave, and the other with a partly chamfered surround. The barn, to the right, is in sandstone with a corrugated asbestos roof. It has a partly blocked cart entrance with voussoirs, a loft door, casement windows, and ventilation slits.	II
Friends' Burial Ground wall, Eaglesfield; 54.63910°N 3.40617°W	—	1693	The low wall surrounds three sides of the burial ground. It is in limestone with irregular coping, and contains a plank door.	II
Croft Foot Farmhouse and barn 54.64007°N 3.40173°W	—	1705	The farmhouse and barn are roughcast with a green slate roof. The house has two storeys and three bays, and the windows are sashes, those in the upper floor in original chamfered surrounds. To the right is a long barn that contains doorways and a casement window.	II
Friends' Meeting House, Eaglesfield; 54.63925°N 3.40645°W	—	1711	The former meeting house, later used as a private house, is roughcast with a green slate roof. It is in a single storey, it has three bays, and above the doorway is an inscription. The windows are mullioned and contain casements. At the rear is a slated porch.	II
Croft House and barn 54.60430°N 3.42946°W	—	Early 18th century	The farmhouse and barn have green slate roofs. The house is roughcast, it has two storeys and three bays, and the windows are sashes. The barn is in sandstone and has doorways and an extension.	II
Rose Farmhouse; 54.61386°N 3.43687°W	—	Early 18th century	The farmhouse was altered in the 19th century. It is pebbledashed with a green slate roof, and has two storeys and three bays. Some of the windows are sashes, and others are casements.	II
Whitekeld and barns 54.59127°N 3.43909°W	—	Early 18th century	The farmhouse incorporates parts of earlier buildings. The farmhouse and the attached barns have green slate roofs. The house is rendered, and has two storeys and two bays. The doorway has an architrave, a pulvinated frieze and a scrolled pediment, and the windows are sashes. The barns are in mixed calciferous sandstone and red sandstone, and are right-angled on both sides of the house, forming a U-shaped plan.	II
West House and barns 54.64118°N 3.40557°W	—	Early 18th century	The farmhouse and barns have green slate roofs. The house is stuccoed, it has two storeys and three bays, and the windows are sashes. The barns to the right are lower, they are in limestone, and they contain doorways and ventilation slits.	II
Friends' Meeting House and walls, Pardshaw; 54.61632°N 3.38932°W	—	1729	The meeting house has since been used for other purposes. It is in calciferous sandstone with a green slate roof, and has a single storey, five bays, and a rear extension giving a T-shaped plan. The windows are in architraves, some are sashes, and others are casements. A low sandstone wall encloses the burial ground on three sides.	II*
Wadsworth Farmhouse; 54.61066°N 3.45961°W	—	1735	The farmhouse is in calciferous sandstone with quoins, an eaves cornice, and a green slate roof. There are two storeys and four bays, with a two-bay wing at the rear. In the ground floor are casement windows partly in mullioned surrounds, and in the upper floor are sash windows in architraves. The rear wall contains mullioned windows, and in the rear wing are two Venetian windows.	II
Brow Top; 54.61144°N 3.45379°W	—	1738	Originally two houses, later converted into one, it is in calciferous sandstone with quoins, an eaves cornice, and a green slate roof. It has two storeys and two bays. The doorway has a chamfered surround, and the twin doorway to the left is blocked. The windows are horizontally sliding sashes, and in the upper floor are two blocked windows.	II
Friends' Schoolroom; 54.61642°N 3.38963°W		1745	The schoolroom incorporates parts of earlier buildings dated 1672 and 1731. It is in rubble with a green slate roof. The building is in a single storey and has three bays, and a right-angled stable at the left, giving an L-shaped plan. It contains plank doors, windows, some of which are sashes and others are casements, and there is also a blocked mullioned window.	II
Hill Crest; 54.61145°N 3.45450°W	—	1747	A stuccoed house on a squared plinth, with quoins and a green slate roof. It has two storeys and a symmetrical front of three bays. The central doorway has an architrave with a segmental hood, and the windows are sashes.	II
Bank Farmhouse and barns 54.64182°N 3.40491°W	—	Mid 18th century	The farmhouse and barns were altered in the 19th century, and they have green slate roofs. The house is roughcast with angle pilasters, and has two storeys and three bays, with a single-bay extension to the right. The doorway has an architrave, the windows in the original part of the house are horizontally sliding sashes, and in the extension they are larger sashes. To the right is a lower, then a higher, barn. The barns have casement windows, doorways, and round vents.	II
Moorland Close and former stables 54.64474°N 3.38331°W	—	Mid 18th century	The farmhouse and stables are roughcast with green slate roofs. The house has two storeys and two bays, with a single-bay extension to the left. The windows are sashes, and there are two doorways with re-set inscribed lintels. The former stables have quoins and an extension in rendered brick.	II
Springfield Farmhouse; 54.63878°N 3.40478°W	—	Mid 18th century	The farmhouse is rendered with quoins, an eaves cornice, and a green slate roof. It has two storeys and three bays, with a single-bay extension to the right. The doorway has a porch with fluted pilasters, a segmental hood, and an architrave. The windows are sashes.	II
Manor House; 54.61365°N 3.43670°W	—	1753	A roughcast house with quoins, an eaves cornice, and a green slate roof with coped gables. It has two storeys and three bays, a doorway with a quoined surround, and sash windows in architraves.	II
The Raise; 54.60243°N 3.45406°W	—	1758	A roughcast farmhouse with quoins, an eaves cornice, and a green slate roof. It has two storeys and three bays. The doorway has an alternate-block surround, and the windows are sashes in architraves.	II
Roche House; 54.61134°N 3.45478°W	—	1759	A roughcast house with large projecting plinth stones and a green slate roof. It has two storeys and two bays. The central doorway has an alternate-block surround, and the windows are mullioned with casements.	II
Summer House, garden wall and gateways, Moorland Close; 54.64541°N 3.38307°W	—	Mid or late 18th century	The high walls surround four sides of the garden and contain bee boles; three sides are in rubble with saddleback coping, and the other is in brick. The main entrance has gate piers in rusticated ashlar. The summer house is in brick with quoins and a pyramidal green slate roof. In the ground floor are blocked segmental arches, external steps lead up to a doorway, and the windows are sashes.	II
Dean Mains; 54.61378°N 3.43680°W	—	Late 18th century	A roughcast house with a green slate roof. It has two storeys and three bays, and contains sash windows.	II
Home Farm and barns 54.62491°N 3.40579°W	—	Late 18th century	The farmhouse and attached barns are rendered with green slate roofs. The house has two storeys and four bays. The door has a quoined surround and a fanlight. Some of the windows are sashes, and others are casements. There is a barn to the left with double doors, and a right-angled barn to the right.	II
The Rectory; 54.61439°N 3.44070°W	—	Late 18th century	A roughcast vicarage with a green slate roof, in two storeys and four bays. On the front is a porch, above the door is a fanlight, and the windows are sashes.	II
Orchard House and barn, Eaglesfield; 54.63868°N 3.40506°W	—	1816	The farmhouse and barn have a green slate roof. The house is stuccoed, it has two storeys and three bays, and there is a central door with a plain surround. Some windows are sashes, and others are casements, all in architraves. To the right is a barn with a L-shaped plan which contains a large cart entrance, a doorway, and casement windows.	II
Orchard House, Dean; 54.61417°N 3.43627°W	—	Early 19th century	The house is stuccoed on a squared plinth, and has eaves modillions, quoins, and a greenslate roof with coped gables. It has two storeys and three bays, The doorway has a pilastered surround, and the windows are sashes.	II
Barn, Ullock Main (north); 54.60401°N 3.43014°W	—	Early 19th century	The barn is in sandstone, and has a green slate roof with coped gables. It has two storeys and two bays, with a rear extension giving a T-shaped plan. The openings have round heads. On the front is a large opening with plank doors, and in the right return are pigeon holes.	II
Barn, Ullock Main (west); 54.60368°N 3.43004°W	—	Early 19th century	The barn is in mixed yellow and pink sandstone, and has quoins and a hipped green slate roof. There are two storeys and three bays, and a right-angled extension on the right. The barn contains doorways with pointed arches and bulls-eye vents in two tiers. In the extension are plank doors, loft doors, and more vents.	II
Eaglesfield War Memorial; 54.63961°N 3.38544°W	—	1920	The war memorial is in the churchyard of St Philip's Church, Eaglesfield. It is in polished grey granite, and consists of an obelisk on a plinth with a moulded cap, on a two-stepped square base. On the plinth are inscriptions and the names of those lost in the two World Wars.	II
