= Ullock =

Village in Cumbria, England

Coordinates: 54.601791°N 3.431852°W

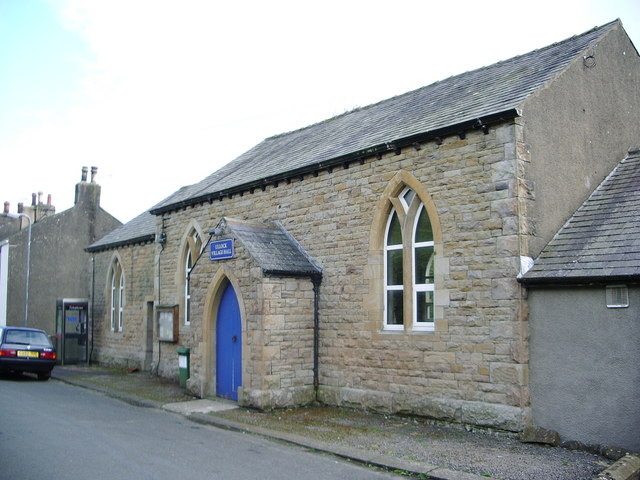
- Ullock Village Hall

- Location in Allerdale, Cumbria Location within Cumbria
- OS grid reference: NY076239
- Civil parish: Dean
- Unitary authority: Cumberland
- Ceremonial county: Cumbria
- Region: North West
- Country: England
- Sovereign state: United Kingdom
- Post town: WORKINGTON
- Postcode district: CA14
- Dialling code: 01900
- Police: Cumbria
- Fire: Cumbria
- Ambulance: North West
- UK Parliament: Whitehaven and Workington

Ullock is a village in Cumbria, England, located at National Grid reference NY076239, approximately 5 miles (8.0 km) south west of Cockermouth and 5.4 miles (8.7 km) south east of Workington. The River Marron flows through the village. It is located just outside the Lake District National Park. In 1870-72 the township had a population of 353.

The village was once served by Ullock railway station on the Whitehaven, Cleator and Egremont Railway.

== Governance ==
Ullock is in the parliamentary constituency of Whitehaven and Workington.

The former Labour MP for what was the neighbouring constituency of Workington from 2015-2019, Sue Hayman, was elevated to the House of Lords in 2020 under the title Baroness Hayman of Ullock.

For Local Government purposes it is in the Cumberland unitary authority area.

Ullock does not have its own parish council, instead it is part of Dean Parish Council, which also covers villages of Dean, Deanscales, Eaglesfield, Pardshaw and Branthwaite.

== See also ==
- Listed buildings in Dean, Cumbria
