= Lamplugh =

Civil parish in Cumbria, England

Coordinates: 54.5743°N 3.4113°W

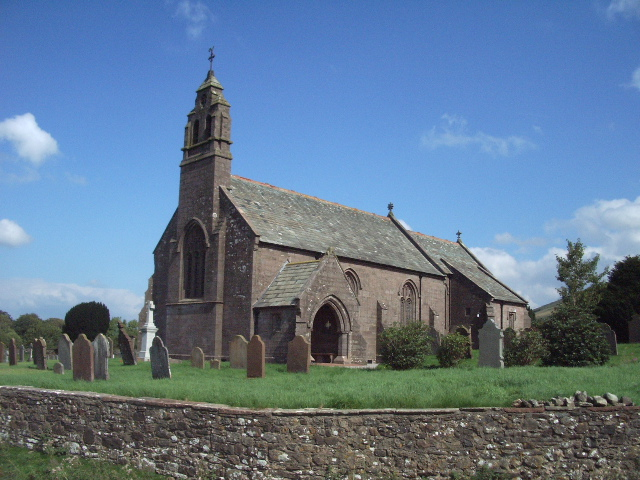
- St. Michael's Church, Lamplugh

- Location in Copeland Borough Location within Cumbria
- Population: 805 (2011)
- OS grid reference: NY088208
- Civil parish: Lamplugh
- Unitary authority: Cumberland
- Ceremonial county: Cumbria
- Region: North West
- Country: England
- Sovereign state: United Kingdom
- Post town: WORKINGTON
- Postcode district: CA14
- Dialling code: 01946
- Police: Cumbria
- Fire: Cumbria
- Ambulance: North West
- UK Parliament: Whitehaven and Workington

Lamplugh (/ˈlæmplə/) is a scattered community and civil parish located in West Cumbria on the edge of the English Lake District and historically part of Cumberland. It had a population of 763 in 2001, increasing to 805 at the 2011 Census.

The main A5086 road from Cockermouth to Egremont runs roughly north–south through the community. The Whitehaven Cleator and Egremont Railway, later LMS, also ran through the parish, with a station in Wright Green. North of Rowrah this lost its passenger service in 1931 and was closed to all traffic in 1954.

Unusually, the village has no obvious centre. While St. Michael's church is built on the highest point in the village, the local pub, the Lamplugh Tip Inn, is over a mile away on the A5086. The inn was closed for some time for renovation but has now reopened.

Lamplugh School (the local primary school) is at the hamlet of Kirkland. Because Lamplugh Civil Parish is very large, it includes Kirkland as well as Eskett and also, until recent boundary changes, parts of both Ennerdale Bridge and Rowrah.

The village is on the edge of the Lake District National Park. The roads from St. Michael's Church towards Loweswater and from the church towards Ennerdale form part of the national park boundary, with the national park lying to the east of the roads. While parts of the village lie within the national park, almost all dwellings are outside the national park and so are cheaper than in Loweswater.

The boundary of this large parish is shown on 1:25,000 O.S. sheet OL4 "English Lakes NW". Much more information about Lamplugh is available in "The Parish of Lamplugh" published by the parish council in 1993 ISBN 0-9522511-0-8, and "Lamplugh Church" published by Lamplugh and District Heritage Society in 2004. ISBN 0-9547482-0-4

Lamplugh is the starting point for a number of walks, and is also on the Sea to Sea / C2C / Coast to Coast Cycle Route, which runs along the roads forming the national park boundary described above.

Lamplugh, renamed "Crossbridge", features in two of Melvyn Bragg's novels - "The Hired Man" and "Without a City Wall" On 2 June 2010, Lamplugh was the scene of the first murder during the killing spree known as the Cumbria shootings, when Derrick Bird, of Rowrah, shot his twin brother, David, who was a resident of Lamplugh.

== See also ==
- Listed buildings in Lamplugh
- Llan place name element
