= Marron Junction railway station =

Disused railway station in Cumbria, England

Marron Junction

General information
- Location: Bridgefoot, Cumberland; England
- Coordinates: 54.6573°N 3.4656°W
- Grid reference: NY055301
- Platforms: 3

Other information
- Status: Disused

History
- Original company: Cockermouth & Workington Railway
- Pre-grouping: London and North Western Railway
- Post-grouping: London, Midland and Scottish Railway

Key dates
- 2 April 1866: Opened
- 1 July 1897: Closed to regular passenger traffic
- after 1923: Closed completely
Location

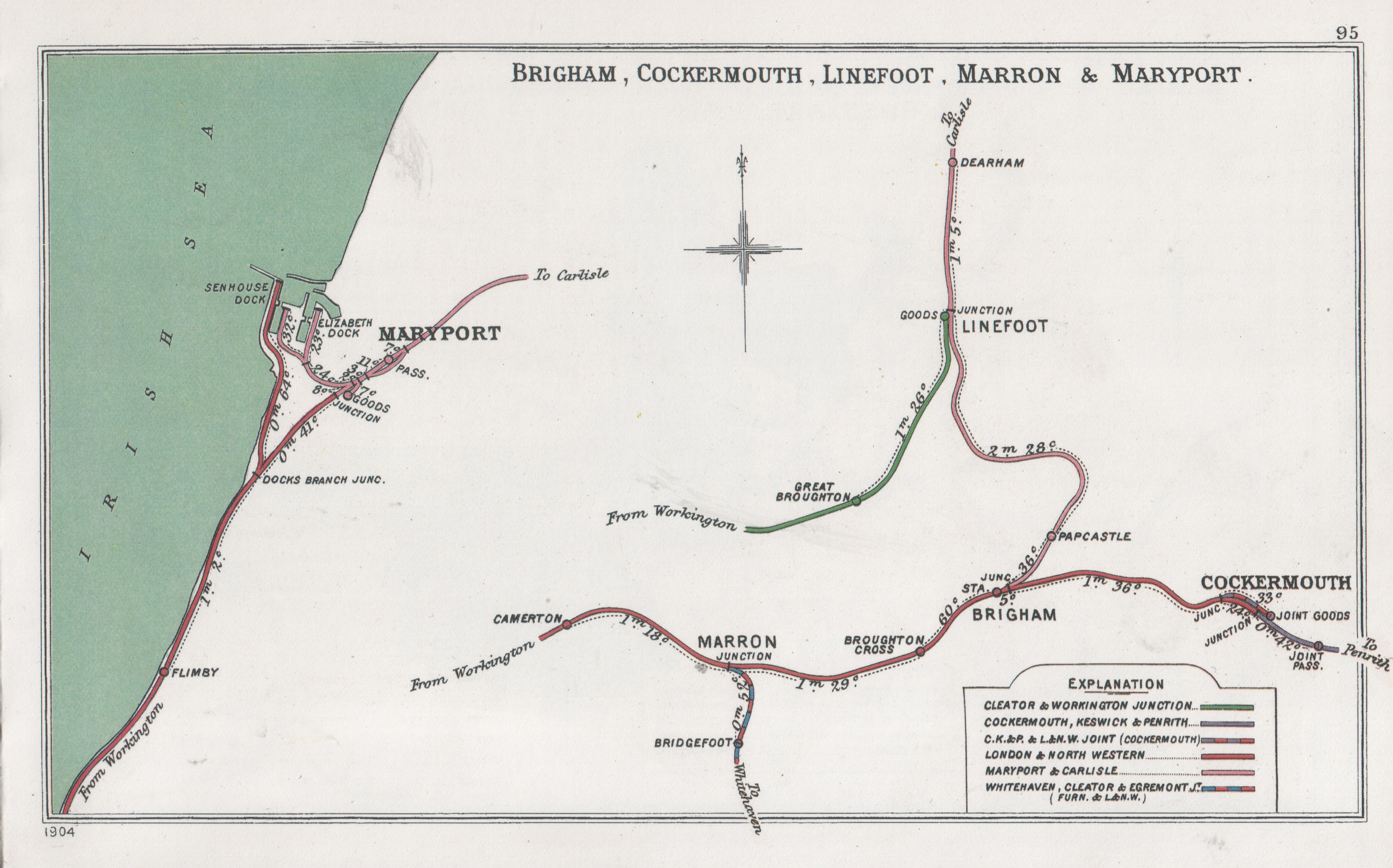
A 1904 Railway Clearing House Junction Diagram showing (right) railways in the vicinity of the station site

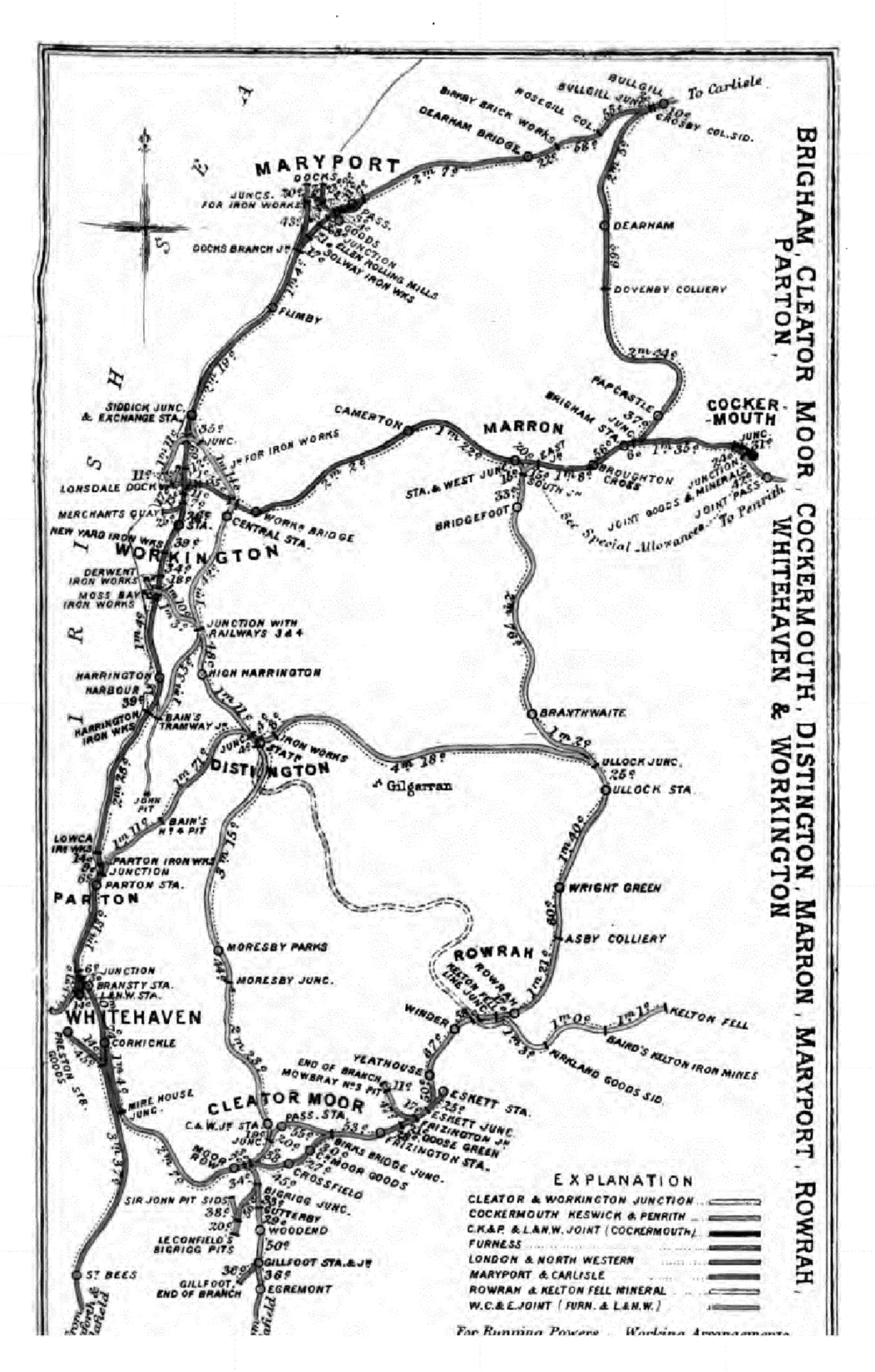
An 1882 Railway Clearing House Junction Diagram showing railways in the area

Marron Junction railway station was a later addition to the Cockermouth and Workington Railway. It opened on 2 April 1866 with a single, eastbound, platform when the adjacent Marron Junction opened, two months before the company was absorbed by the London and North Western Railway.

In 1874 an island platform was added to the south of the main east–west line, opposite the single eastbound platform. giving three platform faces.

== History ==
Marron Junction joined the west-east Workington to Cockermouth (later through to Penrith) line with the then new south–north Whitehaven, Cleator and Egremont Railway line from Rowrah. The junction was in open country. It had a substantial triangular layout with an engine shed inside the south-to-east arm. Both the west-to-east and south-to-west arms bridged the River Marron. Marron Junction station was immediately west of the junction's northwestern apex. The triangular layout warranted three signalboxes, one at each apex.

This isolated rural location was further complicated by a branch to Linefitz Colliery running from the west and bisecting the south-to-east arm of the triangle, similarly to Earlestown.

The station was bounded by the River Derwent to the north and was not near any town or village. It was intended as an exchange station for passengers crossing between the east–west and south–north lines. South-north trains terminated at Marron Junction station, from which passengers could travel west or east. The value of this arrangement hinged on the connections.

The station attracted little custom other than railwaymen whose duties took them to Marron Junction.

The station closed to regular passenger traffic in 1897. From then on the south–north trains from Rowrah continued through to Workington Main, an altogether more satisfactory service for its users. Passengers wishing to travel south to east stayed on to the next stop west of the junction - Camerton - and crossed to the other platform to head east.

Although Marron Junction station closed in 1897 railwaymen continued to use it as an unadvertised halt until after 1923.

The south-to-east curve at Marron junction was closed on 1 October 1902. This rendered the south and east signalboxes redundant. The western 'box was replaced to befit its singular role. Normal passenger traffic ended along the south to west curve on 13 April 1931, with normal goods traffic following in 1954. An enthusiasts' special ran south-to-west on 5 September 1954. After scant occasional use the south-to-west line was abandoned in 1960.

== Afterlife ==
By 2015 Marron Junction triangle was readily discernible on satellite images online. The station site appeared to be a footpath through ribbons of trees.

Preceding station	Disused railways	Following station
Broughton Cross; Line and station closed	London and North Western Railway; Cockermouth & Workington Railway	Camerton; Line and station closed
Bridgefoot; Line and station closed	Whitehaven, Cleator and Egremont Railway	Camerton; Line and station closed

== See also ==
- Cockermouth, Keswick and Penrith Railway
