= Dean, Cumbria =

Village and civil parish in Cumbria, England

Coordinates: 54.614°N 3.436°W

Dean
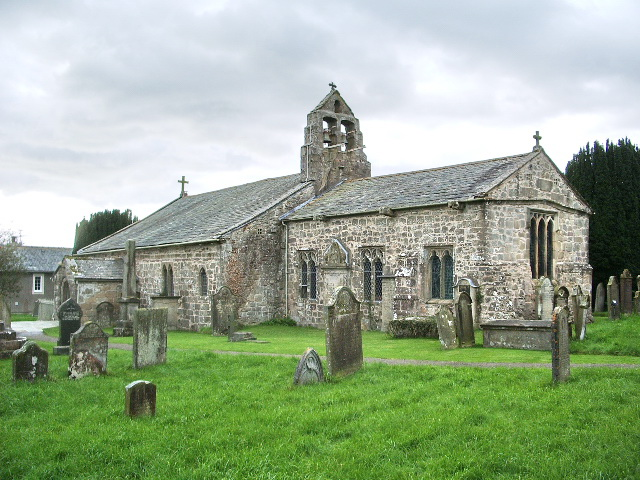
- St. Oswald's Church, Dean

- Location in Allerdale Location within Cumbria
- Population: 1,227 (2011)
- OS grid reference: NY0749225226
- Civil parish: Dean
- Unitary authority: Cumberland
- Ceremonial county: Cumbria
- Region: North West
- Country: England
- Sovereign state: United Kingdom
- Post town: Workington
- Postcode district: CA14
- Dialling code: 01946
- Police: Cumbria
- Fire: Cumbria
- Ambulance: North West
- UK Parliament: Whitehaven and Workington

Dean is a village and civil parish in the county of Cumbria, England. Dean has a Church of England school, a church called St Oswald's. Nearby settlements include the towns of Workington and Cockermouth.

== Location ==
Dean is located in Cumberland, in the west of Cumbria in the North West of England. It is situated 7 kilometres (4 mi) south-west of Cockermouth, on a minor road off the A5086. It is about 3 kilometres (2 mi) west of the nearest part of the Lake District National Park. The nearest tourist information centre is in Cockermouth.

== The village ==
The village contains The Royal Yew Inn, a traditional country pub. Dean is also home to the Dean Church of England Primary School, which also serves three other small villages. Dean is situated in fertile farming land; it has existed for a long time, dating back to the 12th century through the evidence of the 12th century church, and a grammar school founded in 1596. Forms of agriculture in the 19th century include wheat, oats and potatoes. The Curwens of Workington are known to have been the principal landowners in the area.

== Governance ==
Dean is in the parliamentary constituency of Whitehaven and Workington.

For Local Government purposes it is in the Cumberland unitary authority area.

Dean has its own parish council, Dean Parish Council, which also covers villages of Branthwaite, Deanscales, Eaglesfield, Pardshaw and Ullock.

== St Oswald's Church ==
St Oswald's Church is on the edge of the village and dates back to the 12th century. A chancel was added in the 15th century and a sanctuary in the 17th century. From 1967 to 1973 extensive renovations were carried out which included new oak pews and a pulpit.

Other features include the Norman font and the 15th century chancel windows. St Oswald's Church is one of three in Cumbria to have gargoyles. In the graveyard there are several ancient gravestones and a Preaching Cross, the base of which is 12th century or earlier and thought to have been used by the monks of Calder Abbey. The church is built in blocks of calciferous sandstone and has green slate roofs.

== Toponymy ==
'Dean' is from the Old English 'denu' meaning 'valley'.

== History ==
There are records for Dean's housing and population up to the 1961 census; they show that in 1961 there was a population of 710 with 214 houses. The census records go back to 1831. The village population has fluctuated between the 500s and the 700s between 1931 and 1961, having the highest population between 1821 and 1881.

Dean's housing has only ever consisted of about 200 houses. This number has fluctuated, with a loss of 30 properties between 1901 and 1931. However the number of properties in Dean has now risen to 214.

== Climate ==
The climate in Dean is that of the north-west of England, which is exposed to large amounts of rainfall due to the fact that the region is home to high ground. Despite this though Dean is seen to be drier than the surrounding areas with less than 800mm of rain a year this is because it is benefited by the rain shadow effect because of the high ground of North Wales and the Lake District. The coldest months for the area would be January and February but the warmest month would be July.

Because North West England is among the more exposed parts of the UK, and relatively close to the North Atlantic and containing large upland areas, Cumbria is subject to strong winds. The strongest winds can be felt most in the winter half of the year, especially from December to February.

== See also ==
- Listed buildings in Dean, Cumbria
