= Listed buildings in Lamplugh =

Lamplugh is a civil parish in the Cumberland district of Cumbria, England. It contains twelve listed buildings that are recorded in the National Heritage List for England. Of these, one is listed at Grade II*, the middle of the three grades, and the others are at Grade II, the lowest grade. The parish contains the village of Lamplugh, and is otherwise rural. Most of the listed buildings are houses and associated structures, farms and farm buildings. The other listed buildings comprise a church and a coffin rest.

== Key ==
Grade	Criteria
II*	Particularly important buildings of more than special interest
II	Buildings of national importance and special interest

== Buildings ==
Name and location	Photograph	Date	Notes	Grade
Gateway at Lamplugh Hall; 54.57392°N 3.41084°W		1595	The gateway is in stone and consists of a moulded archway with a pointed head, a rectangular hood mould, and a stepped parapet. On the front is a panel containing a coat of arms, initials, and the date, and in the apex is a datestone. At the rear is a sundial containing an inscription and a brass gnomon.	II
High Trees, west farmhouse and byre range 54.56678°N 3.42112°W	—	17th century	The farmhouse is in rendered stone on a chamfered plinth, with rusticated quoins, a band, a cornice, and a slate roof. There are two storeys and a symmetrical north front of three bays. The front contains a central doorway and sash windows, all in architraves. The east front has a door in a chamfered surround, mullioned windows, and a continuous hood mould. The byre range at the rear contains doors, windows and a loft door.	II
High Trees, east farmhouse, cart-shed and store 54.56659°N 3.42082°W	—	Late 17th to early 18th century (probable)	The buildings are pebbledashed and have slate roofs. The house and store have two storeys and four bays, with outshuts at the rear. The house has a central doorway, a continuous hood mould, and one casement window, the other windows being sashes, and in the store is a small fixed window. The cart shed to the left has one tall storey and three bays, and it contains a segmental-headed cart entrance.	II
Whinnah Cottages and store 54.57125°N 3.42991°W	—	1700	A row of pebbledashed cottages with a slate roof, two storeys and outshuts at the rear. One of the doors on the front has a dated lintel, and the windows are sashes. At the rear is a richly carved doorcase constructed from re-used stones with dog-tooth and cable decoration.	II
Low Leys farmhouse, scullery and courtyard entrance 54.56040°N 3.44401°W	—	Late 17th to early 18th century	The buildings are in stone with a roof of 20th-century concrete tiles. The house has a cornice, two storeys, a symmetrical front of three bays, a central doorway, and outshuts at the rear. The scullery to the right has two bays and a plank door with a chamfered surround. All the windows are sashes in stone surrounds. To the right of the scullery is a large wagon arch containing a loft door and a window that leads to a courtyard.	II
Stoneywath farmhouse 54.54281°N 3.42378°W	—	Early 18th century	The farmhouse was later extended, and has two storeys. The original part is stuccoed, and has an end pilaster, a cornice, and a roof hipped to the east, with slate on the front and 20th-century concrete tiles at the rear. There is a symmetrical front of three bays, a central doorway with an architrave, and a pediment. The windows are sashes in architraves. To the right is a single-bay pebbledashed scullery containing a door in a stone surround.	II
Coffin rest 54.57338°N 3.42272°W	—	18th century (possible)	The coffin rest is in the garden of Low Millgillhead. It is in stone, and has a plinth measuring about 3 feet (0.91 m) high, 8.5 feet (2.6 m) long, and 4.5 feet (1.4 m) wide. In the centre is a chamfered sandstone shaft about 4.5 feet (1.4 m) high.	II
Todhole farmhouse 54.58677°N 3.43252°W	—	1796 (possible)	The farmhouse was later extended; it is stuccoed with a slate roof. There are two storeys, the original part has a symmetrical front of three bays, with a central doorway flanked by horizontally-sliding sash windows. To the right is a single-bay extension, and at the rear is the former dairy with a plank door. All the other windows are sashes.	II
Low Millgillhead, coach house and stables 54.57319°N 3.42320°W	—	Late 18th to early 19th century	The buildings are in stone with slate roofs. The house has quoins, a hipped roof, and two storeys. The front facing the road has three bays, a central door with a stone surround and a shaped pediment, and sash windows. The garden front has five bays, two doors, a gabled porch, and varied windows including a large stair window. The coach house and stables, now converted for residential use, are at right angles, and contain seven stable doors, a semicircular coach entrance, and two pitching eyes.	II
Havercroft farmhouse 54.58498°N 3.42904°W	—	19th century (probable)	A stuccoed house with a hipped slate roof. There are two storeys, and a symmetrical front of seven bays. The central door has a porch with a cornice, and the windows are sashes. At the rear is a semicircular stair window.	II
Lamplugh Hall; 54.57347°N 3.41092°W	—	19th century	The original hall and its detached pele tower were demolished in 1821. The replacement of the hall is in pebbledashed stone and has a slate roof. It has two storeys, the front facing the road is symmetrical, with four bays, the doors are on the sides, and the windows are sashes.	II
St Michaels' Church; 54.57415°N 3.41150°W		1870	Designed by William Butterfield, the church is in stone on a chamfered plinth, with stepped buttresses and slate roofs with stone copings, and an apex cross on the east gable. It consists of a nave with a gabled south porch, and a chancel with a south vestry. At the west end is a large double bellcote, and at the east end are three re-used gargoyles. The windows contain Perpendicular tracery.	II*
