= St Oswald's Church, Dean =

Coordinates: 54.6149°N 3.4403°W

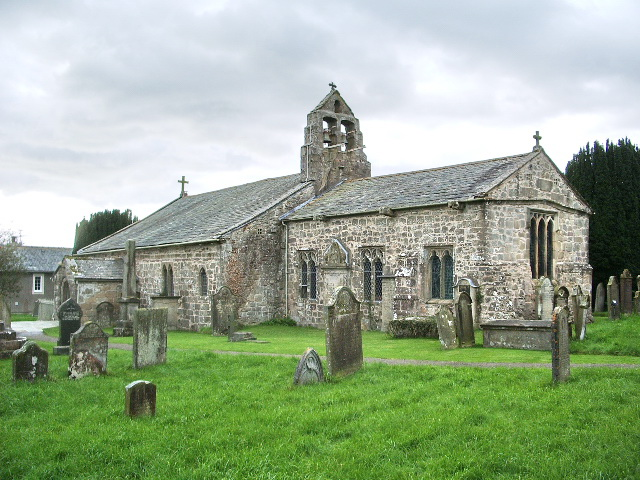
- St Oswald's Church, Dean, from the southeast

- Location in Cumbria
- OS grid reference: NY 070 253
- Location: Dean, Cumbria
- Country: England
- Denomination: Anglican
- Website: St Oswald, Dean

History
- Status: Parish church
- Dedication: Saint Oswald

Architecture
- Functional status: Active
- Heritage designation: Grade I
- Designated: 5 September 1986
- Architectural type: Church
- Style: Norman, Gothic
- Groundbreaking: 12th century
- Completed: 1973

Specifications
- Materials: Calciferous sandstone, slate roofs

Administration
- Province: York
- Diocese: Carlisle
- Archdeaconry: West Cumberland
- Deanery: Derwent
- Parish: Dean

Clergy
- Vicar: Revd Ken Kitchin

St Oswald's Church is in the village of Dean, Cumbria, England. It is an active Anglican parish church in the deanery of Derwent, the archdeaconry of West Cumberland and the diocese of Carlisle. The church is recorded in the National Heritage List for England as a designated Grade I listed building.

== History ==
St Oswald's dates from the 12th century, with an extension in the following century. The chancel was added in the 15th century and the sanctuary in the 17th century. An extensive restoration was carried out between 1967 and 1973, which included new pews and a pulpit.

== Architecture ==
The church is built in blocks of calciferous sandstone and has green slate roofs. The roofs have coped gables and cross finials. Its plan consists of a three bay nave with a south aisle and a south porch, and a three-bay chancel with a north vestry. On the gable between the nave and the chancel is a twin open bellcote. Gargoyles stretch from the eaves of the chancel. The lower courses of the north wall of the nave and a blocked doorway date from the 12th century, and a medieval cross slab is built into this wall. The remainder of the fabric of the nave is from the 13th century. The chancel dates from the 15th century and in its east wall is a Tudor three-light window. The vestry dates from the 20th century. The arcade consists of four rounded-headed arches on round piers. The south wall of the aisle has recesses for a tomb and for an aumbry, and there is an aumbry in the south wall of the chancel. The bowl of the font is Norman, supported on a 20th-century shaft. The stained glass in the west window dates from the 19th century. The single-manual organ was built in 1975 by Eric Mason of Bolton.

== External features ==
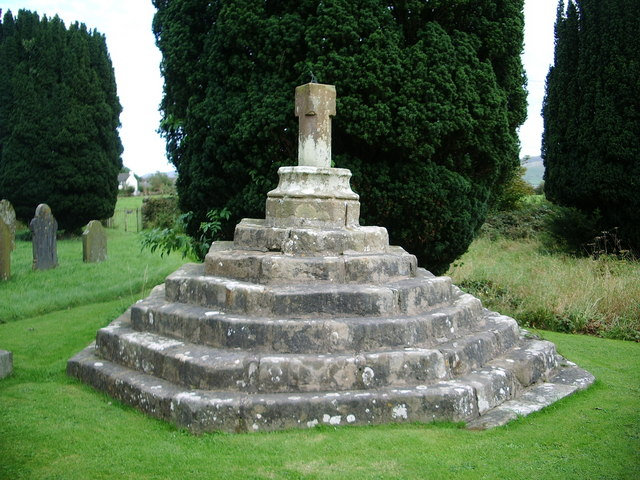
Preaching cross

In the churchyard is a preaching cross. Its base originated as a calvary dating from the medieval era. The cross dates probably from the 17th century and it carries a sundial dated 1825. It is constructed in calciferous sandstone and consists of seven octagonal steps on which is a cross base surmounted by the sundial, the brass plate of which is missing. It has been designated as a Grade II listed building. The cross is traditionally linked with Calder Abbey. It is a scheduled ancient monument.

== See also ==
- Grade I listed churches in Cumbria
- Listed buildings in Dean, Cumbria
