= Branthwaite =

Hamlet in Cumbria, England

Coordinates: 54.610°N 3.458°W

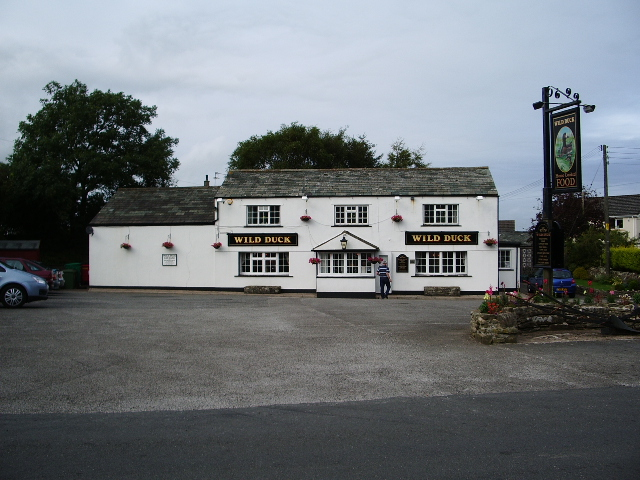
- The Wild Duck public house, Branthwaite

- Location in Allerdale, Cumbria Location within Cumbria
- OS grid reference: NY058248
- Civil parish: Dean
- Unitary authority: Cumberland
- Ceremonial county: Cumbria
- Region: North West
- Country: England
- Sovereign state: United Kingdom
- Post town: WORKINGTON
- Postcode district: CA14
- Dialling code: 01900
- Police: Cumbria
- Fire: Cumbria
- Ambulance: North West
- UK Parliament: Whitehaven and Workington

Branthwaite is a hamlet in Cumbria, England. The hamlet is approximately 5 mi (8 km) from Workington and 7 mi (11 km) from Cockermouth. It is located just outside the Lake District National Park. In 1870-72 the township had a population of 281.

== Amenities ==
Branthwaite has few amenities, there is one public house, The Wild Duck. The River Marron runs through Branthwaite. There is a former trout farm. There is also a former mill, which is now home to the local motor engineering business.

Branthwaite Hall is an old peel tower that is in between Branthwaite and Dean.

== Governance ==
Branthwaite is in the parliamentary constituency of Whitehaven and Workington.

For Local Government purposes it is in the Cumberland unitary authority area.

Branthwaite does not have its own parish council, instead it is part of Dean Parish Council, which also covers villages of Dean, Deanscales, Eaglesfield, Pardshaw and Ullock.

== Notable people ==
- Malcolm Wilson (born 1956), rally driver and rally-team owner
