= Workington Bridge railway station =

Disused railway station in Cumbria, England

Workington Bridge

General information
- Location: Workington (Northside), Cumberland; England
- Coordinates: 54.6474°N 3.5402°W
- Grid reference: NY007291
- Platforms: 2

Other information
- Status: Disused

History
- Original company: Cockermouth & Workington Railway
- Pre-grouping: London and North Western Railway
- Post-grouping: London, Midland and Scottish Railway

Key dates
- ? May 1847: Opened
- 1 January 1951: Closed
Location
- Location within the former Allerdale Borough Location within Cumbria

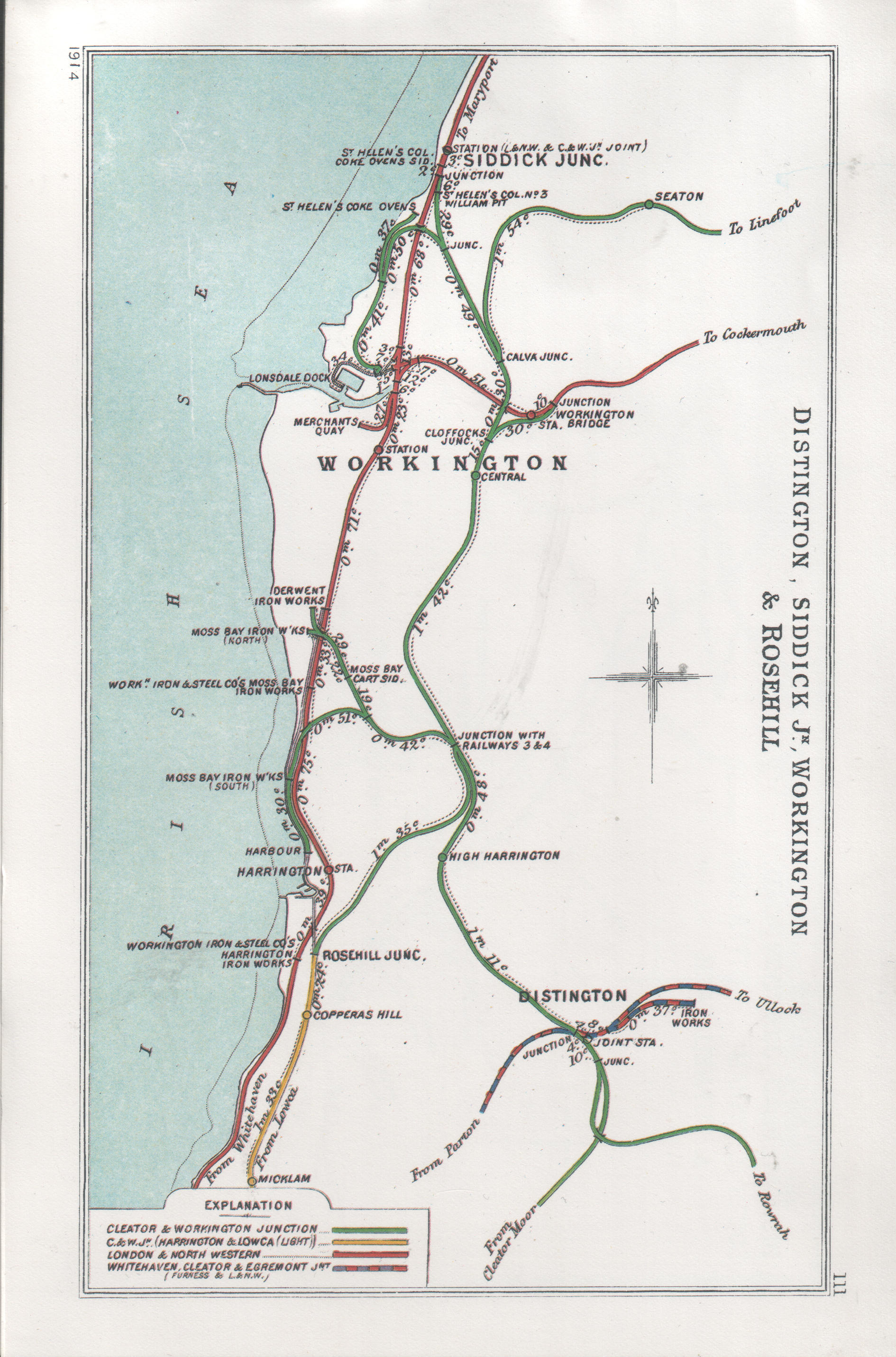
A 1914 Railway Clearing House Junction Diagram showing the complex network which existed in the Workington area

Workington Bridge railway station was situated at the northern end of Workington Bridge next to the River Derwent, and was originally served by the Cockermouth and Workington Railway, later absorbed by the London and North Western Railway; the road at the north end of the bridge having to be raised to allow the railway to pass under it. It served eastern Workington, Cumberland (now Cumbria), England.

== History ==
The railway opened on 27 April 1847, but did not originally include a station at Workington Bridge;the only intermediate stations were at Camerton and Brigham. Travellers to Workington were carried into the existing station on the coast line; this was convenient for the harbour, but, as a letter to a local paper promptly pointed out, this meant a long (uphill) trudge to the market place, which could be avoided if trains stopped to let down and pick passengers at the bridge. The suggestion was soon acted upon, a local paper in June 1847 containing the following paragraph:

We are glad to perceive that the letter which appeared in our columns about a month ago, addressed to the Directors of the Cockermouth and Workington Railway, pointing out the great accommodation to the public and the advantages to the company by the establishing of a station at the bridge, near Workington, has had the desired effect. The trains now stop daily at the bridge, where passengers can be booked whether intending to proceed up or down the line. The arrangement is a good one, and we have no doubt but the company will be rewarded for having adopted it - both financially and in the good opinion of the public for having shown so prompt a willingness to meet their wishes

The station closed completely on 1 January 1951.

== Afterlife ==
By 2015 the station site was obliterated. The bridge which gave the station its name had been rebuilt and had assumed greater importance after it and several neighbours were condemned or destroyed in the 2009 Workington floods.

Preceding station	Disused railways	Following station
Camerton; Line and station closed	London and North Western Railway; Cockermouth & Workington Railway	Workington Main on Cumbrian Coast Line

== See also ==
- Cockermouth, Keswick and Penrith Railway
