= Cumberland Pacquet =

British newspaper active 1774–1896

Cumberland Pacquet, and Ware's Whitehaven Advertiser
- Type: Weekly
- Format: Broadsheet
- Founded: 1774
- Ceased publication: 31 December 1896
- Language: English
- Headquarters: Whitehaven, Cumberland, UK

The Cumberland Pacquet, and Ware's Whitehaven Advertiser was a regional British broadsheet newspaper which was published in Whitehaven, Cumberland, between 1774 and 31 December 1896. The paper was founded by Robert Gibson, and its age made it for some time the oldest newspaper published in the country of Cumberland.
