= St Michael, Lamplugh =

Coordinates: 54.5741°N 3.41149°W

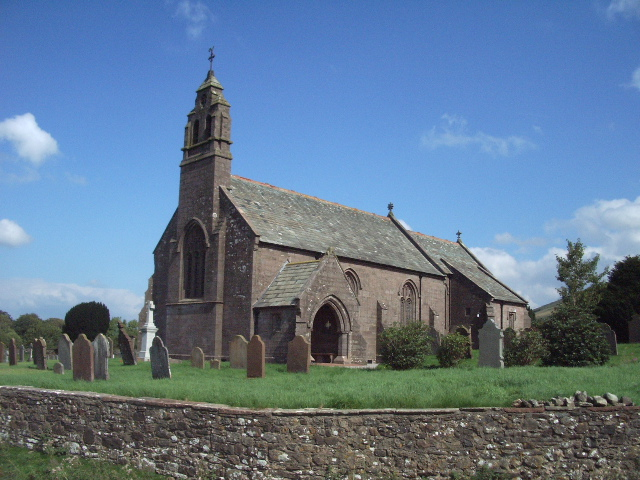
- St Michael, Lamplugh

- Location in Cumbria
- ,
- OS grid reference: NY 0885320799
- Location: Lamplugh, Cumbria
- Country: England
- Denomination: Anglican

History
- Status: Parish church
- Dedication: St Michael

Administration
- Province: York
- Diocese: Carlisle
- Archdeaconry: West Cumberland
- Deanery: Calder
- Parish: Lamplugh

Clergy
- Vicar: Revd Ian Parker

St Michael is in Lamplugh, Cumbria, England. It is an active Anglican parish church in the deanery of Calder, and the diocese of Carlisle. Its benefice is Lamplugh, Kirkland & Ennerdale. The church is a Grade II listed building.

== History ==
St Michael, Lamplugh was built by William Butterfield in 1870 with some mediaeval features retained. A chapel or church is believed to have been on the site since 1150 with two previous reconstructions recorded in 1658 and 1771. The vestry was previously part of the Lamplugh family mortuary chapel.

The bellcote houses two bells; one has been dated to the 15th century, the other dates from 1870 and was cast by John Taylor & Co of Loughborough. Some mediaeval features were retained: a doorway in the north chancel wall now blocked, though delineated externally by an 18th-century monument; the remodelled chancel and vestry, the latter with an original cusped window and door; and three gargoyles relocated to the external east wall. Pevsner claims that the Perpendicular style adopted by Butterfield is unusual for the date and must have reflected the earlier building. The walls are of sandstone with ashlar details; the roof is of slate.

Two of the windows are by Charles Eamer Kempe (1891 and 1901) and two are from the Kempe Tower workshop, Kempe & Co. Ltd., dated to 1910 and 1911. One, dated 1903, is by Heaton, Butler and Bayne of London and the other three are attributed to the London firm of Clayton and Bell. An Honours Board, which commemorates all those from the parish who served in World War I, having been researched by the Lamplugh and District Heritage Society was erected by the Society in November 2018.

== Architecture ==
St Michael, Lamplugh is built of local sandstone. The walls are coursed, squared rubble on chamfered plinth with stepped buttressing. The graduated slate roofs with stone copings and kneelers; bellcote at west end, apex crosses to east. There is an aisleless nave and chancel with vestry on south side. The hour-bay nave has plank inner door, with pointed head, to a gabled south porch. The Perpendicular fenestration with vestry door and cusped, single-light window are original. The Perpendicular features are re-used, as are the three gargoyles over the east window and the blocked doorway, infilled with late 18th-century Dickinson Sons memorial on the north side of the chancel.

The roof has a scissors truss to the nave, with wide, pointed chancel and vestry arches with a traceried, four-centred opening above the chancel arch. The octagonal wooden pulpit in the north-east corner of the nave and the red octagonal stone font at the west end are 19th century. Mid 17th-century tomb slab with extensive, but weathered, inscription set against west wall in vestry; early 18th-century pedimented marble memorials in west nave wall. The altar has Christogram IHS. Chancel ceiling is blue. Organ The church also has a separate toilet and washroom.

The church has two war graves: one from World War I: J.E. Sewell, aged 19 (d. 12.6.1918), and one from World War II: J. Benn, aged 22 (d. 4.11.1943). The war memorial, immediately to the west of the church, unveiled and consecrated in June 1921, is inscribed with 30 names from World War I and four names from World War II.
