= Deanscales =

Hamlet in Cumbria, England

Coordinates: 54.625°N 3.405°W

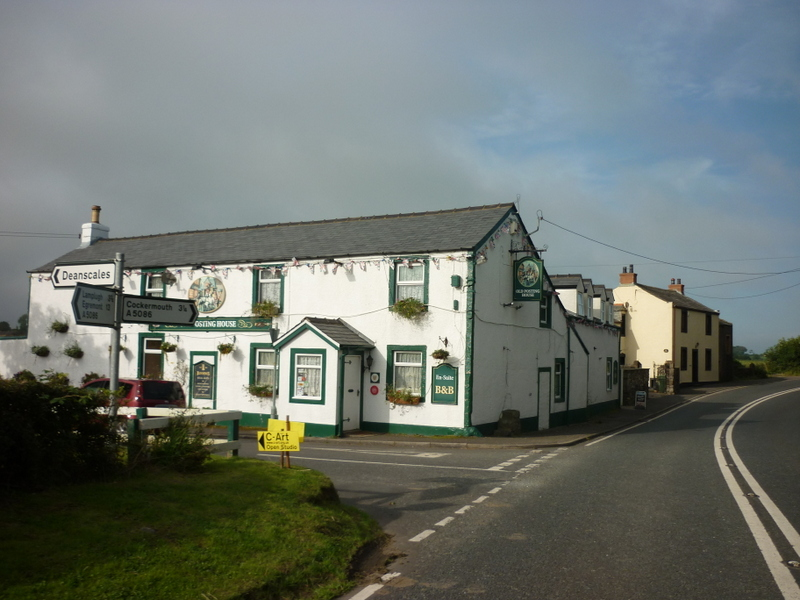
- The Old Posting House public house, Deanscales

- Location in Allerdale, Cumbria Location within Cumbria
- OS grid reference: NY092264
- Civil parish: Dean
- Unitary authority: Cumberland
- Ceremonial county: Cumbria
- Region: North West
- Country: England
- Sovereign state: United Kingdom
- Post town: COCKERMOUTH
- Postcode district: CA13
- Dialling code: 01900
- Police: Cumbria
- Fire: Cumbria
- Ambulance: North West
- UK Parliament: Whitehaven and Workington

Deanscales is a hamlet in the county of Cumbria, England. Nearby settlements include the village of Dean and the town of Cockermouth. Deanscales is on the A5086 road. Deanscales has 1 pub.

== See also ==
- Listed buildings in Dean, Cumbria
