= Bridgefoot =

Village in Cumbria, England

Coordinates: 54.648°N 3.465°W

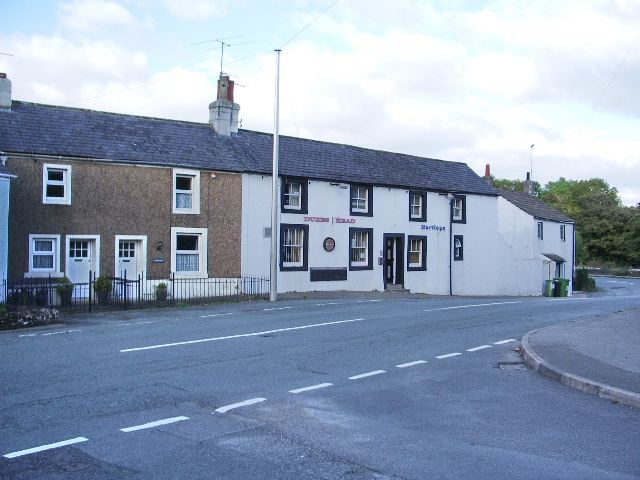
- The Dukes Head public house, Bridgefoot, now known as the Duke of Cumberland

- Location within Cumbria
- Population: <500
- OS grid reference: NY0529
- Civil parish: Greysouthen; Little Clifton
- Unitary authority: Cumberland
- Ceremonial county: Cumbria
- Region: North West
- Country: England
- Sovereign state: United Kingdom
- Post town: Workington
- Postcode district: CA14
- Dialling code: 01900
- Police: Cumbria
- Fire: Cumbria
- Ambulance: North West
- UK Parliament: Copeland

Bridgefoot is a village in Cumbria, historically part of Cumberland, near the Lake District National Park in England. It is situated at the confluence of the River Marron and Lostrigg Beck, approximately 1 mile south of the River Derwent. To the south it is seamlessly joined with the village of Little Clifton.

== Governance ==
Bridgefoot, is part of the Whitehaven and Workington constituency of the UK parliament.

For Local Government purposes it is in the Cumberland unitary authority area.

Bridgefoot has its own Parish Council; Greysouthen Parish Council.

== Transport ==
As of March 2026, 2 routes serve the village, both are run by Stagecoach, the 600 to Whitehaven or Carlisle via Wigton. The second route is the X5 to Workington or to Penrith via Cockermouth and Keswick.
