= Cockermouth and Workington Railway =

English railway company

The Cockermouth and Workington Railway was an English railway company, established by act of Parliament in 1845, which built and operated a railway between the Cumberland towns of Workington and Cockermouth. The railway opened for service in 1847, and ran from the Whitehaven Junction Railway station at Workington to a station at Cockermouth near the bridge over the Derwent. A single-tracked line of eight and a half miles length, its revenue came largely from the transport of coal from the pits of the lower Derwent valley to the port at Workington for shipment by sea. The Marron extension of the Whitehaven, Cleator and Egremont Railway and the Derwent Branch of the Maryport and Carlisle Railway were both constructed to link with the C&WR and together give an alternative route for the northward movement of haematite ore from the Cumberland ore-field. The completion of the Cockermouth, Keswick and Penrith Railway made the C&WR part of a continuous through route between South Durham and the Cumberland orefield. These developments both improved the potential profitability of the C&WR, and made control of it important to bigger companies wishing to maximise the iron-ore traffic over their lines: the C&WR was absorbed by the London and North Western Railway in 1866.

Goods traffic on the line ceased in 1964; passenger traffic in 1966. From just east of Bridgefoot to just short of the Papcastle roundabout, the modern A66 trunk road follows the alignment of the C&WR.

== History ==
=== Promotion, construction and opening ===
Cockermouth and Workington Railway Act 1845
- Act of Parliament
- Parliament of the United Kingdom
- Long title: An Act for making a Railway from the Market Town of Cockermouth to the Port and Harbour of Workington in the County of Cumberland.
- Citation: 8 & 9 Vict. c. cxx

Dates
- Royal assent: 21 July 1845

As early as 1837, a meeting had been called in Cockermouth to consider the construction of a railway to Workington; it was estimated that the line could be built for £7,000 a mile, and it was said that the coal and lime traffic on its route was already worth £4,000 a year and was bound to increase if the railway was built. Nothing came of this, but the project revived once the Whitehaven Junction Railway (WJR) had obtained its act of Parliament, the Whitehaven Junction Railway Act 1844 (7 & 8 Vict. c. lxiv): George Stephenson took a day out from surveying the line of the WJR to confirm that a railway between Cockermouth and Workington could be constructed cheaply and easily. In response to a prospectus issued locally, and without further advertising, the £80,000 capital was subscribed for by "parties resident within 20 miles". The prospectus promised a return of 8.5%, assuming the railway would increase traffic: a friendly local paper spoke of the traffic between Cockermouth and Workington being already £20,000 a year and hinted at a return of 17%. The Cockermouth and Workington Railway Act 1845 (8 & 9 Vict. c. cxx) was obtained; there was no opposition in committee, and royal assent was given on 21 July 1845 Ground was first broken 8 February 1846 (near Broughton Cross), and the line opened 27 April 1847.

The station at Cockermouth was on the south bank of, and close to the road bridge over, the River Derwent; the line ran westwards south of the Derwent and immediately north of Brigham and Broughton Cross, crossing the River Marron near its confluence with the Derwent. West of the Marron, the railway kept to the low ground of the flood plain of the Derwent, crossing and recrossing the Derwent five times, finally running along the north side of the Derwent to a junction with the Whitehaven Junction Railway just north of the latter's bridge over the Derwent; passenger trains ran over the WJR to reach Workington railway station (now joint between the C&WR and the WJR). The line was single track throughout, and all the bridges were built as timber trestles. Originally, there were intermediate stations at Brigham and at Camerton; additional stations were soon added at Broughton Cross and at Workington Bridge at the northern end of the road bridge over the Derwent (the latter station to remove the objection that travellers to the upper end of Workington were being carried past their ultimate destination on the opposite bank of the Derwent and then faced a 10-to-15-minute walk uphill from the WJR station.)

=== Operation: 'on the most economical principles' ===
Passenger trains (in 1854 four a day in both directions) were timetabled to connect with the service on the coast line; departures from Workington were "subject to irregularities in the Arrival of other Trains at Workington, for which the Cockermouth Trains will be detained" although this was noted to cause serious inconvenience: not until 1858 were there through trains (Cockermouth to Whitehaven May 1858, Cockermouth to Carlisle August 1858. The coal traffic was to use the WJR to reach the south bank of the Derwent, and then branch off to coal drops on the north side of Workington harbour. However, the railway was noted at the opening celebrations to be 'nearly finished': provisions for handling the mineral traffic were not yet in place, coal traffic only began in June 1847 and one of the three additional coal drops at Workington Harbour was still not completed in August 1848

The prospectus proved to have underestimated the cost of the railway, and overestimated its traffic, and hence revenue. By the first half of 1849 (when the harbour improvements were complete) the total capital expenditure on the railway was over £120,000 and the revenue from minerals traffic was only £1,484 from coals, £257 from lime. To improve the situation by attracting more coal traffic onto the line, the company obtained the Cockermouth and Workington Railway Act 1849 (12 & 13 Vict. c. xxxviii) to build a branch to Bridgefoot, but at a meeting to authorise issue of preference shares shareholders objected that the Bridgefoot branch was to run to one of the pits operated by Messrs Fletcher; it would be more seemly for the C&WR chairman (one of the Fletchers) to build the branch on his own account as a private siding, as another director (Jonathan Harris of Greysouthen) had done for his colliery ((giving what was subsequently referred to as the 'Marron siding'). (Note: or 'Marron branch'; not to be confused with the later 'Marron extension' of the Whitehaven Cleator and Egremont Railway to a junction with the C&WR near Bridgefoot. The coal-loading facility at the end of the siding was also referred to as Mr Harris's staith – the OED definition of staith as a facility for loading ships not being observed; a 'staith' in local usage (predating any specialised equipment for loading) being provided for storage of coal ready for shipment: the facilities for loading ships at Workington harbour were drops or hurrys. Similarly, whilst the lawyers of the Court of Common Pleas used colliery as a synonym for pit or mine, locally it normally (Note: see, for example, a paper presented by one of the Fletchers to the Cumberland and Westmorland Antiquarian and Archaeological Society)) meant a number of pits/mines working the same area, or under the same management; the 'Clifton Colliery' operated three distinct pits.) The meeting terminated in 'a sharp and personal discussion on the subject', and the branch was never built: the powers being allowed to lapse in 1854. (Note: The chairman and other individual members of the directorate were also involved with other railway companies with problems: the Cockermouth and Workington (Extension) Railway, and the Maryport and Carlisle Railway, where a shareholders' committee of investigation had explicitly criticised their actions, and the influence they had exerted on the setting of the rates for coal traffic: a subsequent attempted rebuttal of the M&CR report includes details of the rates charged on the C&WR: Mr Harris paid 3s 4d per waggon he sent from the Marron siding (4 3/4 miles (7.6 km) from Workington harbour); for the same distance Lord Lonsdale paid only 2s 3d per waggon; the Fletchers loaded coal at Broughton Cross (5 3/4 miles (9.3 km) from the harbour) and paid 4s 6d per waggon)

In response to lower than predicted traffic receipts, the line was run on 'the most economical principles': the salary of the secretary/manager was reduced, leading to the departure of the incumbent for the similar post with the Maryport and Carlisle and his replacement by a younger man acting as secretary/manager/engineer. (Note: The previous secretary (Henry Jacob) continued to attend shareholders' meetings and in 1853 was a member of the committee which approached the Whitehaven Junction Railway to discuss amalgamation) The Railway Times approved, noting 'altogether the economical management of this line is most satisfactory', (working expenses for the first half of 1852 were only 35% of receipts) but a comic novel of 1851 poked fun at the C&WR for having pursued economy to the point where all the platform staff were too young to shave, and passengers arrived covered in smuts because the locomotives were burning coal rather than coke. (The author, Henry Mayhew, clearly knew the area, but it is not clear how far his remarks were accurate reportage, how far exaggeration or comic invention) (Note: "the porters on the platform are ever playing at marbles or leapfrog" according to Mayhew, but the 1851 Census shows four Railway Porters in the Cockermouth area; they give their ages as 30, 31, 41 and 45. One of the reasons given for increased working expenses in 1854 was the increased price of coke.) In 1854 the Carlisle Journal spoke (lightly and in passing) of 'the risk of being capsized into the Derwent by the jolting of that most lopsided of all railways, the Cockermouth and Workington line'.

=== Adversity, dissatisfaction, and recriminations (1854–1859) ===
In 1853, the C&WR (which had been disrupted by floods and damage to bridges in the previous winter) approached the Whitehaven Junction to discuss amalgamation, but was rebuffed by the WJR. Over the three and a half years up to the end of 1851, the dividend on the C&WR's shares (nominal value £20) amounted to 25s 3d; a return of 1.8% a year. In the first half of 1853, the C&WR's traffic was declining, the directors were unable to recommend a half-year dividend any greater than two shillings (1% a year) and some shareholders thought even this imprudent as it left almost nothing in the contingency fund. The market price for C&WR shares was reported to be £8 12s.

In 1854, an attempt by the former chairman to reduce the number of directors revealed tensions between those who felt the company was being run by and for 'the coal interest', and the mine-owners who thought not enough was being done to assist them. The Fletchers had recently opened a new mine at Crossbarrow (west of Bridgefoot); coal raised there was now being carted direct to Workington harbour rather than (as initially) to the Marron siding. An 'anti-coal' critic saw this as a ploy to secure a favourable price for rail transport and another instance of the Fletchers wanting everything their own way. The problem, retorted the Fletchers (complaining of 'vague innuendos and underhand detraction'), was not price, although they were unhappy to be charged more than Lord Lonsdale for rail transport from the Marron siding; Mr Harris was now asking a prohibitive toll for access to his staith because he thought the provision of waggons and of ship-loading facilities at Workington inadequate for the existing coal trade. The Fletchers supported this criticism, but their complaint at the dilapidated state of the company's plant, and in particular the coal waggons, was met by the company secretary with the assertion that the problem was not with the waggons, but with the Fletchers' habitual overloading of them. A correspondence war then ensued between the Fletchers and the company secretary (who defended the actions of the company and contradicted the Fletchers seriatim, only to be contradicted in his turn and accused of 'slanderous fabrication'). The original 'anti-coal' critic also spelled out his discontent: the line had only been built because the coal interest had deliberately overstated the likely traffic. The coal traffic was under half that promised, but because of mismanagement the line had cost one-third more than it should have. Carriage rates for coal had been set too low, with the result that the colliery owners kept their pits open and made large profits, whilst the ordinary C&WR shareholder had lost three-quarters of their money.

More coal waggons were bought and the loading facilities at Workington harbour increased and the Fletchers reverted to rail transport of their coal, but in 1856, faced with an increased carriage rate, again threatened to remove their custom. They were now in a far stronger position; they were now leasing Lord Lonsdale's pits at Clifton, so pits they were working accounted for nearly half the revenue of the line. Furthermore, Lord Lonsdale had indicated that if the C&WR's rates hindered exploitation of his mineral rights (which now included the Crossbarrow pit) the Fletchers should negotiate a lower rate; if the C&WR were unreasonable he was prepared to build and lease a waggonway/railway direct from the pits to Workington harbour. This was supported by Lord Lonsdale giving notice of a parliamentary bill for construction of the waggonway. Despite a flurry of pseudonymous letters in the Cumberland Pacquet (Note: another pseudonymous correspondent pointed out that the letters had a common literary style, and that style was much like that of Mr Dodds, the recently discharged secretary/manager of the C&WR.) denouncing dictation by the 'coal interest', the C&WR board acceded to Fletchers' demands, reducing the rate per waggon from 3s10d to 2s6d. (Note: From before 1750 to 1781, the Lowthers had extracted about two million tonnes of coal in the Clifton area, transporting it to Workington harbour by a 'wooden railway'. Hence, although the colliery had been abruptly shutdown in 1781 by Sir James Lowther(later the first Earl of Lonsdale), the current Earl probably did not need an act of Parliament in order to build the waggonway: most of the land along the proposed route was already Lowther-owned and for the short section that was not, no difficulty was foreseen in obtaining a way-leave. However the letters in the Pacquet (a Whitehaven newspaper normally thought a Lowther mouthpiece) had repeatedly poured scorn on the feasibility and profitability of the waggonway and on the idea that Lord Lonsdale would do anything contrary to the interests of the C&WR (in which he was a shareholder); notice of the intended bill usefully clarified the situation.)

It had been the unanimous decision of the board in May 1856 that the company secretary/manager (John Dodds) should be 'allowed to resign' (Dodds worked out his notice, but responsibility for engines and rolling stock was immediately assumed by George Tosh, who had (and retained) the same responsibility on the Maryport and Carlisle). The company half-yearly meeting in February 1857 was the first after Mr Dodds' departure, and the report to shareholders contained multiple criticisms of his regime.

Accounts had been defectively kept; expenditure had not been booked as it was incurred, and there had been 'inaccuracy and confusion' in the stores accounts. (Note: Dodds pointed out this was not unknown elsewhere; the M&CR auditors had in the past complained about imprecision in Mr Tosh's estimation of stock in hand. A director then restated the matter in greater detail and more pointedly: Dodds' estimates of the value of spares were clearly nonsense – the purported increase in value of spares between December 1855 and June 1856 exceeded by a considerable margin the total value of spares purchased in those six months. Since no records had been kept of stores and liabilities had not been charged as they arose 'a person might just present almost what kind of account he liked by operating on the stores accounts and the liabilities'.) Mr Tosh had found the engines to need much remedial work, they being 'in a most dilapidated state from long neglect'. A new tank engine built to Dodds' specification had proved wholly unsuited for the traffic. (Note: It had come off the line and broken its frame - because it could not negotiate the curves on the line (and the tighter ones on private sidings) according to Tosh. Dodds countered that two identical engines were working satisfactorily on the Peebles Railway; the problem was not with the engine but with the poor state of the permanent way, and the blame for that lay not with him, but with the directors for not allowing him money to maintain the permanent way. The two identical engines would appear to be the St Ronans and the Tweed, a pair of 2-4-0 tank engines. If so, it seems relevant that the Wikipedia article on the Peebles Railway reports (without, unfortunately, an obvious supporting reference) 'Soon after the opening, one of the locomotives St Ronans became defective "because it could not negotiate the curves on the track"' However, it should also be noted that at the C&WR's August 1857 half-yearly meeting it was reported that nearly all the curves on the line had been relaid with new sleepers) Dodds defended himself by attacking the competence of Mr Tosh (who could not reply, because not a shareholder) and alleging that the stores accounts for the last half-year had been wilfully falsified. "Under the existing management the property of the company was being wasted, four-fifths of the money expended during the last half-year was altogether unnecessary, and the directors were not deserving the confidence of the shareholders." Acceptance of the half-yearly report and accounts was opposed by Dodds, supported both by the 'anti-coal interest' faction and by Mr Harris (who had been denied any reduction in rates to match that given the Fletchers), and only carried on the casting vote of the chairman (Mr Fletcher).

In March 1857, a special train carried the Conservative candidates for the forthcoming election at Cockermouth (and about three hundred of their supporters) to their nomination meeting. The C&WR's passenger engine was undergoing repairs, and instead the Cocker goods engine was used. Tosh had recently modified this from an 0-4-2 to an 0-4-0 to better enable it to negotiate the curves in the coal sidings; as with engines he had similarly modified on the M&CR he had advised caution in its use. On the return journey from Cockermouth, when crossing the Stainburn viaduct, the engine developed oscillations which spread the track, and the train derailed (but fortunately did not leave the track until back on dry land; only the fireman, and the company secretary (who was on the footplate) were seriously injured). The subsequent report by Captain Tyler of the Railway Inspectorate identified multiple failings: the viaduct was too flexible (because of too light a construction), and a skew one, which encouraged oscillation of the engine, the short wheelbase of the modified engine allowed the oscillations to be violent, and the permanent way insufficiently robust (both as built, and even more so after a failure to adequately maintain it) to withstand the oscillation. The copy of Captain Tyler's report sent to the C&WR was accompanied by the comment "My Lords direct me to observe, that it appears from this report that the accident in question was entirely due to the employment of a defectively-constructed engine upon a bad road, and that therefore serious blame is to be attributed to those in whom the management of the railway is vested"

Dodds returned to the attack against the board at the August 1857 half-yearly meeting, but this time received much less support. (Note: The Pacquet printed one more letter from him, written from Southport in August 1857, which alleged that "the books, the published accounts, and the directors' reports, since 30 June 1856, are false and fictitious": in February 1858 (following a change of proprietor in January 1858) it told its readers it had received a letter on the C&WR's affairs signed "A Shareholder" but would not print it: the issue of freight rates had been settled by the recent law case, and the other issues raised 'involve charges of a serious nature and language is used which we are not in a position to say we could justify' In 1858 Dodds became superintendent of the Newry, Warrenpoint and Rostrevor Railway)

Meanwhile, Mr Harris had sought an injunction against the C&WR under the Railway and Canal Traffic Act 1854 (17 & 18 Vict. c. 31), which forbade railway companies giving an 'undue or unreasonable preference' to any person or company. The Court of Common Pleas gave him his injunction in January 1858: the threat of losing the Fletchers' traffic was not a valid reason for charging them a lower rate than that charged to Mr Harris. (Note: One of the judges noted that any railway authorised by an act of Parliament was subject to the 1854 act; had Lord Lonsdale gone ahead with the waggonway by act of Parliament Mr Harris would have been entitled to demand it carry his coal at the same rate as the Fletchers': if the threat justified a lower rate for the Fletchers, it also justified a lower rate for Mr Harris.) Mr Harris then joined the board, which announced a unanimous decision to set up a committee (five members, all unconnected with the coal trade) to revise the rates charged – including those agreed with Messrs Fletcher, should the committee feel justified in interfering (counsel would be consulted first). The revising committee arrived at new rates to come into effect at the start of March 1858, but they included an increased rate for the Fletchers, proposed without any legal advice on whether the existing agreement with them could be set aside. Fletchers refused to go beyond the rates for which they had an agreement they considered legal and legally arrived at; the board (who considered a proposed charge for the C&WR operating on the Fletchers' private sidings to be contrary to the company's act) refused to enforce the revised rates unless the committee produced supporting legal advice. (Note: The committee chairman (John Musgrave, a Whitehaven solicitor, and solicitor to the Whitehaven, Cleator and Egremont Railway) argued that rather than the committee seeking legal advice before making its recommendations, the company should instruct its solicitor to seek advice once the recommendations had been made: a good first step would be for it to appoint a company solicitor. (Both the then chairman John Steel MP and the vice-chairman (Edward Waugh) had practised as solicitors; it was Mr Waugh who advised that siding charges were ultra vires))

=== Better times ===
There the matter rested: Whellan's The History and topography of the counties of Cumberland and Westmorland of 1860 noted Mr Harris to have a single pit at Bridgefoot employing about 70 men; the Fletchers' Clifton Colliery employed 600 hands, could raise up to 800 tons of coal a day and "the Workington harbour and the Cockermouth and Workington railway are both chiefly dependent for their revenue upon the Clifton Colliery". (Note: Mr Harris had pits elsewhere (at Maryport and at Aspatria), but they did not put traffic onto the C&WR. In 1860, the C&WR chairman said in a justification of the agreement, revenue from the Clifton Colliery traffic was 'almost £6,000' at a freight charge of 2s 6d per 3-ton waggon, which would imply an average output of about 450 tons a day (and confirm the dependency). The Clifton Colliery shipped nearly 80,000 tons a year out of Workington in 1860 (out of a total of 136,000 tons shipped)) The prosperity and prospects of the C&WR were improving; respectable dividends were beginning to be paid (and in 1858, shareholders finally agreed to a regular allowance for depreciation being set against gross revenue, 2.5% of which was paid to a sinking fund) and an extension to Penrith to meet the Eden Valley line was being talked of. Prosperity took most of the heat out of the issue: when, in 1860, a dividend of 4.5% a year was declared by the C&WR the fiercest critic of the influence of the 'coal interest' was of his own opinion still, but willing to let bygones be bygones. (Nonetheless, there were rancorous exchanges at a shareholders' meeting in 1863 when two non-coal directors were elected to the board by the exercise of proxies.)

All engines were converted to coal-burning at the end of 1858. In response to the 1857 accident, track on bridges was relaid with bridge rails, and it was decided to rebuild bridges as stone-and-iron structures as funds permitted. The total cost of replacing all the bridges was initially estimated as £6,000 to £6,500; but the final cost was about three times this, most of which was borrowed against personal guarantees by the directors; the C&WR then raised the money by the issue of additional shares, authorised by the Cockermouth and Workington Railway Act 1863 (26 & 27 Vict. c. xlii) which also authorised connection to Lord Lonsdale's dock at Workington, and construction of a number of passing loops.

=== Improved prospects ===
The prospects of the C&WR were significantly improved by the actions of others: the improvement of port facilities at Workington and the construction of railways whose connection with the C&WR changed it from being an insignificant dead-end branch to a link in through routes for the exploitation of the haematite ore-field a few miles south of the Derwent

==== Workington Dock ====
Workington Dock Act 1861
- Act of Parliament
- Parliament of the United Kingdom
- Long title: An Act to enable the Bight Honourable William Earl of Lonsdale to make and maintain a Dock or Tidal Basin at Workington in the County of Cumberland, and a Railway therefrom to join the Whitehaven Junction Railway; and for other Purposes.
- Citation: 24 & 25 Vict. c. lxxxiii

Dates
- Royal assent: 28 June 1861

Other legislation
- Repealed by: Workington Harbour and Dock (Transfer) Act 1957

Status: Repealed

Workington Wet Dock Act 1863
- Act of Parliament
- Parliament of the United Kingdom
- Long title: An Act to enable the Right Honourable William Earl of Lonsdale to make and maintain a Wet Dock at Workington in the County of Cumberland, and a Railway therefrom to join the Whitehaven Junction Railway, in lieu of the Dock or Tidal Basin and Railway authorized by "The Workington Dock Act, 1861;" and for other Purposes.
- Citation: 26 & 27 Vict. c. xvi

Dates
- Royal assent: 11 May 1863

Other legislation
- Repealed by: Workington Harbour and Dock (Transfer) Act 1957

Status: Repealed

In 1860, one of the Fletchers wrote on behalf of local coal- and iron-masters to the Workington Harbour trustees calling for a wet-dock at Workington to accommodate the growing traffic from local industry (and the expected increase in traffic from the proposed Penrith-Cockermouth and Lamplugh-Bridgefoot rail links) and to combat the loss of trade to the newly opened wet dock at Maryport. The trustees consulted John Hawkshaw, who reported that the subsoil on both sides of the Derwent was gravel and sand, and consequently construction of a wet dock was beyond the trustees' means. Lord Lonsdale then offered to build a tidal dock north of the river at his own expense (in return for half of the revenue from it). (Note: The dock was designed by Alexander Meadows Rendel) Having obtained the Workington Dock Act 1861 (24 & 25 Vict. c. lxxxiii) for a tidal dock, then, with construction of the dock well under way, Lord Lonsdale secured the Workington Wet Dock Act 1863 (26 & 27 Vict. c. xvi) authorising its operation as a wet dock; the first coal shipment from the new Lonsdale Dock (120 tons from the Clifton Colliery) took place in September 1864.

==== Connection to the West Coast Main Line ====
The Cockermouth, Keswick and Penrith Railway (CK&PR) had its immediate origins in a meeting at Keswick in September 1860 which agreed to promote a railway linking Keswick to existing railways at Cockermouth (to the West) and Penrith (to the East). A project for a railway linking the towns had been promoted during the Railway Mania, getting as far as a survey of the proposed route, but nothing had come of this (nor of a projected railway from Cockermouth to Windermere via Keswick). However, the prospectus for the company argued, what would make the line profitable was not local traffic to Keswick, but potential two-way mineral traffic between the haematite orefield of West Cumberland and the coke-ovens of South Durham.

The project was supported by the London and North Western Railway (LNWR) (whose line would be joined at Penrith), and by the Stockton and Darlington Railway which had been behind a series of lines engineered by Thomas Bouch which together gave access from South Durham to the West Coast Main Line at Clifton just south of Penrith. Many C&WR directors were active in the promotion of the CK&PR and sat on its board. The CK&PR's bill was initially to have provided for the C&WR taking a stake in the Cockermouth, Keswick and Penrith Railway, but this clause was withdrawn after Lord Lonsdale indicated that it would lead him to oppose the bill. The bill was then unopposed, and the resulting Cockermouth, Keswick and Penrith Railway Act 1861 (24 & 25 Vict. c. cciii) received its royal assent in August 1861. The CK&PR's further bill of 1863, allowing the LNWR and the Stockton and Darlington to subscribe to shares in the CK&PR, also authorised these companies (jointly or separately) to reach agreement with the C&WR on the operation and management of the C&WR. Connection with the CK&PR was made by a new line leaving the existing line just to the west of the original Cockermouth station and meeting the CK&PR at a new joint passenger station to the south of the town (the old C&WR station became a joint goods station). Mineral traffic began running over the CK&PR in late autumn 1864; passenger services on the CK&PR began (and C&WR passenger trains ran to the new station at Cockermouth) in January 1865.

==== Connection to the haematite ore-field ====
The Whitehaven, Cleator and Egremont Railway sought an act of Parliament in 1863 to extend its line from Lamplugh to a junction with the C&W near Bridgefoot: its "Marron extension". The Marron extension gave a route northwards for haematite ore independent of the Whitehaven and Furness Junction Railway's tunnel at Whitehaven, which was a traffic bottleneck (and one for which a heavy toll of 9d per ton was charged). Objectors to the bill drew attention to the high mileage rates charged by the WC&ER and claimed the extension was being promoted primarily to protect the WC&ER's monopoly by preventing other companies (such as the C&WR) accessing the orefield, but the WC&ER got the Whitehaven, Cleator and Egremont Railway Act 1863 (26 & 27 Vict. c. lxiv). The C&WR then gained two directors associated with the WC&ER, added against the wishes of the board by proxies held by the solicitor of the WC&ER (already a director of the C&WR). This election was accompanied by a renewal of previous rhetoric on the undue influence on the affairs of the C&WR of directors associated with the Clifton Colliery (one of the new directors had been proprietor of the Cumberland Pacquet whilst it had been outspoken on this). However this led to counter-charges of hypocrisy: the WC&ER was similarly dominated by its major customer, the Parkside mine at Frizington, with which the new directors (and the WC&ER's solicitor) were associated. There were obvious motives for the WC&ER seeking C&WR directorships; the C&WR's act allowed it to charge tolls at up to 5d per ton per mile, so an uncooperative C&WR could choke off traffic over the WC&ER's Marron extension. However the new directors were also closely associated with the 'Castle' (pro-Lowther) faction in Whitehaven politics, and with the Solway Junction Railway; it was later suggested that their election had been intended to pave the way for the lease of the C&WR by the WJR (which they supported and the WC&ER opposed). Mineral traffic over the Marron extension began 15 January 1866, it being claimed that it reduced carriage costs by 1s 6d per ton, compared to the route via Whitehaven:.

=== Merger proposals ===
By 1864 revenue from the existing traffic (i.e. without benefit of the new dock or the new connections to the C&WR) supported a 6% annual dividend. C&WR £20 shares were now being quoted at £36 to £40 but this was partly due to a widespread expectation that the new connections would lead to a takeover. In the spring of 1864, the Whitehaven Junction Railway (WJR), which had repeatedly rebuffed past offers of a lease of the C&WR, offered to lease the line, guaranteeing an 8% annual dividend to C&WR shareholders. The C&WR directors asked instead for either a flat 10% guaranteed or 8% guaranteed but dividends to match any dividend greater than 8% on WJR shares. The WJR were not prepared to offer those terms. However, in October 1864 they were, it being understood that the LNWR and the North Eastern Railway (which had absorbed the Stockton and Darlington) had offered to jointly lease the C&WR at an 8% guaranteed dividend.

Following the rejection of the Whitehaven Junction's attempt to lease the C&WR in the spring of 1864, and the passage of the Solway Junction Railway Act 1864 (27 & 28 Vict. c. clviii) in June 1864, the Maryport and Carlisle Railway (M&CR) had announced its intention to build a branch from its main line to the C&WR. This 'Derwent branch' was to run from a junction with the M&CR main line at Bullgill to Brigham on the C&WR, about two miles east of Marron Junction. and would give a route from the orefield to Scotland independent of the WJR; it also filled an obvious gap between the WC&ER and the Solway Junction which if filled by either of those companies in the future, would give a route from the orefield to Scotland independent of the M&CR. (Note: One of the witnesses in favour of the SJR's Bill had been James Dees, a partner in the Parkside mines at Frizington and a director of two short local lines (the WC&ER and the C&WR) - also a future director of the SJR.)

Faced with the proposed lease of the C&WR by the Whitehaven Junction, and aware that larger railway networks from outside the area were also showing an interest, in 1865 the M&CR sought to protect its interests by promoting a parliamentary bill to amalgamate with or lease five local companies. That found no support from the other companies and did not proceed. The M&CR's bill for construction of its Derwent branch was heard in direct competition with the Whitehaven Junction's bill to lease the C&WR; the WJR's bill (opposed by both the M&CR and the WC&ER as an obvious attempt to block traffic between them) was rejected, but the M&CR's Derwent branch was authorised on 19 June 1865.

London and North-western Railway (Cockermouth and Workington Railway Transfer) Act 1866
- Act of Parliament
- Parliament of the United Kingdom
- Long title: An Act for vesting the Undertaking of the Cockermouth and Workington Railway Company in the London and North-western Railway Company; and for other Purposes.
- Citation: 29 & 30 Vict. c. clxxxix

Dates
- Royal assent: 16 July 1866

Text of statute as originally enacted

The Whitehaven Junction Railway then accepted an offer from the LNWR to be leased for a guaranteed 10% dividend: the Whitehaven and Furness Junction Railway was similarly leased by the Furness Railway at a guaranteed dividend of 8%. The LNWR then offered to lease the C&WR for a guaranteed dividend of 7% increasing at 1% per year to 10% from January 1870 onwards. The offer was accepted by the shareholders, wihh the LNWR (unlike the WJR) granting the Maryport and Carlisle running powers from Brigham to Cockermouth and to Marron Junction, and reaching agreement with the WC&ER on 'powers as to running and tolls') the requisite act, the London and North-western Railway (Cockermouth and Workington Railway Transfer) Act 1866 (29 & 30 Vict. c. clxxxix) was unopposed in Parliament, receiving its royal assent on 23 July 1866, as did the amalgamation acts for the WJR and the W&FJR.

=== Post-amalgamation history ===
The LNWR then set about doubling the line, which remained under LNWR management until absorbed on 1 January 1923 into the London, Midland and Scottish Railway (LM&SR) and in 1948 into the nationalised British Railways. Goods traffic ceased in 1964 and the line closed to passenger traffic in 1966.

== Route ==
Cockermouth (until 1865 the original station near the bridge over the Derwent handled both passengers and goods, from 1865 onwards passenger services ran to a new joint passenger station shared with the Cockermouth, Keswick and Penrith Railway) – Brigham – Broughton Cross – Camerton – Workington Bridge – Workington (later known as "Workington LNWR" ("Workington Main" after grouping in 1923) to distinguish it from the (now closed) "Workington Central" station on the Cleator and Workington Junction Railway

== See also ==
- Cumbrian Coast Line (history)
- Cockermouth, Keswick and Penrith Railway
