= River Marron =

River in Cumbria, England

Coordinates: 54.6592°N 3.4618°W

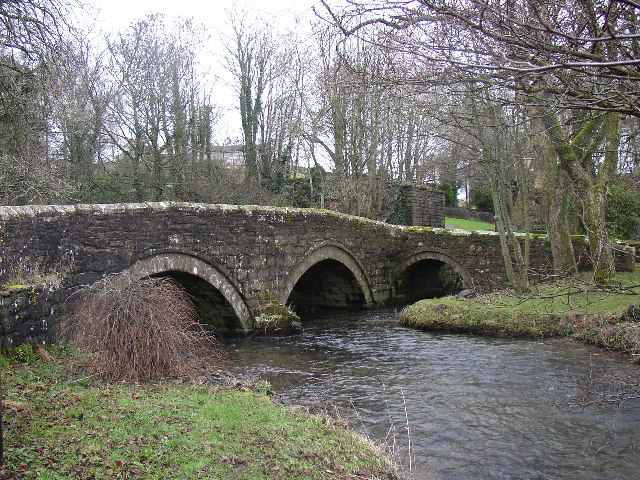
River Marron at Ullock Bridge

The River Marron is a river of Cumbria, England.

Rising near the village of Asby, Copeland at the confluence of Colliergate Beck and Scallow Beck, the Marron travels north past Ullock and Branthwaite, picking up the waters of Lostrigg Beck at Little Clifton/Bridgefoot shortly before joining the River Derwent.
