= Camerton railway station (Cumberland) =

Disused railway station in Cumbria, England

Camerton
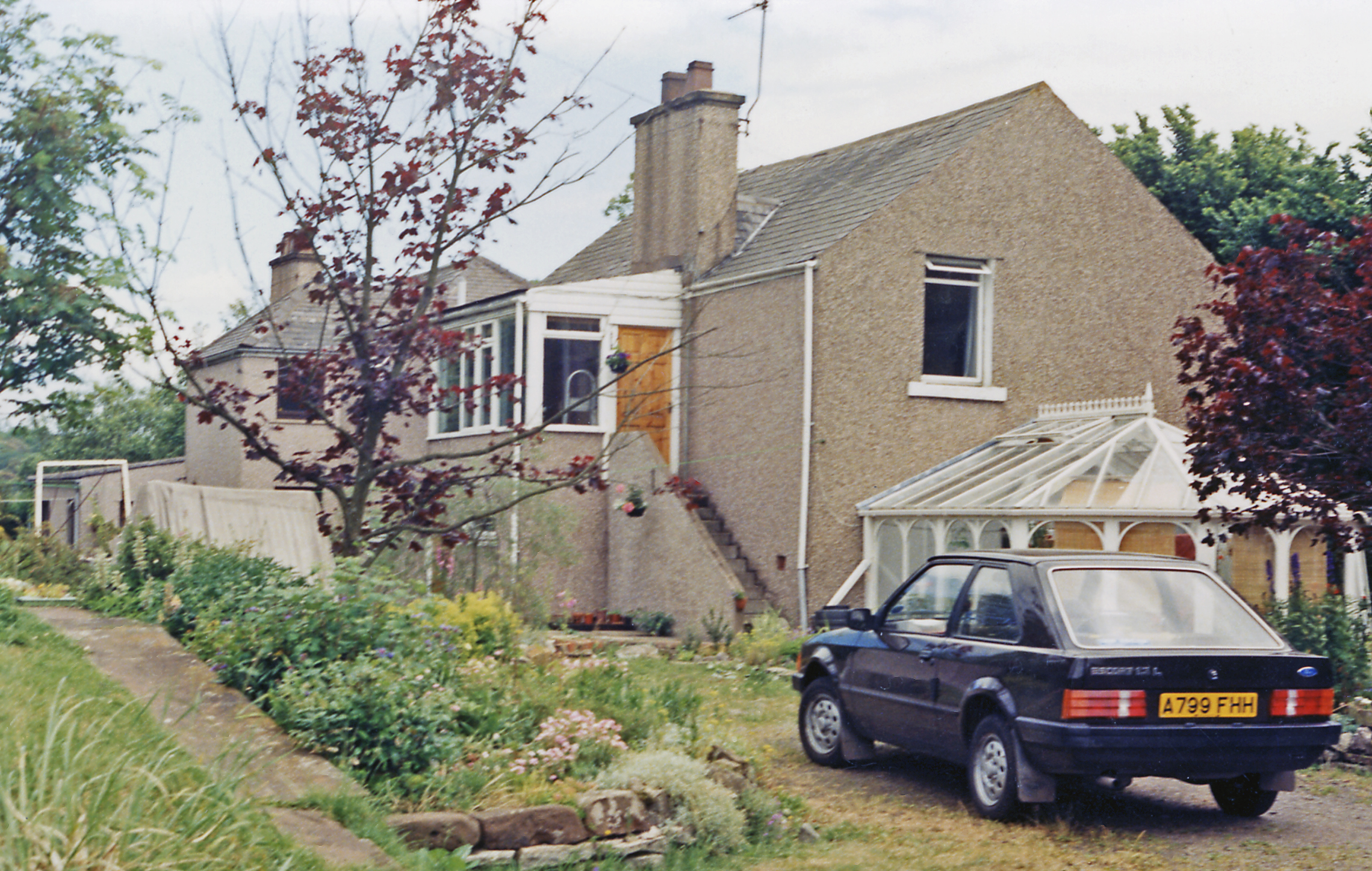
- The site of the station in 1986

General information
- Location: Camerton, Cumberland; England
- Coordinates: 54.66038°N 3.49493°W
- Grid reference: NY036305
- Platforms: 2

Other information
- Status: Disused

History
- Original company: Cockermouth and Workington Railway
- Pre-grouping: London and North Western Railway
- Post-grouping: London, Midland and Scottish Railway

Key dates
- 28 April 1847: Opened
- 3 March 1952: Closed to passengers
- 18 April 1966: Closed completely
Location

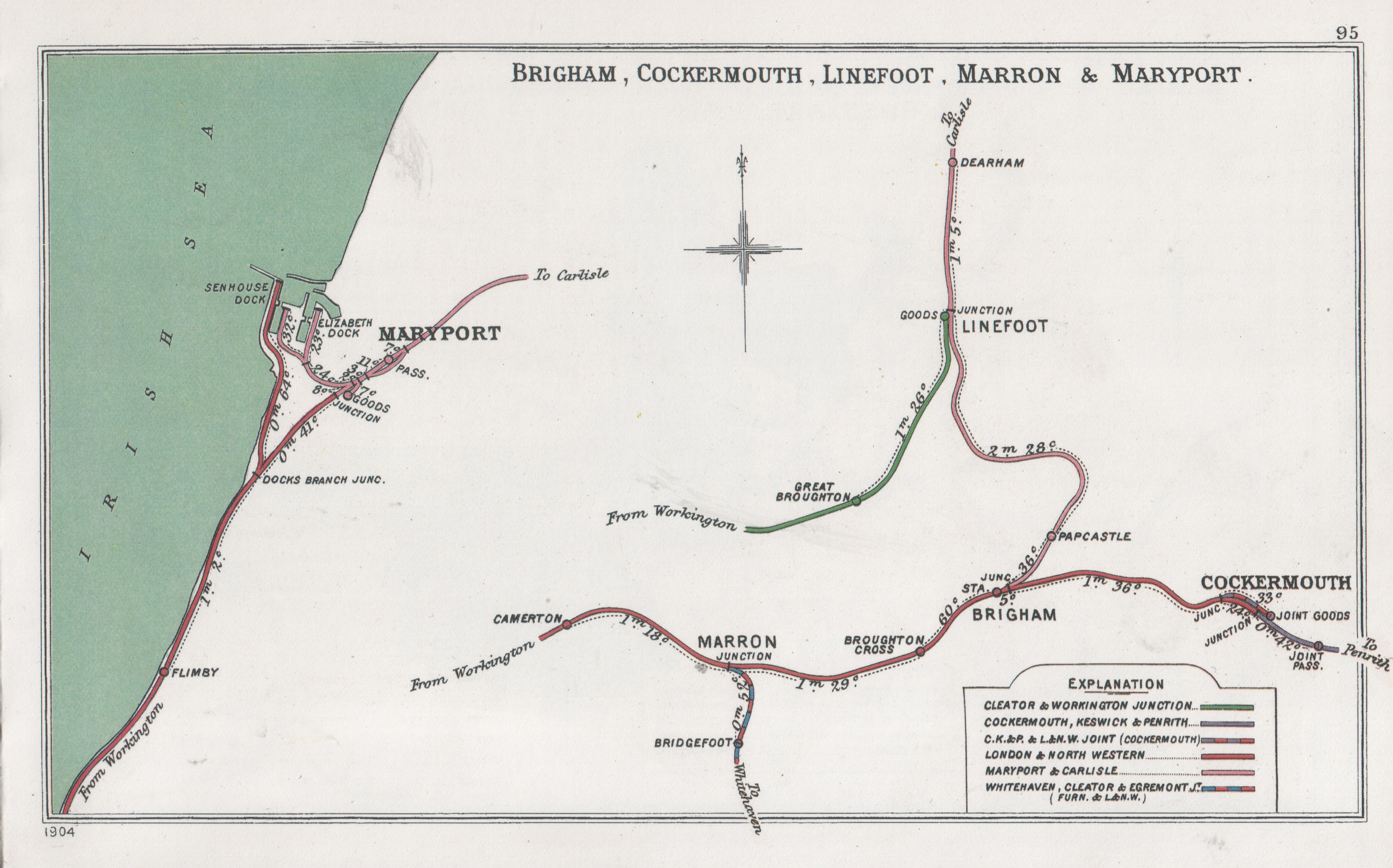
A 1904 Railway Clearing House Junction Diagram showing (right) railways in the vicinity of the station

Camerton railway station was situated next to the River Derwent on the Cockermouth and Workington Railway. It served the village of Camerton, Cumberland (now Cumbria), England.

== History ==
The station opened on 28 April 1847. It closed to regular passenger traffic on 3 March 1952, closing completely when the line closed on 18 April 1966.

In later years the then DMU-operated 09:52 westbound from Carlisle (10:20 from Penrith) made a regular unadvertised Fridays-only call at the station, though there was no balancing call.

== Industry ==
Camerton Colliery and Camerton Fireclay mine and associated brickworks were served by sidings which curved northwards off the through lines a short distance east of the station. Coal workings appear to have petered out in the 1930s, but the brickworks was a successful operation, with firebricks being a key requirement of Workington's furnaces. From 1939 the Admiralty established RNAD Broughton Moor on the CWJR's line north east of Camerton. A lesser-known ancillary of this was using the fireclay workings at Camerton as an ammunition store. This appears to have petered out in the 1950s, though Broughton Moor arms depot lasted until 1992.

== Afterlife ==
By 2015 the station site was surrounded by nature.

Preceding station	Disused railways	Following station
Marron Junction; Line and station closed	London and North Western Railway; Cockermouth & Workington Railway	Workington Bridge; Line and station closed
Marron Junction; Line and station closed	Cleator and Workington Junction Railway	Workington Central; Line and station closed

== See also ==
- Cockermouth, Keswick and Penrith Railway
