= Workington railway station =

Railway station in Cumbria, England

Workington
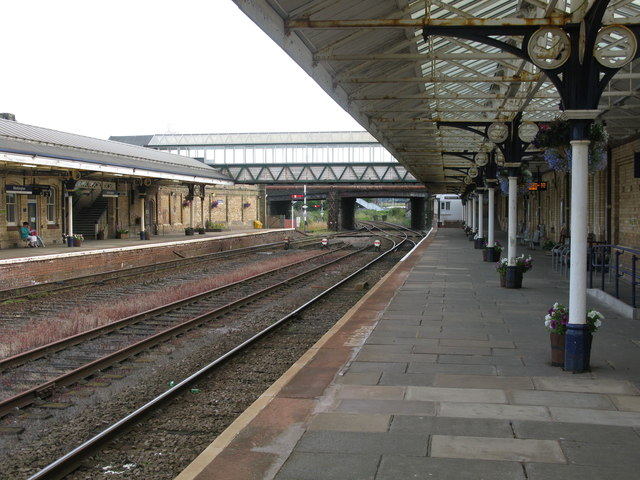

General information
- Location: Workington, Cumberland; England
- Coordinates: 54°38′42″N 3°33′32″W
- Grid reference: NX995288
- Owner: Network Rail
- Manager: Northern Trains
- Platforms: 2
- Tracks: 2

Other information
- Station code: WKG
- Classification: DfT category E

History
- Original company: Whitehaven Junction Railway
- Pre-grouping: London and North Western Railway
- Post-grouping: London, Midland and Scottish Railway; British Rail (London Midland Region)

Key dates
- 19 January 1846: Opened as Workington
- 2 June 1924: Renamed Workington Main
- 6 May 1968: Renamed Workington

Passengers
- 2020/21: ▼62,910
- 2021/22: ▲0.184 million
- 2022/23: ▲0.191 million
- 2023/24: ▲0.199 million
- 2024/25: ▲0.230 million
Location
- Location within the former Allerdale Borough Location within Cumbria
Notes
- Passenger statistics from the Office of Rail and Road

Workington railway station serves the coastal town of Workington, in Cumbria, England. It is a stop on the Cumbrian Coast Line, which runs between Carlisle and Barrow-in-Furness. It is owned by Network Rail and managed by Northern Trains.

== History ==
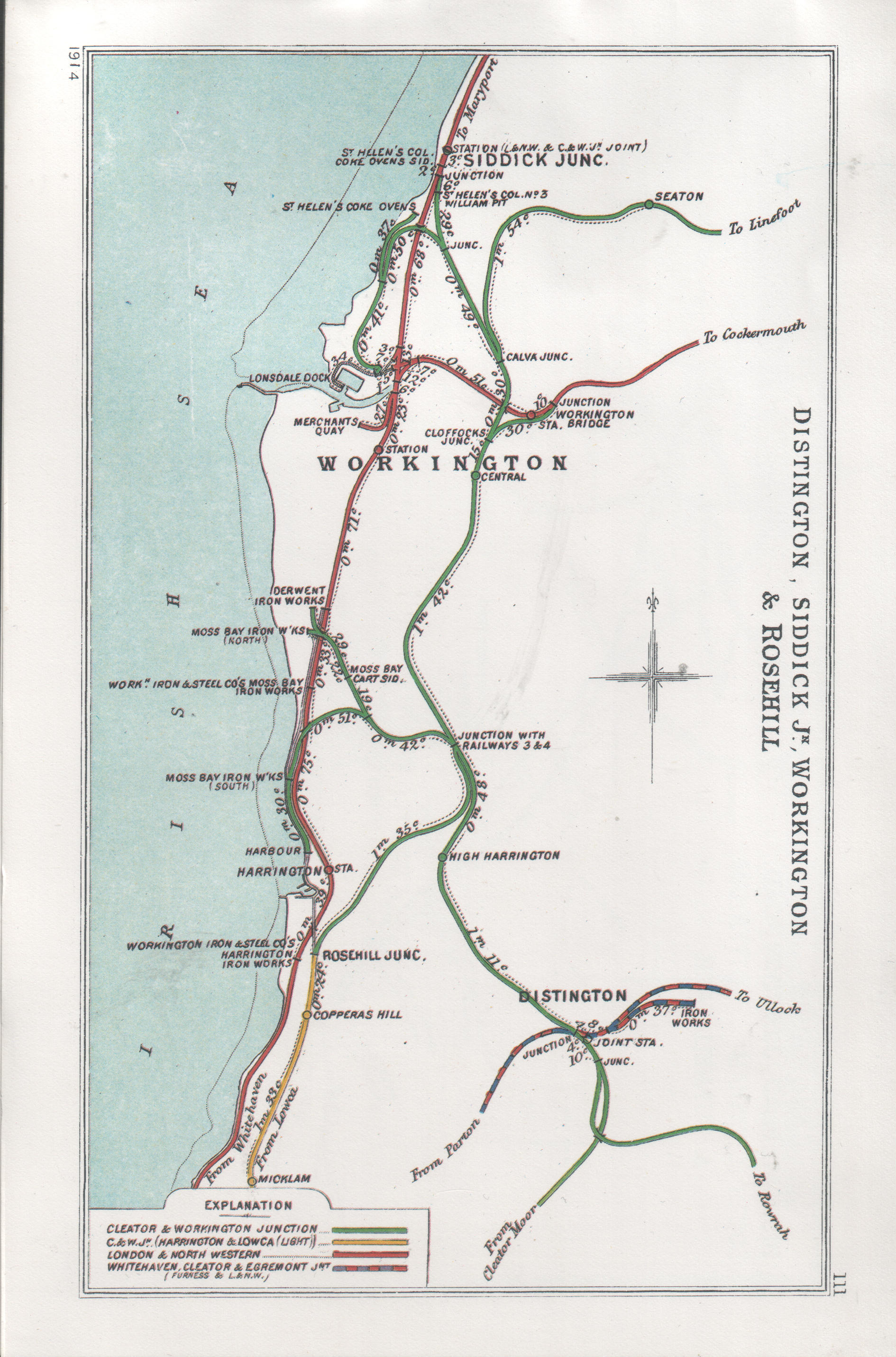
A 1914 Railway Clearing House junction diagram showing the complex network which existed in the Workington area

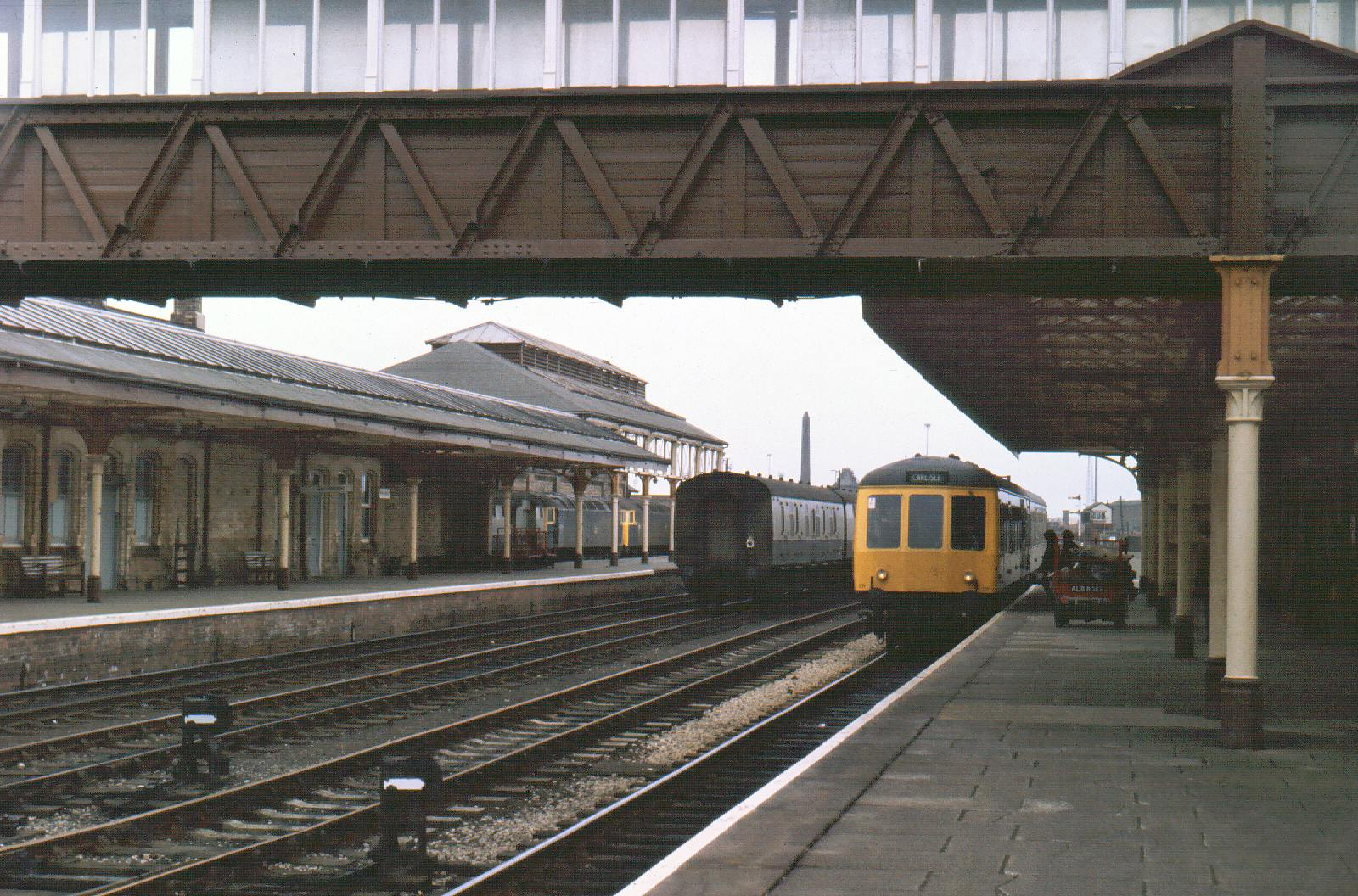
Workington station, August 1983

The first Workington station on the Cumbrian Coast Line was built in the area known as Priestgate Marsh, for the Whitehaven Junction Railway (WJR). Although the WJR was opened from Maryport to Workington in 1845, it advertised for tenders to build the station at Workington in October 1846.

The WJR station had a single arrival and departure platform (the line was single until 1860) and no platform canopy; in 1858, the Workington town trustees complained that "the platform is open to the prevailing winds and [we] believe Workington is the only first-class station in Great Britain so unprovided with shelter."

In 1854, mis-set points led to a Maryport-Whitehaven goods train being routed into the end bay used by the Workington-Cockermouth trains. The goods train demolished the buffers and "dashed through" the booking office, the porter's office and the gentleman's waiting room, carrying away the street wall of the station building and finally coming to rest at the far wall of the ladies' waiting room. The booking office clerk, having seen the train approaching, ensured there were no deaths; the Cumberland Pacquet reported that "the station is, of course, a perfect wreck" and had to be rebuilt. Immediately after the accident, the gas supply to the station was turned off at the meter, but it was noted that three gas lights continued to burn; the town trustees, who owned the town gasworks, declined to restore the supply until the WJR gave a satisfactory explanation or adequate compensation.

The London & North Western Railway took over the Whitehaven Junction and Workington & Cockermouth lines in 1866 and replaced the WJR station. The LNWR station was extended further north, with its principal entrance now facing Station Road; a footpath through the goods yard was suppressed and South Quay (linking the harbour with the town) was carried over the railway on a bridge, replacing a dangerous level crossing.

At the height of railway development, two other stations served Workington: Workington Bridge, on the Cockermouth and Workington Railway, and Workington Central, on the Cleator and Workington Junction Railway; both are now closed. The station on the coast line retained first claim on Workington but, after the opening of Workington Central, could be distinguished from it by local papers as the "Workington low railway station" It was formally known as Workington LNWR, to distinguish it from Workington Central; Workington Bridge was also an LNWR station or, post-grouping, when all three stations were LMS, as Workington Main.

With the closure of the other stations, it has reverted to being simply Workington railway station. Trains from the Cockermouth and Keswick direction ended with the closure of that branch to all traffic in April 1966; the line having fallen victim to the Beeching cuts.

== Layout ==
The station was built with yellow Crewe bricks and had four tracks running through the station. Two of the tracks not served by platforms were once used to stable Travelling Post Office carriages. There was also a twelve road engine shed, wagon repair shops, a coaling stage, a goods shed and a stable block, all built with local sandstone. In LMS days, a new turntable was installed behind the engine shed. In British Railways days, the engine shed was rebuilt with a new roof and ferro-concrete coaling stage and an ash disposal plant was built near to the new turntable.

The road approach to the station entrance was remodelled in BR days when the highways near to the station were upgraded. Immediately adjacent to the southbound platform are two carriage sidings, used for stabling and servicing empty diesel multiple unit sets overnight and at weekends. There is also a train crew depot here.

== Facilities ==
The station is staffed throughout the week, but closed in the evenings. There are waiting rooms and covered waiting areas on each platform, which are linked via footbridge. Step-free access is available to both platforms via ramps and a foot level crossing, though this is only open when station staff are present. Outside of these times, the only available access routes have steps. A public announcement system and digital information screens provide train running information.

== Workington North station ==
As a consequence of the November 2009 Great Britain and Ireland floods, Network Rail built a temporary additional station 1 mile (1.6 km) from the existing station on waste ground, off the A596 adjacent to a business park. An additional hourly shuttle train, composed of a locomotive and at least three former inter-city main line coaches, was operated by Cumbrian-based Direct Rail Services on behalf of Northern Rail. It ran from Workington northbound to Maryport and was created in the aftermath of the floods. This service started on 30 November 2009 and ran until 28 May 2010. It was initially funded by the Department for Transport at a cost of £216,000. All services between Workington and Maryport were free of charge for this period.

== Services ==
Northern Trains operates a generally hourly service northbound to Carlisle and southbound to Whitehaven, with most trains going onward to Barrow-in-Furness. No late evening service operates south of Whitehaven. A few through trains operate to/from Lancaster via the Furness Line.

As of May 2025, the weekday timetable is as follows:

- 1 tph to Carlisle via Maryport, Aspatria and Wigton
- 1 tph to Barrow-in-Furness via Whitehaven, Sellafield and Millom, of which
  - 6 tpd continue to Lancaster, of which
    - 1 tpd to continue to Preston

Northern Rail introduced a regular through Sunday service to Barrow, via the coast, at the May 2018 timetable change - the first such service south of Whitehaven for more than 40 years. Services run approximately hourly from mid-morning until early evening, with later trains terminating at Whitehaven. This represents a major upgrade on the former infrequent service of four per day each way to/from Whitehaven, only that previously operated.

| Preceding station | National Rail | Following station |
|---|---|---|
| Flimby | Northern Trains; Cumbrian Coast Line | Harrington |
| | Disused railways | |
| Workington Bridge | London and North Western Railway; Cockermouth and Workington Railway | Terminus |
| | Historical railways | |
| Workington North | Northern Rail; Cumbrian Coast Line | Harrington |
| Siddick Junction | London and North Western Railway; Whitehaven Junction Railway | Harrington |
