= Whitehaven and Workington =

UK Parliament constituency (since 2024)

- County constituency for the House of Commons
- Interactive map of boundaries since 2024
- Location within North West England
- County: Cumbria
- Electorate: 73,385 (March 2020)
- Major settlements: Whitehaven, Workington, Cleator Moor, Egremont

Current constituency
- Created: 2024
- Member of Parliament: Josh MacAlister (Labour)
- Seats: One
- Created from: Copeland & Workington

Whitehaven and Workington is a constituency of the House of Commons in the UK Parliament. Further to the completion of the 2023 review of Westminster constituencies, it was contested for the first time at the 2024 general election, since when it has been represented by Josh MacAlister of the Labour Party.

== Boundaries ==
The 2023 boundary review was carried out using the local authority structure as it existed in Cumbria on 1 December 2020 and is officially defined as:

- The Borough of Allerdale wards of: Dalton; Flimby; Harrington & Salterbeck; Moorclose & Moss Bay; St. John’s; St. Michael’s; Seaton & Northside; Stainburn & Clifton.
- The Borough of Copeland wards of: Arlecdon & Ennerdale; Beckermet; Cleator Moor; Corkickle; Distington, Lowca & Parton; Egremont; Gosforth & Seascale; Hillcrest; Kells; Moor Row & Bigrigg; Moresby; St. Bees; Sneckyeat; Whitehaven Central; Whitehaven South.

With effect from 1 April 2023, the Boroughs of Allerdale and Copeland were abolished and absorbed into the new unitary authority of Cumberland. Consequently, the constituency now comprises the following wards of Cumberland from the 2024 general election:

- Bransty; Cleator Moor East and Frizington; Cleator Moor West; Cockermouth South (part); Egremont; Egremont North and St Bees; Gosforth; Harrington; Hillcrest and Hensingham; Howgate; Kells and Sandwith; Maryport South (part); Millom Without (small part); Mirehouse; Moss Bay and Moorclose; St John's and Great Clifton; St Michael's; Seaton.

The seat covers the majority of, and replaces, the Copeland constituency, including the town of Whitehaven, together with the town of Workington and surrounding areas from the abolished constituency of Workington.

== Members of Parliament ==
Election	Member	Party
2024	Josh MacAlister	Labour

== Elections ==
=== Elections in the 2020s ===
General election 2024: Whitehaven & Workington
Party	Candidate	Votes	%	±%
Labour	Josh MacAlister	22,173	52.9	+8.9
Reform	David Surtees	8,887	21.2	+19.7
Conservative	Andrew Johnson	8,455	20.2	−28.2
Green	Jill Perry	1,207	2.9	+1.7
Liberal Democrats	Chris Wills	1,118	2.7	−1.3
Majority		13,286	31.7	
Turnout		41,840	57.2	−10.1
Labour win (new seat)				
