= John Adams, 1st Baron Adams =

British politician and peer (1890–1960)

Baron Adams in July 1949

John Jackson Adams, 1st Baron Adams, OBE, JP (12 October 1890 – 23 August 1960), also known as Jack Adams, was a British miner, local politician, trade unionist and public servant.

== Background ==
Born in 1890 in Arlecdon, Cumberland, he was the seventh son in the family of nine sons and three daughters of Thomas Adams and his wife Mary Bowness (died 1914, aged 62). His father worked at the New Parkside iron ore mine, Wilder, Frizington. He died in a mine cage accident in 1894, aged 43.

Adams was educated at Arlecdon Council School. He left school aged 12 to work, initially helping his mother as a cleaner. He was in farm service, and then in the mines. In 1910 he went to work as a miner at Runanga, New Zealand. He was involved in trade union work, and associated there with Harry Holland, Bob Semple and Paddy Webb. He returned to West Cumberland in 1913.

== Local politics and trade unionist ==
Adams was a follower of Keir Hardie, and his attitude towards World War I was pacifist. He joined the Arlecdon Parish Council shortly after returning to England, and in 1916 wrote, as a parish council member, to the Whitehaven News in defence of Arlecdon Fair. At age 28 he found himself unemployed, and travelled in search of work. He became a Labour Party activist and local politician. According to Hugh Dalton, "he made up his mind that he would do away with unemployment in West Cumberland".

In 1919, Adams became a member of Cumberland County Council. He defeated Thomas Dixon (1861–1923) of Rheda, Frizington, first elected for the Arlecdon district in 1898, and High Sheriff of Cumberland in 1903. Forward pointed out that Tom Cape of the Independent Labour Party had become Member of Parliament for Workington in 1918, and wrote:

Jack Adams, a working miner, young, able, vigorous, militant, true as steel, opposed the chief of the clan, the local, royalty owning, Conservative squire, who had held the seat for 27 [sic] years.

Also in 1919, Adams led a successful challenge to the sitting members of Arlecdon and Frizington's Urban District Council (UDC), with Labour candidates unseating all nine. This electoral coup established the first all-Labour council to be elected in England; and Adams chaired the UDC from 1919 to 1923.

In 1921 Adams became general secretary of the Colliery Winding Enginemen's Union, in Workington. At this period windingmen's unions were craft unions, typically based in a district. From 1922 Adams was vice-chairman of the County Health Committee. He was later its chairman, from 1942 to 1948; he took over from Lady Mabel Howard, the previous chairman and wife of Henry Howard, a friend who died in 1942. He was a member of Workington Borough Council from 1923 to 1931. Before 1934 he was honoured with the office of County Alderman.

== Development of West Cumberland ==
The effect of the Great Depression in West Cumberland was severe, and under the Special Areas Act 1934 it was designated a "special area". Adams became in 1935 secretary to the new Cumberland Development Council. Initially the chairman was William Findlow Sadler, formerly of Vickers Armstrong, who died in 1937. A tannery was set up in Haverigg, with government backing and funding from the Nuffield Trust. Another success was the re-opening of the Whitehaven coal mines in March 1937, again with help from the Nuffield Trust. They had been idle for a year, and it followed a takeover. Norman Nicholson, whose father was in the Chamber of Trade at Millom and went to Workington for one of Adams's meetings, wrote of "the almost fanatical persistence" shown by Adams, and the gradual arrival of factories and small businesses, some of them employing mostly unmarried girls and young women.

Adams worked at 30 Roper Street, Whitehaven, with District Commissioner George Mallaby as colleague in 1938–9, who was assigned to attracting industry. Mallaby described Adams as pugnacious and overwhelming voluble, redeemed by a lack of personal animus. The then chairman of the Council was Arthur Hibbert (1885–1947), who managed the Millom and Askan Iron and Steel Co. He was largely sidelined in meetings by the extensive reports from Adams.

Mallaby mentions the geographer George Henry John Daysh (1901–1986) at Newcastle as someone who gained Adams's respect; he made a survey of West Cumberland. Of the Labour Party's distressed areas surveys that began in 1936, Linehan writes

The idea for the survey originated at the annual conference, from a delegate in Whitehaven in West Cumberland, and it is difficult not to see the hand of Jack Adams in the exercise. It was somewhat typical of the political astuteness of Adams to, on the one hand, take funding from the National Government's Special Areas fund, and then seek to undermine it by supporting a new survey that could only protest at the effectiveness of the Special Areas policy.

Adams also became general manager of the West Cumberland Industrial Development Co. Ltd. There the chairman was Robert Crichton (1881–1950), with a background in steel. Adams came to defer to his experience. The project was to build industrial facilities to let. In the case of the West Cumberland Silk Mills at Whitehaven, Adams made a protégé of Nicholas Sekers, a refugee from Hungary and the managing director from 1938.

The outbreak of World War II transformed the exploitation of the natural resources of West Cumberland from uneconomic to strategically important. In wartime, Adams also had a hand in bringing Marchon Chemicals and its co-founder Frank Schon from London to a Whitehaven factory.

In 1943 Adams was awarded an OBE. From 1943 to 1947 he held the office of Deputy Regional Controller of the Board of Trade for Cumberland and Westmorland Sub-region. He had protested to the Board that West Cumberland was not prepared to be part of the "North Western machinery" based on Manchester. The sub-region included Furness. In 1957 the Encyclopædia Britannica wrote:

By April 1955 approximately 60 industries, including engineering, tanning, leather, textile and chemical, had been introduced to west Cumberland, and work was available for 75,000 people.

== Later life ==
On 16 February 1949, Adams was elevated to the peerage as Baron Adam', of Ennerdale in the County of Cumberland; he was the first Cumbrian to be so honoured since 1797. He retired in 1959, and died on 23 August 1960. He is buried in Arlecdon churchyard.

The Lord Adams of Ennerdale Fellowship at Newcastle University was founded by donations given in his memory. The first holder was Robert Woof.

== Family ==
Adams married on 22 January 1914 Agnes Jane Birney, a teacher, daughter of Thomas Birney of Barwise Row, Arlecdon. The family home was Greystoke, Loop Road North, Whitehaven. Later it was at Wybrow Terrace, Workington. They had one son, Thomas Adams (b. 1923), who died in infancy. As Lord Adams had no surviving male issue the title became extinct upon his death on 23 August 1960.

== Arms ==
Coat of arms of John Adams, 1st Baron Adams
| Crest Out of the Head of a Well a Fieldfare rising proper Escutcheon Vert a Torch erect between in chief two Cog Wheels and issuant from the base a Sun rising Or thereon an Open Book proper bound and clasped Gules Supporters Dexter: A Miner holding in the interior hand a Lamp and supporting in the exterior a Pickaxe all proper; Sinister: An Agricultural Labourer resting the exterior hand on a Fork all proper Motto Labore Omnia Vincit |

Peerage of the United Kingdom
| New creation | Baron Adams; 1949–1960 — | Extinct |
