= Arlecdon =

Village in Cumbria, England

Coordinates: 54.55°N 03.48°W

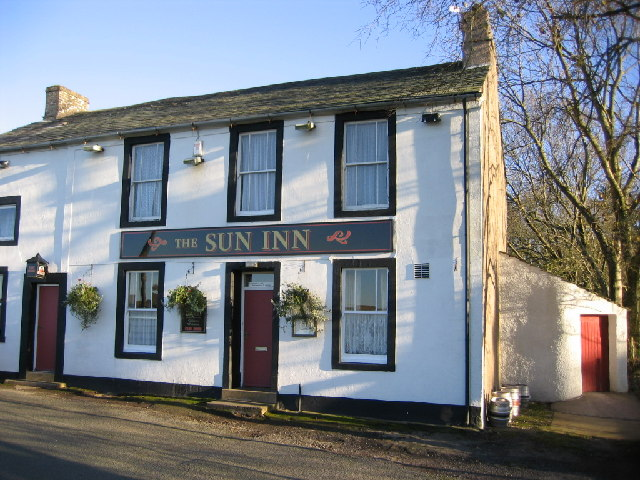
- The Sun Inn

- Location within Cumbria
- OS grid reference: NY0419
- Civil parish: Arlecdon and Frizington
- Unitary authority: Cumberland
- Ceremonial county: Cumbria
- Region: North West
- Country: England
- Sovereign state: United Kingdom
- Post town: FRIZINGTON
- Postcode district: CA26
- Dialling code: 01946
- Police: Cumbria
- Fire: Cumbria
- Ambulance: North West
- UK Parliament: Whitehaven and Workington

Arlecdon is a village in Cumberland in Cumbria, England, near the town of Whitehaven.

== Toponymy ==
Arlecdon comes from the Old English 'earn-lāce denu', meaning 'eagle-stream valley'.

== Church ==
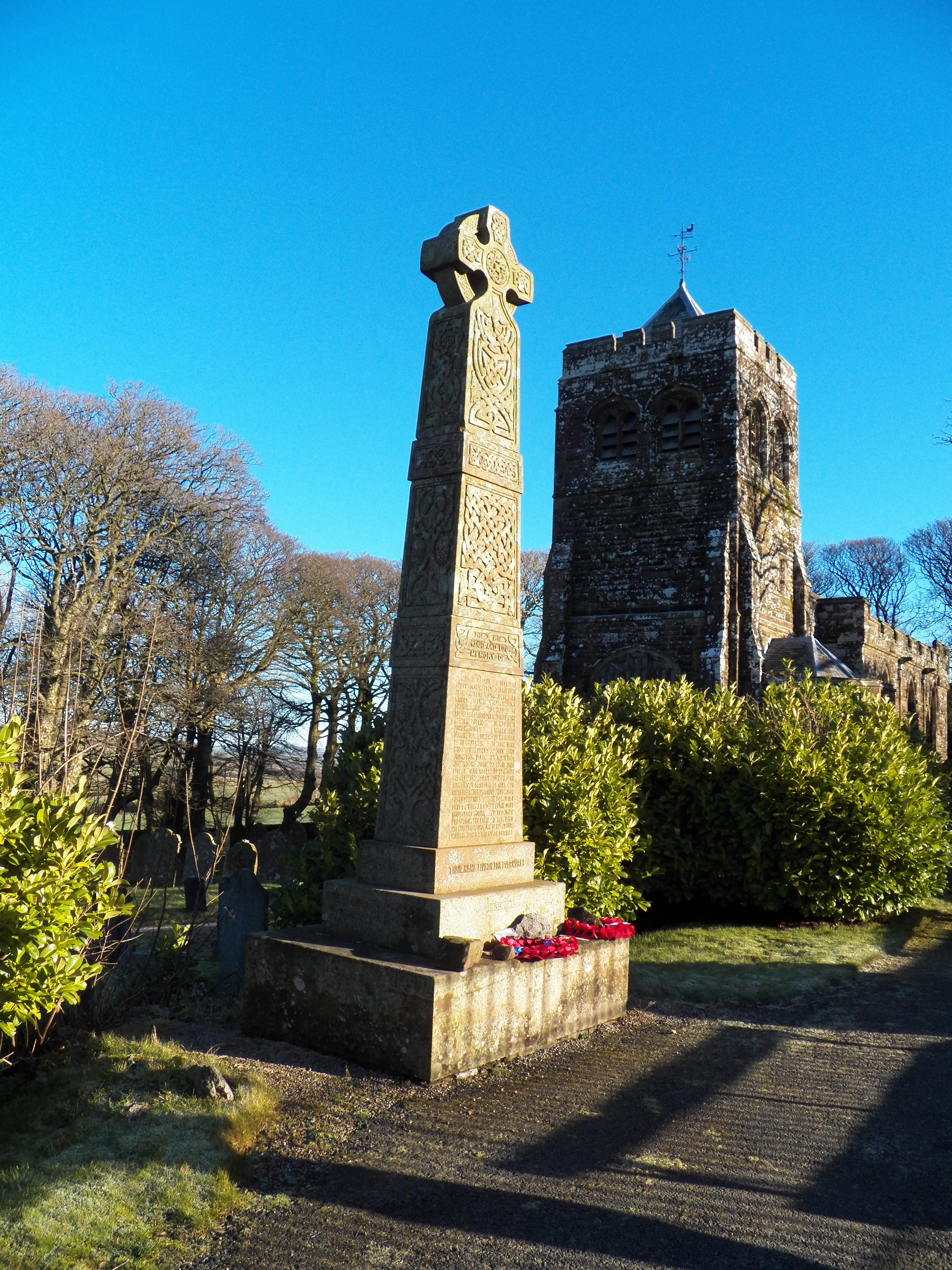
Arlecdon church and war memorial

St Michael's Parish church is an historic Grade II listed church, which is located about halfway between the villages of Arlecdon and Asby. The church founded in the 12th or 13th century. The church was restored in 1776 and its nave was rebuilt in 1829. The church was extensively remodelled, and had its tower added from 1903 to 1905. However, the church retains its chancel arch of c. 1630, which incorporates parts of the original 12th-century arch. The church's octagonal font is dated 1578. The church contains a stained glass window dedicated to Isaac Fletcher of Frizington. In 1904 the church was remodelled, with the addition of a bell tower and eight bells cast by John Taylor & Son of Loughborough.

In 2014 it was announced that the church is to close, and the bells hopefully re-used in another church.

== Village ==
The village also has a 19th-century primary school and an old Sunday school.

== Governance ==
Arlecdon forms part of the civil parish of Arlecdon and Frizington. There are two tiers of local government, at civil parish and unitary authority level: Arlecdon and Frizington Parish Council and Cumberland Council.

=== Administrative history ===
Arlecdon was an ancient parish within the historic county of Cumberland. The parish was subdivided into three townships: Frizington, Whillimoor, and an Arlecdon township which covered the area around the village and parish church and also included Asby.

In 1882, a local government district called Arlecdon and Frizington was created, covering those two townships. The Arlecdon and Frizington district was enlarged in 1894 to take in the Whillimoor township, after which the Arlecdon and Frizington district covered the whole parish of Arlecdon. Later that year, local government districts were reconstituted as urban districts under the Local Government Act 1894.

Arlecdon and Frizington Urban District was abolished in 1934. The parish of Arlecdon it had covered was renamed Arlecdon and Frizington, given a parish council, and reclassified as a rural parish within the Ennerdale Rural District. Ennerdale Rural District was abolished in 1974, becoming part of the Borough of Copeland in the new county of Cumbria. Copeland was in turn abolished in 2023 when the new Cumberland Council was created, also taking over the functions of the abolished Cumbria County Council in the area.

== Notable people ==
- John Adams, 1st Baron Adams OBE, JP, MA (12 October 1890 – 23 August 1960). British politician and public servant. The son of Thomas Adams and Mary Bowness, he was raised to the peerage as Baron Adams on 16 February 1949, the first Cumberland-born man to be so honoured since 1797. He is buried by the foot of the church tower.
- Billy Adams, professional footballer

== See also ==
- Listed buildings in Arlecdon and Frizington
