= Rowrah =

Village in Cumbria, England

Coordinates: 54.553°N 3.462°W

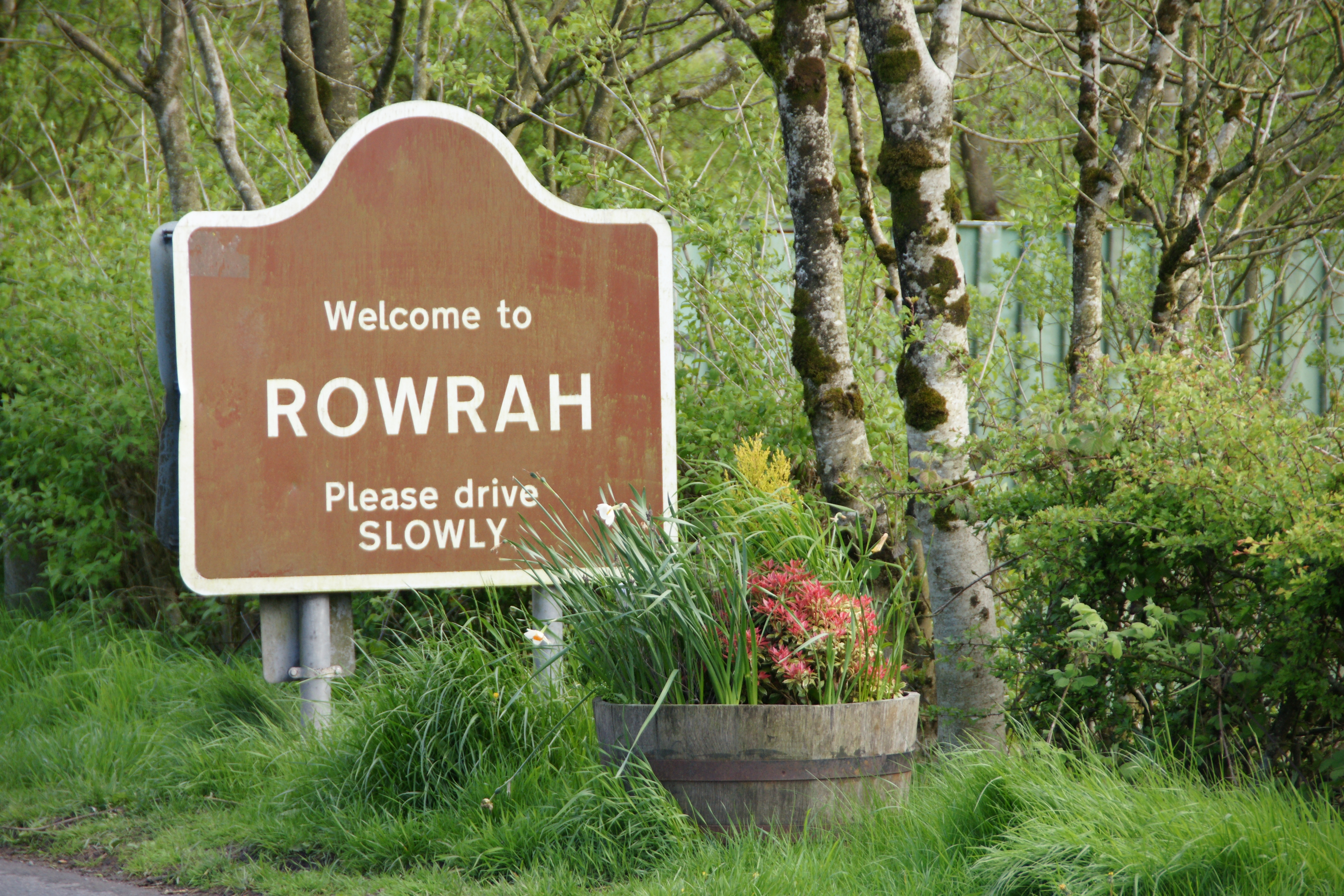

- Location in Copeland Borough Location within Cumbria
- OS grid reference: NY0518
- Civil parish: Arlecdon and Frizington; Lamplugh
- Unitary authority: Cumberland
- Ceremonial county: Cumbria
- Region: North West
- Country: England
- Sovereign state: United Kingdom
- Post town: FRIZINGTON
- Postcode district: CA26
- Dialling code: 01946
- Police: Cumbria
- Fire: Cumbria
- Ambulance: North West
- UK Parliament: Whitehaven and Workington

Rowrah is a village in Cumbria, England, and spans the civil parishes of Arlecdon and Frizington and Lamplugh. The majority of Rowrah is within Arlecdon and Frizington. The parish boundaries are formed from the Windergill Beck and Colliergate Beck: as such nine properties, Rowrah Hall Farm, Rowrah Hall, Ainsdale House, Rowrah Head, four properties on Pheasants Rise and Rowrah Station technically fall within Lamplugh.

Until 1974 Rowrah was part of the county of Cumberland. Like many of the towns and villages in Cumberland, Rowrah is not mentioned in the Domesday Book as in 1092, the date of the book, the majority of Cumberland was within the kingdom of Scotland. Cumberland, and therefore Rowrah, did not permanently become part of England until 1273 with the signing of the Treaty of York.

== General ==
Rowrah consists of two main residential roads, Rowrah Road (A5086) and Pasture Road. Pheasants Rise was built in 2000 by Swift Homes in between Edgars Garage and Rowrah Head, this was the first major build in Rowrah for over 100 years. The majority of houses in Rowrah are terraced and a few still have the original frontage that reflects the architecture of the time. There is a small row of houses on the approach to the old Railway Station. Rowrah Hall, Rowrah Head and Rowrah Hall Farm, until the construction of Ainsdale House in 1992, were the only buildings to the south of Rowrah Road. The A5086 Rowrah Road becomes Arlecdon Parks Road as it turns towards Arlecdon, approximately 20 yards of Arlecdon Parks Road falls within the village boundary of Rowrah.

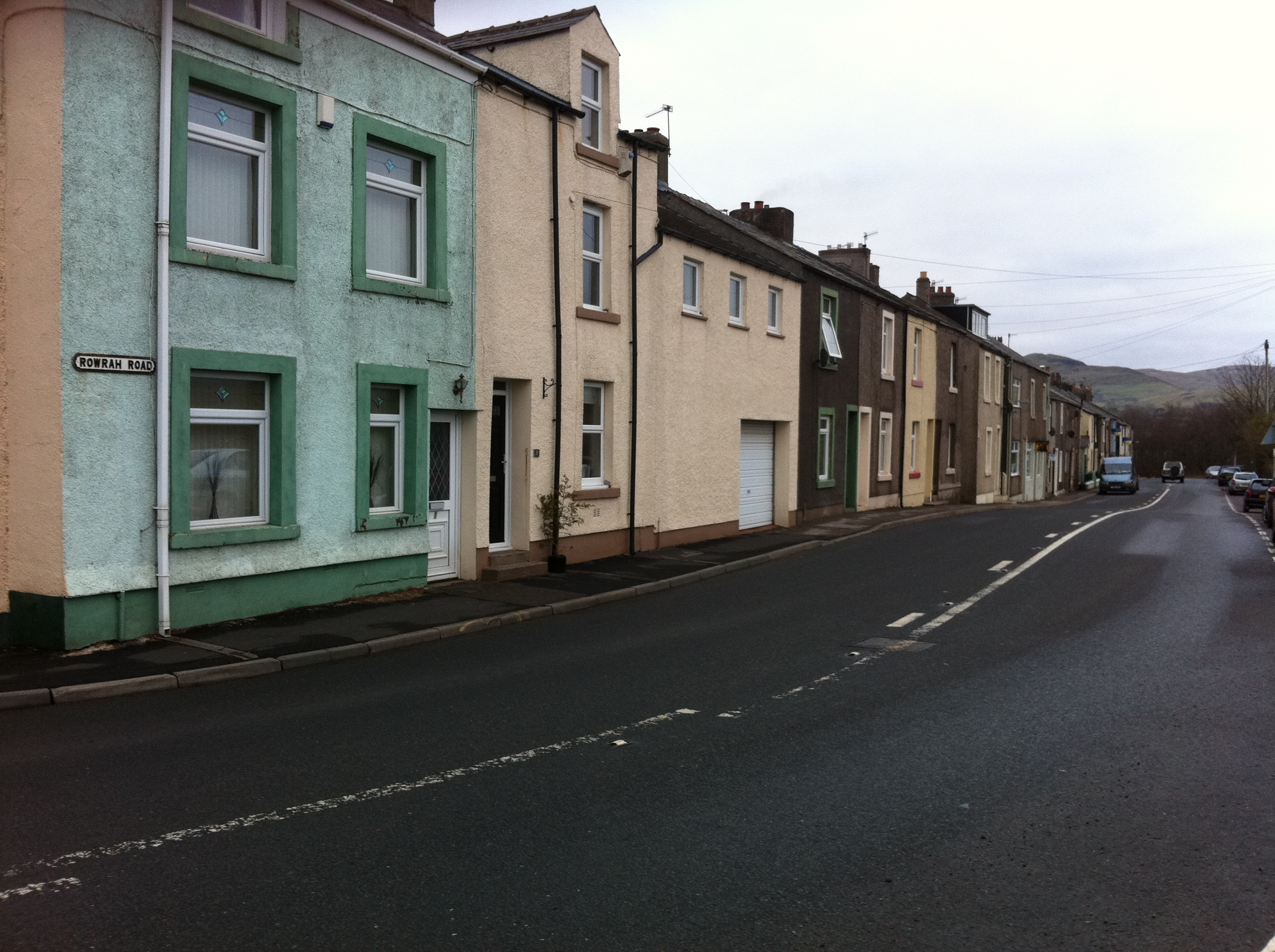
Rowrah Road, Rowrah as viewed from the corner with Arlecdon Parks Road

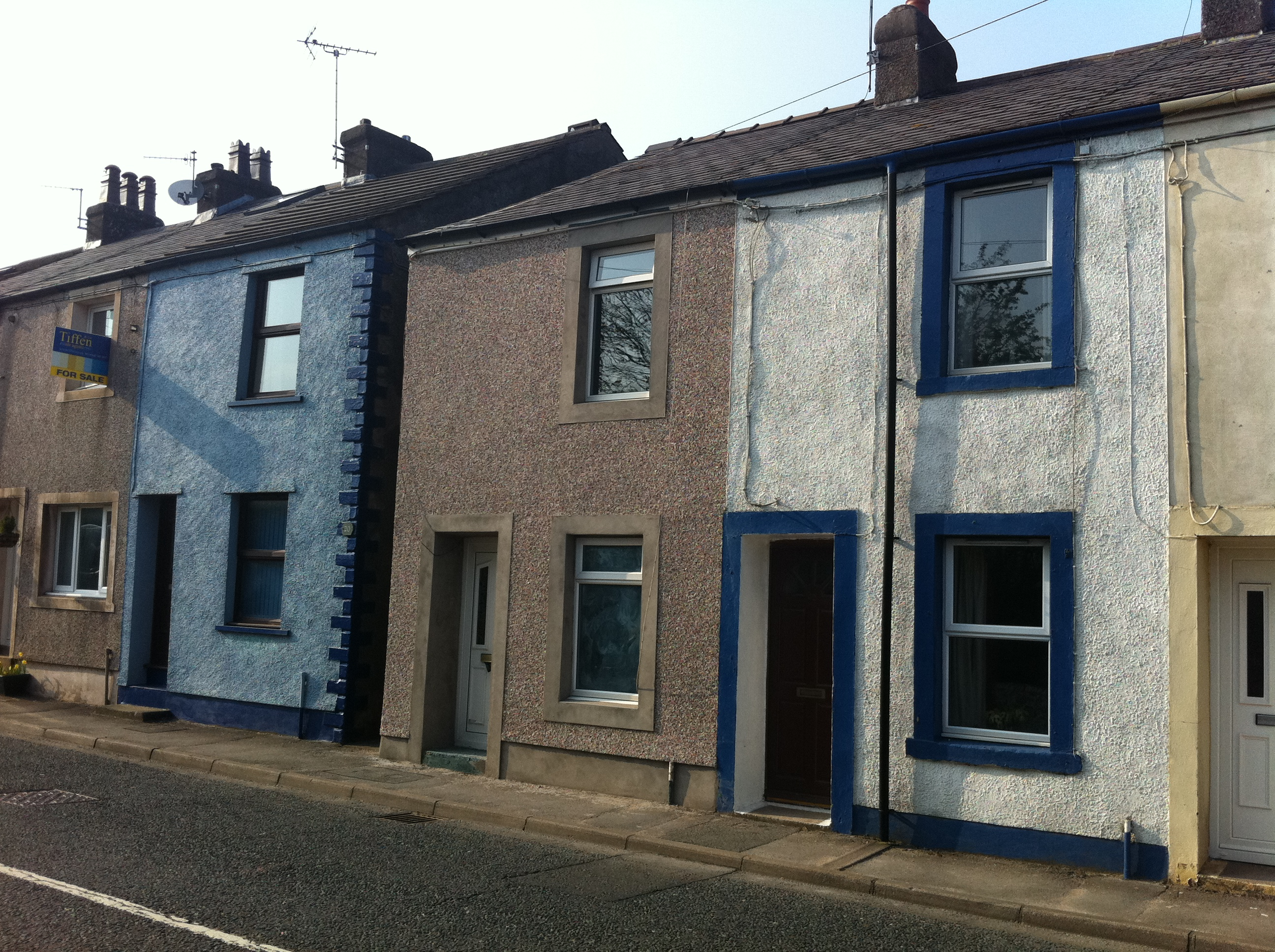
Typical terraced houses, Rowrah Road, Rowrah

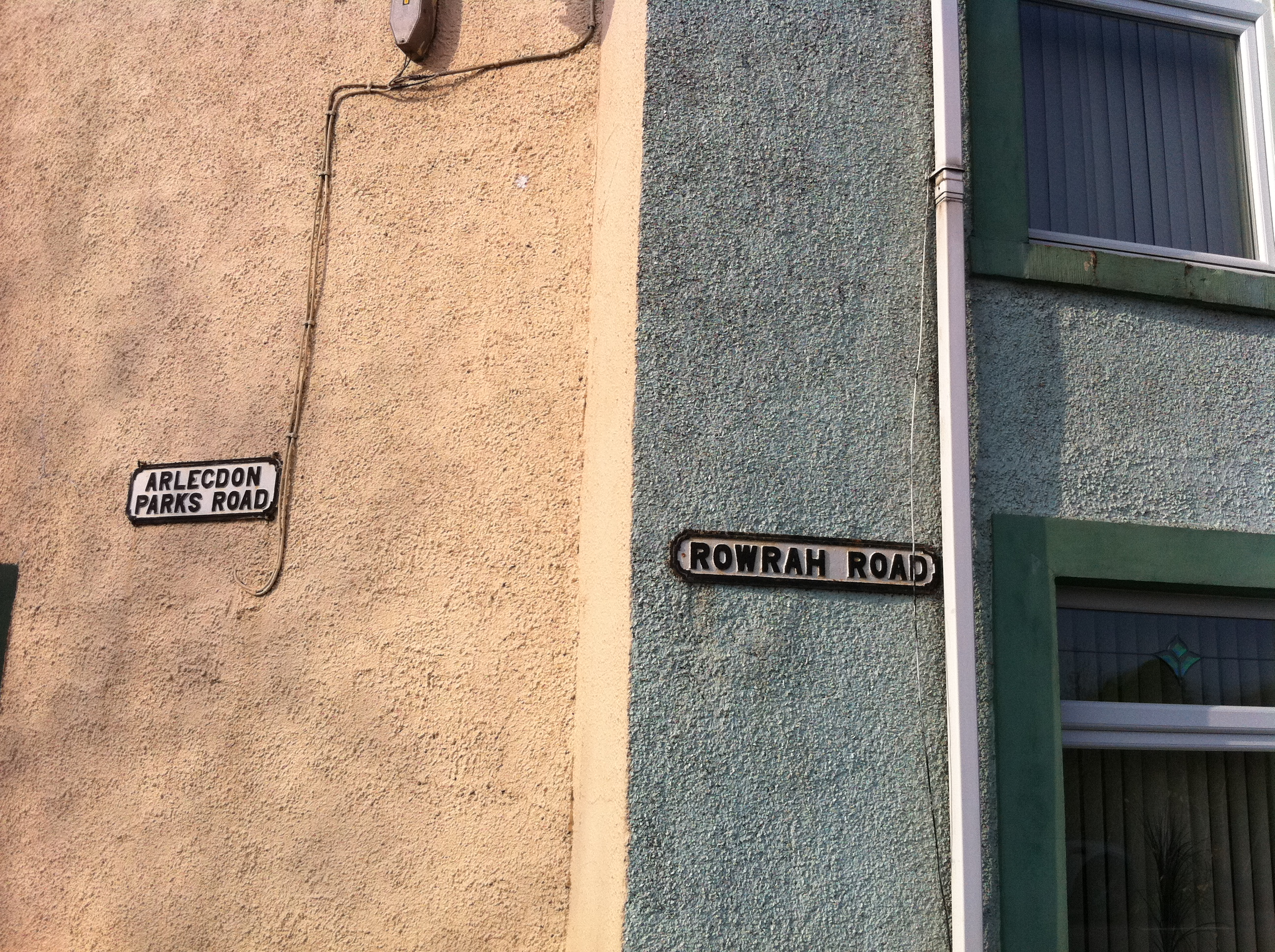
Rowrah Road and Arlecdon Parks Road join each other with approximately 20 yards of Arlecdon Parks Road being in Rowrah.

== Geography ==
Rowrah is situated in a minor valley with an east–west direction and is part of the watershed between the River Ehen and the River Derwent, Cumbria. To the west flows the Windergill Beck contributing to the River Ehen, the source of Windergill Beck is located within the grounds of Rowrah Hall. To the east flows the Colliergate Beck contributing to the River Marron which in turn contributes into the River Derwent, Cumbria.

Rowrah is 169m above sea level.

== Railways ==
=== Connections ===
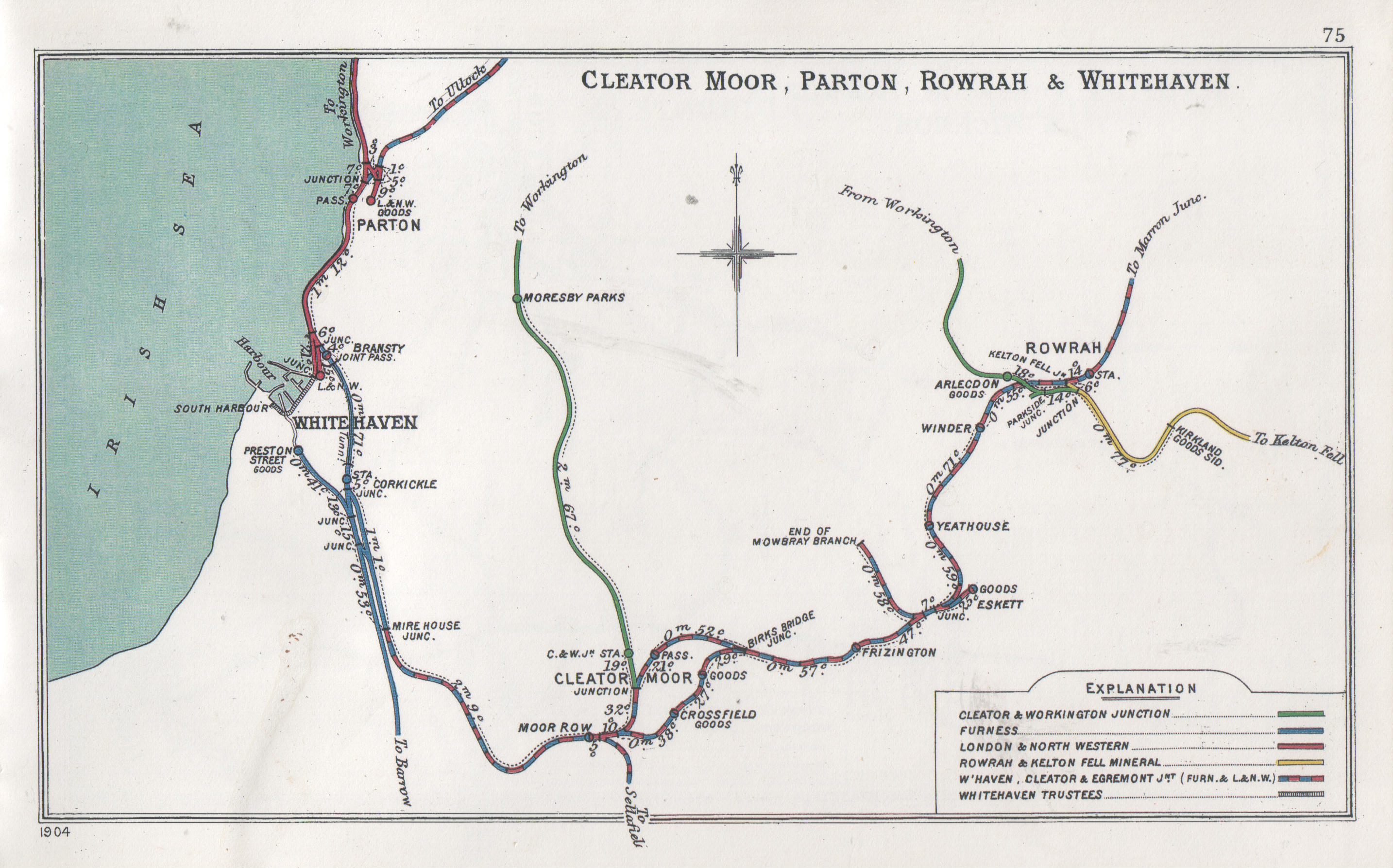
All four routes into and out of Rowrah are clearly shown on this map dated 1904 and 1914.

A composite map of Rowrah circa 1920 the map clearly indicates the complexity of the track work that served the three lines.

Before the formation of London, Midland and Scottish Railway on 1 January 1923, Rowrah was connected by three separate railway companies, two of which terminated in Rowrah thus giving four separate lines into and out of Rowrah for the conveyance of passengers and goods.

1. The Rowrah – Marron junction line connecting with Workington and Cockermouth line, part of Whitehaven, Cleator and Egremont Railway under the ownership of Furness Railway
2. The Rowrah – Workington Branch Via Arlecdon and Distington, part of the Cleator and Workington Junction Railway, sometimes referred to as Track of the Ironmasters.
3. The Rowrah – Whitehaven line, part of Whitehaven, Cleator and Egremont Railway under the ownership of Furness Railway
4. Rowrah and Kelton Fell Railway, sometimes referred to as "Baird's Line"

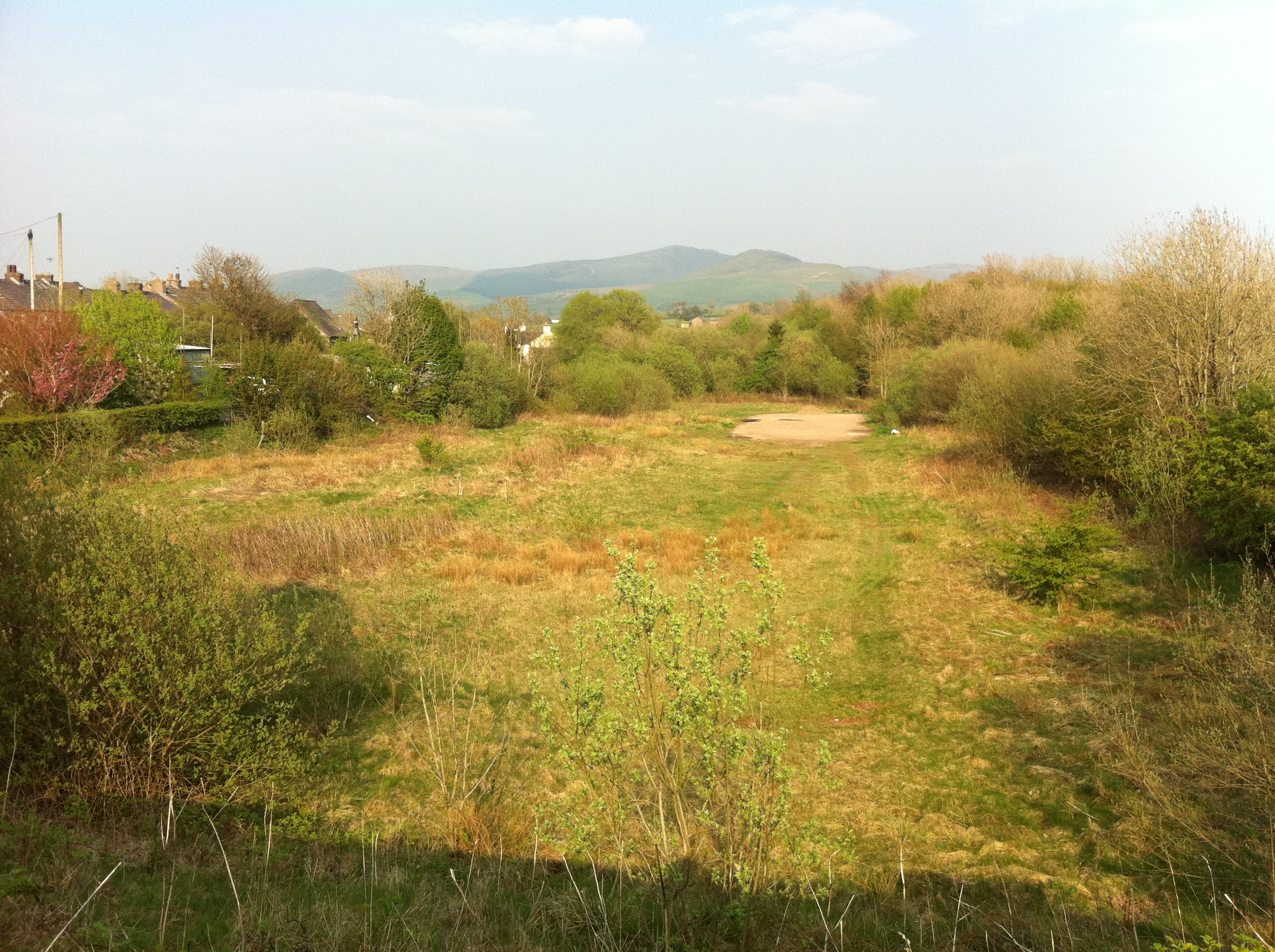
The Rowrah Railway Yard, now disused. Towards the rear of the image the small car park for C2C cyclists is visible.

=== Whitehaven, Cleator and Egremont Railway ===
On 1 February 1864 Rowrah was connected by the Whitehaven, Cleator and Egremont Railway. Rowrah station, located on Pasture Road, can be seen using this view from Google Street View. At the top of Pasture Road Rowrah had two hotels, The Railway Hotel and The Stork Hotel.

The line was further extended to Wrights Green ("The Lamplugh Extension") and on 2 April 1866 the line was connected with the Workington and Cockermouth line at using a Wye (rail) (triangular track) arrangement at Marron Junction thus creating the Whitehaven and Marron Junction branch line. At the opening of the "Lamplugh Extension" it was also announced that an Electrical telegraph had been installed on the line at the demand of the Iron ore companies at a grand cost of £56.

By 1875 Rowrah had become a sufficiently complex junction that it was deemed to require its own signal box, this resulted in the opening of Rowrah No1. Signal Box.

=== Cleator and Workington Junction Railway ===
The Cleator and Workington Junction Railway was founded in 1876 and was given the nickname of "Track of the Ironmasters" due to the fact that its primary purpose was to transport trucks of iron ore down from mines located at Knockmurton and Kelton (via Rowrah) to the Iron works at Workington, Cleator Moor and Distington.

On 1 May 1888 a joint application was made for a "tramway on the Rowrah Estate", this was between Thomas Dixon (the owner of Rowrah Head Quarry) and Anthony Joseph Steele Dixon of Rheda and the Cleator and Workington Junction Railway. A further application was made on 1 October 1906 in respect to extension of lines to be constructed on the Rowrah Hall Estate between 1) the Cleator and Workington Junction Railway Company and 2) Thomas Dixon, Rheda and Anthony Joseph Steele Dixon, Lorton Hall.

Initially the Whitehaven, Cleator and Egremont Railway only carried goods, specifically iron ore and coal but it was later extended to carry passengers. Rowrah continued to have a passenger service until 1931 at which point both the Whitehaven, Cleator and Egremont Railway and Cleator and Workington Junction Railway withdrew their service in the face of increasing competition from the bus service. Many of the local older residents have memories of reasonably frequent school services, charter trains, Railtours and various specials from Rowrah into the 1950s and 1960s.

=== Rowrah and Kelton Fell Railway ===
Rowrah was also the terminus of the 3 1/2 Mile Rowrah and Kelton Fell Railway that was constructed to reduce the cost of the conveyance of Iron ore and Limestone from the Knockmurton and Kelton mines. Prior to the construction of the railway the cost of transport via road to Rowrah / Wrights Green was three and six a ton (17.5p). A single locomotive of the Rowrah and Kelton Fell Railway was preserved by the Scottish Railway Preservation Society and can be seen at their Falkirk Museum located at the Bo'ness and Kinneil Railway. The Rowrah and Kelton Fell Railway was opened in January 1877 and the track eventually lifted in 1934, the route was only ever used for the carriage of goods, specifically Iron ore.

=== Railtours and special services ===
Visiting Railtours that came to Rowrah after 1931 include:-

==== West Cumberland Railtour, 5 September 1954 ====
Organiser: Stephenson Locomotive Society and Manchester Locomotive Society
Traction: Furness Railway Class D5 0-6-0 No. 52494
Traction: Furness Railway Class D5 0-6-0 No. 52501
Formation: 5 carriage .
Route: Sellafield, Egremont, Moor Row, Cleator Moor Goods, Birks Bridge Jn, Eskett Jn, Rowrah, Ullock Jn, Marron Jn, Workington Bridge Jn, Derwent Jn, Workington, Derwent Jn, Siddick Junction, Dock Jn, Calva Jn, Seaton, Buckhill, Seaton, Calva Jn, Cloffocks Jn, Workington Central, Harrington, Cumbria Jn, Distington, Moresby Parks, Cleator Moor Jn, Moor Row, Mirehouse Jn, Corkickle, Whitehaven (Bransty)

==== The Solway Ranger Railtour, 13 June 1964 ====
Organiser: R.C.T.S. (West Riding Branch)
Traction: LNER Class D40 Great North of Scotland Railway No. 49 'Gordon Highlander'
Traction: Caledonian Railway Single 123
Traction: SR Merchant Navy class No. 35012 'United States Lines'
Traction: LMS Stanier Class 5 4-6-0 No. 45394
Traction: LMS Ivatt Class 2 2-6-0 No. 46426
Traction: LMS Ivatt Class 2 2-6-0 No. 46458
Traction: Unknown Diesel multiple unit
Route: Leeds City South, Shipley Leeds Jn, Keighley, Snaygill, Skipton, Hellifield, Settle Jn, Clapham, Wennington Jn, Carnforth East Jn, Carnforth F & M Jn, Carnforth No.2 Jn, Carnforth Jn, Oxenholme, Tebay, Shap Summit, Penrith No.1, Penrith, Blencow, Penruddock, Threlkeld, Keswick, Braithwaite, Bassenthwaite Lake, Cockermouth, Cockermouth Jn, Derwent Jn, Workington Main (Diesel multiple unit replaces steam), Moss Bay Iron Works, Whitehaven Bransty, Corkickle, Moor Row, Rowrah (14.23a ~ 14.38d), Moor Row, Egremont, Cumbria, Beckermet Mines Jn, Sellafield railway station, Nethertown, St Bees, Corkickle, Whitehaven Bransty, Moss Bay Iron Works, Workington Main, Aspatria, Wigton, Carlisle No.8, Carlisle (Steam replaces Diesel multiple unit), Carlisle No.3, Canal Jn, Drumburgh, Silloth, Drumburgh, Canal Jn, Carlisle No.3, Carlisle, Petteril Bridge Jn, Lazonby & Kirkoswald, Appleby West, Ais Gill, Blea Moor, Settle Jn, Hellifield, Skipton, Snaygill, Keighley, Shipley Leeds Jn, Leeds City South

==== Solway Railtour of West Cumberland by brake van, 7 May 1966 ====
Organiser: The Railway Enthusiasts Club of Farnborough, Hants
Traction: LMS Ivatt Class 4, 43006
Route: Workington railway station (main), Siddick junction, Calva junction, Buckhill RNAD (the Dump), Siddick, Parton railway station, No 4 pit siding (Lowca), Parton railway station, Whitehaven (Corcickle), Moor Row, Rowrah, Moor Row, Sellafield railway station, Millom, Workington railway station

==== Steam Hauled Railtour of Ravenglass and Rowrah, 15 March 1969 ====
Organiser: Stephenson Locomotive Society and Manchester Locomotive Society
Traction: Unknown
Formation: Unknown
Route: City of Lancaster, Carnforth, Grange-over-Sands, Plumpton Jn, Conishead Priory Branch, Plumpton Jn, Ulverston, Dalton-in-Furness, Askam and Ireleth (Askham), Foxfield railway station, Millom, Sellafield railway station, Egremont, Cumbria, Moor Row, Rowrah Jn, Arlecdon, Rowrah (14.02a ~ 14.12d), Moor Row, Corkickle, Whitehaven Preston Street Jn, Whitehaven Preston Street Goods, Whitehaven Preston Street Jn, Corkickle, St Bees, Ravenglass, Dalegarth for Boot railway station, Ravenglass, Carnforth, City of Lancaster

=== Rowrah Station and staff ===
Such was the ad hoc passenger traffic and special services that Rowrah railway station continued to be staffed until 1967, 36 years after passenger services officially ceased. Identified railway staff from Rowrah include:

- George Stoddart was the last station master at Rowrah serving from 1947 to May 1967, leaving into retirement.
- Samuel Hastings, railway clerk, married Miss Mary Ann Yates both of Rowrah – 18 March 1882

=== Closure ===
The line to the north of Rowrah (Wrights Green – Marron Junction) was lifted in 1964.

The route of the old Cleator and Workington Junction Railway ceased coal and coke traffic, for the general public on 14 August 1967, and regular goods, from 15 August 1966.

The signal box remained operational until 1967 at which point traffic had become so low that the whole of the line between Rowrah and Whitehaven was deemed as a single block (see British absolute block signalling) with point switching being carried out by the train driver / guard. The Rowrah No. 1 Signal box was the last surviving box of the Whitehaven, Cleator and Egremont Railway.

A stretch of the Cleator and Workington Junction Railway remained until October 1980 as the backshunt into Rowrah Hall quarry for the remaining goods traffic on the old route of the Whitehaven, Cleator and Egremont Railway. The backshunt ran from Rowrah almost as far as Arlecdon Station.

The line to the south of Rowrah continued to serve the Rowrah Hall / Eskett Quarry as the primary way to move Limestone until 23 March 1978 when the last Rowrah Limestone was sent to the Blast furnaces at Workington Ironworks. All private siding movements were suspended on 1 April 1978. The line was officially closed to traffic on 2 February 1980 and remained in place until October of the same year. The quarry remained open for two years after the departure of the railway with all Limestone being transported by road. During the rail removal process the track was lifted and loaded on to a train, the track being lifted behind it as it travelled back to Whitehaven. The train formation consisted of a British Rail Class 25 locomotive (25202 and 25036), two rail wagons and BR/LMS guards van. 25036 was the last locomotive to ever visit Rowrah.

== Mines, quarries, and natural resources ==
Rowrah is built on a large and very pure deposit of Limestone and from 1888 until the 1980s Limestone was quarried from at least one of the four quarries in Rowrah.

1. Rowrah Head Quarry (1888 to the 1980s)
2. Kelton Head Quarry (to 1950)
3. Salter Hall Quarry (to 1927)
4. Stockhow Hall Quarry (to 1909)

The remnants of all the quarries of Rowrah and the connecting trackbeds is clearly visible in this google map overlay

=== Rowrah Hall Quarry ===
Rowrah Hall Quarry, later called the Rowrah Quarry, was owned by Thomas Dixon of Rheda and at its peak employed 24 men with an average yield of 130 tons of limestone per day. Although owned by Thomas Dixon the quarry was leased to various parties throughout its productive life, some of the leases in date order are:-

- 5 January 1910, Lease of Rowrah Hall Limestone Quarry between 1) Thomas Dixon, Rheda and Florence Dixon, Lorton Hall and 2) the Workington Iron and Steel Company Limited
- 13 June 1939, Lease of the Rowrah Hall Quarry, Lamplugh, between 1) Henry Raven Courtenay Musgrave, Highbury, Stocksfield, Northumberland and Vera Owen Musgrave, Redcroft, Moor Crescent, Gosforth, Newcastle upon Tyne and 2) the United Steel Companies Limited

In the 1980s Rowrah Quarry was (owned? and) operated by Eskett Quarries Ltd.

==== Incidents ====
- 1 March 1897 – Accident with Explosives – 1 injured. The man was engaged in firing "pop" holes. He had lighted the fuse and retired to a safe distance. He was returning to the place after the shot had exploded, thinking all was safe, when he was struck on the head by a small stone.
- 19 January 1898 – Accident with explosives – 1 injured. Accident due to injured person's own reckless conduct. A vertical hole, 7 feet deep, was charged with gelatine dynamite with the view of merely "cracking" the rock. The shot-firer lit the fuse, and then proceeded to pour in some fine stemming, ramming it down with a copper tube. Explosion probably caused by this stemmer coming in contact with the detonator.
- 20 February 1900 – Accident with Explosives – one man injured. The injured man had moved away about 100 yards from the quarry face, and was watching the shot. It was snowing at the time, and this prevented him seeing clearly. (Gunpowder.)
- 23 February 1900 – Accident with Explosives – two men injured. A hole 10 feet deep, and containing a charge of 10 lbs. of powder, had missed fire on the previous day. The presumption is that the two men were unramming the hole when the explosion occurred. (Gunpowder.)
- 6 March 1914 – Fatality: Gilmore, Thomas, 6 March 1914, aged 38, Shot Firer. After firing a "shaking" shot on a ledge 12 feet from the quarry top, deceased returned to recharge the hole, and while in a stooping position a mass of rock, weighing several tons, fell from the quarry face and struck him, killing him instantly

=== Kelton Head Quarry ===
Kelton Head Quarry is located one mile to the east of the Rowrah, this was in active use until 1950. In the early 1960s Kelton Head quarry was purchased from the owner, farmer Joseph Wren, for £300 by Iredale Edgar for the purpose of converting it into the new home of The Cumbria Karting Club.

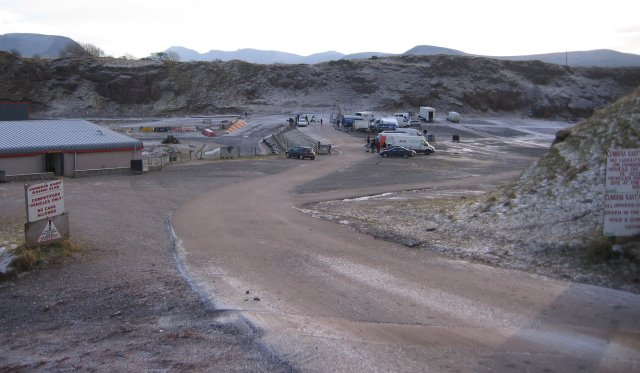
The Karting pits area Rowrah. – geograph.org.uk – 97267

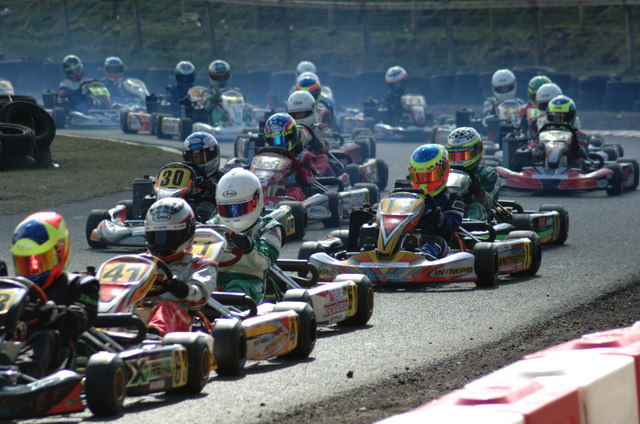
Kart racing at Rowrah – geograph.org.uk – 546522

=== Salter Hall Quarry ===
Salter Hall Quarry (to 1927) was used for the quarrying of limestone and was served by the Rowrah and Kelton Fell Railway. The quarry was owned by Salter Quarry Co. Ltd.

In 1922 it employed 47 people (36 workers, 11 office)

Although Rowrah Hall Quarry and Salter Hall Quarry were entirely separate, later quarrying activity and the eventual flooding of both has resulted in them now appearing as one single entity when viewed from the air. Although there is no documented evidence many locals are aware of the remnants of two tunnels between the two quarries. The earlier of the two tunnels had a narrow gauge track and the latter was sufficiently wide to allow the passage of road wagons. Eventually the two tunnels were used to create the open space between the two quarries.

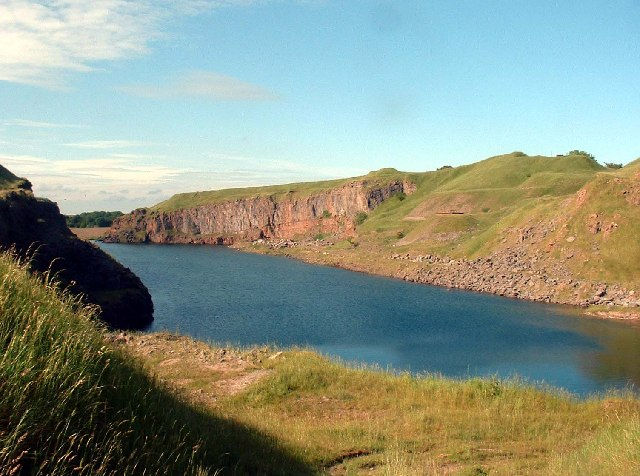
Salterhall Quarry, part of Rowrah Quarry – geograph.org.uk – 92808

==== Incidents ====
- 14 June 1900 – Accident with Explosives – one man injured. He was sheltering behind a bogie when he was struck by a stone, which rebounded from an angle of the quarry face. (Gunpowder.)

=== Stockhow Hall Quarry ===
Stockhow Hall Quarry (to 1909) was used for the quarrying of limestone and was served by the Rowrah and Kelton Fell Railway. The local name for Stockhow Hall Quarry was "Bainsey Wood Quarry".

=== Other geological interest ===
The soil in Rowrah often has a reddish colouring due to the high concentration of iron-ore.

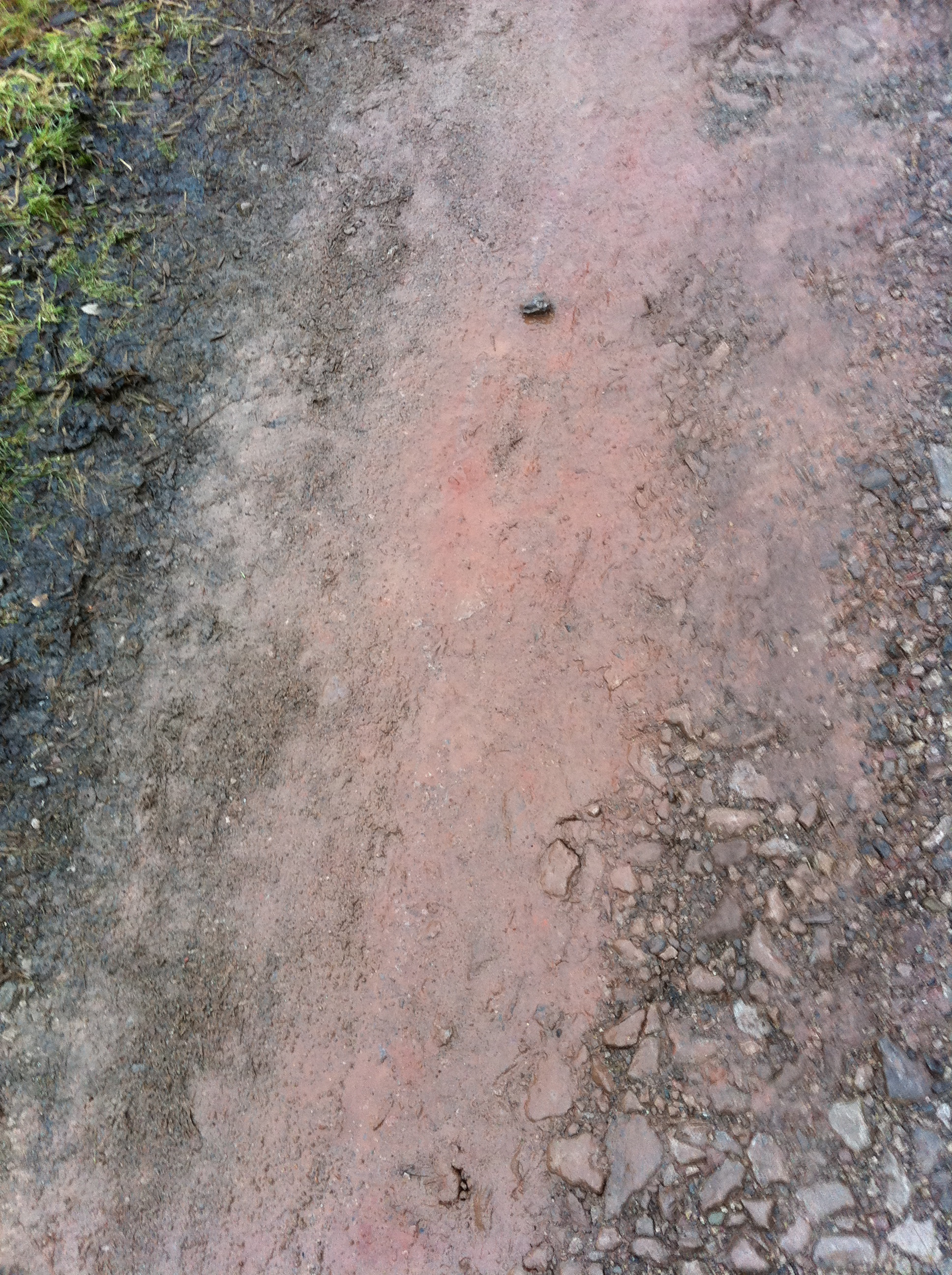
The soil in Rowrah, the red colouring is due to high concentrations of naturally occurring iron ore.

== Cycling ==
The disused railway in Rowrah now forms part of the 140-mile Sea to Sea Cycle Route (C2C) Cycle Route, Britain's 'most popular' "challenge" cycle route which is route 71 of the National Cycle Network. The cycle route between Rowrah and Whitehaven follows the disused railway line for its entire length.

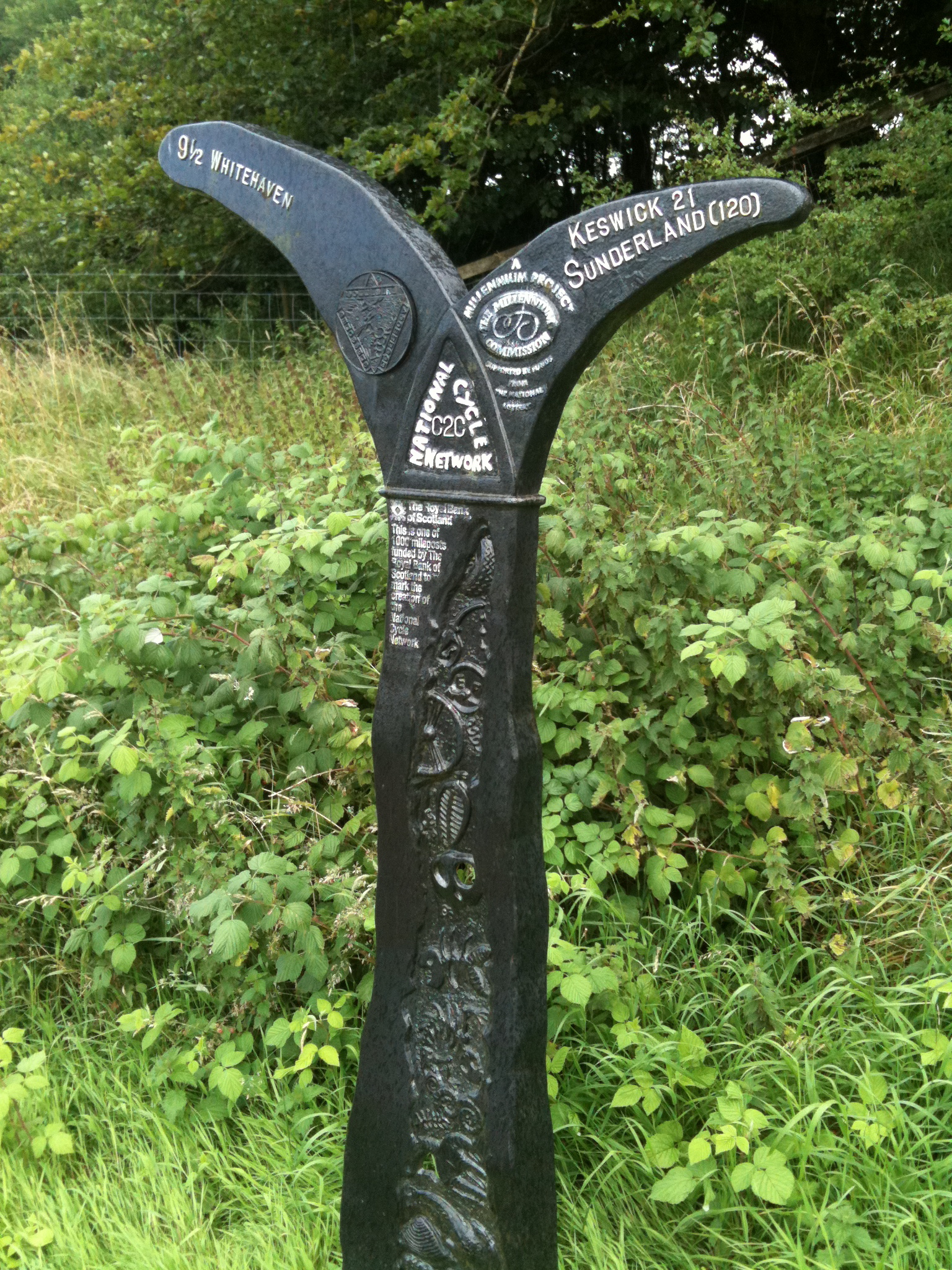
C2C (Route 71) Sign Post showing Whitehaven 91/2 Miles (all downhill), Keswick 21 Miles and Sunderland 120 Miles

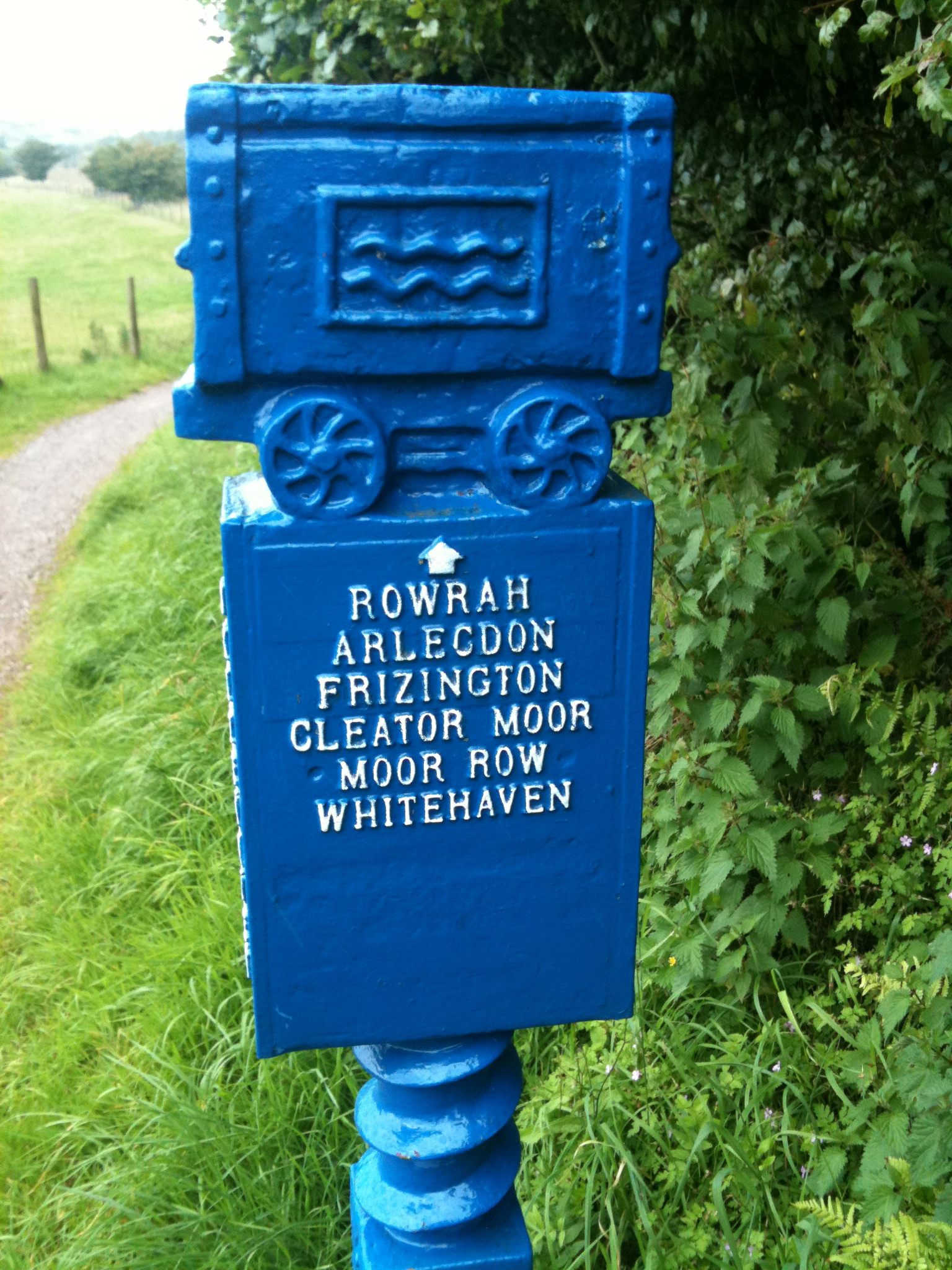
C2C Milepost showing Rowrah, Arlecdon, Frizington, Cleator Moor, Moor Row and Whitehaven. At the top of the post is a depiction of a quarry rail cart used to move iron-ore and limestone.

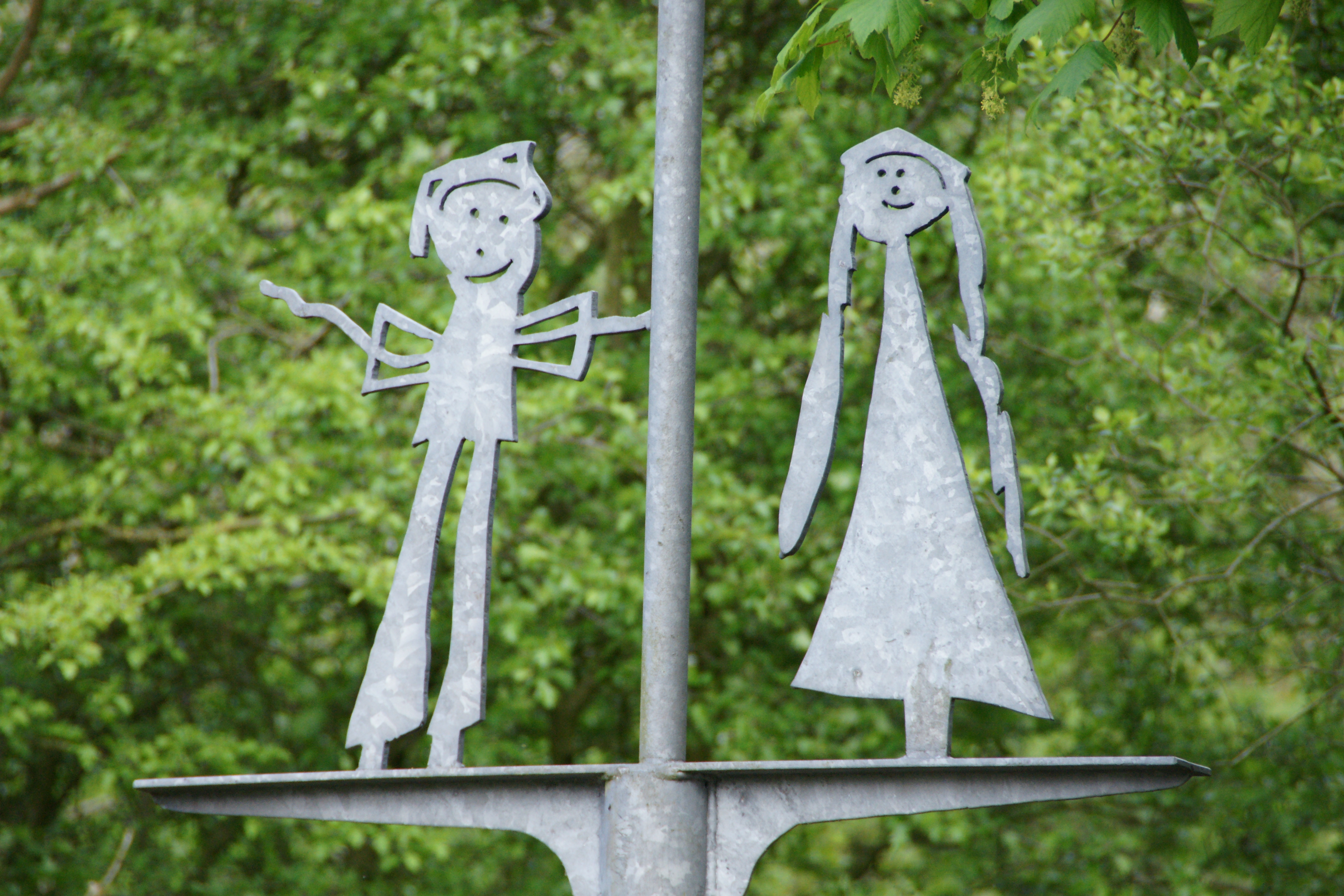
A typical sculpture on the C2C cycle route at Rowrah

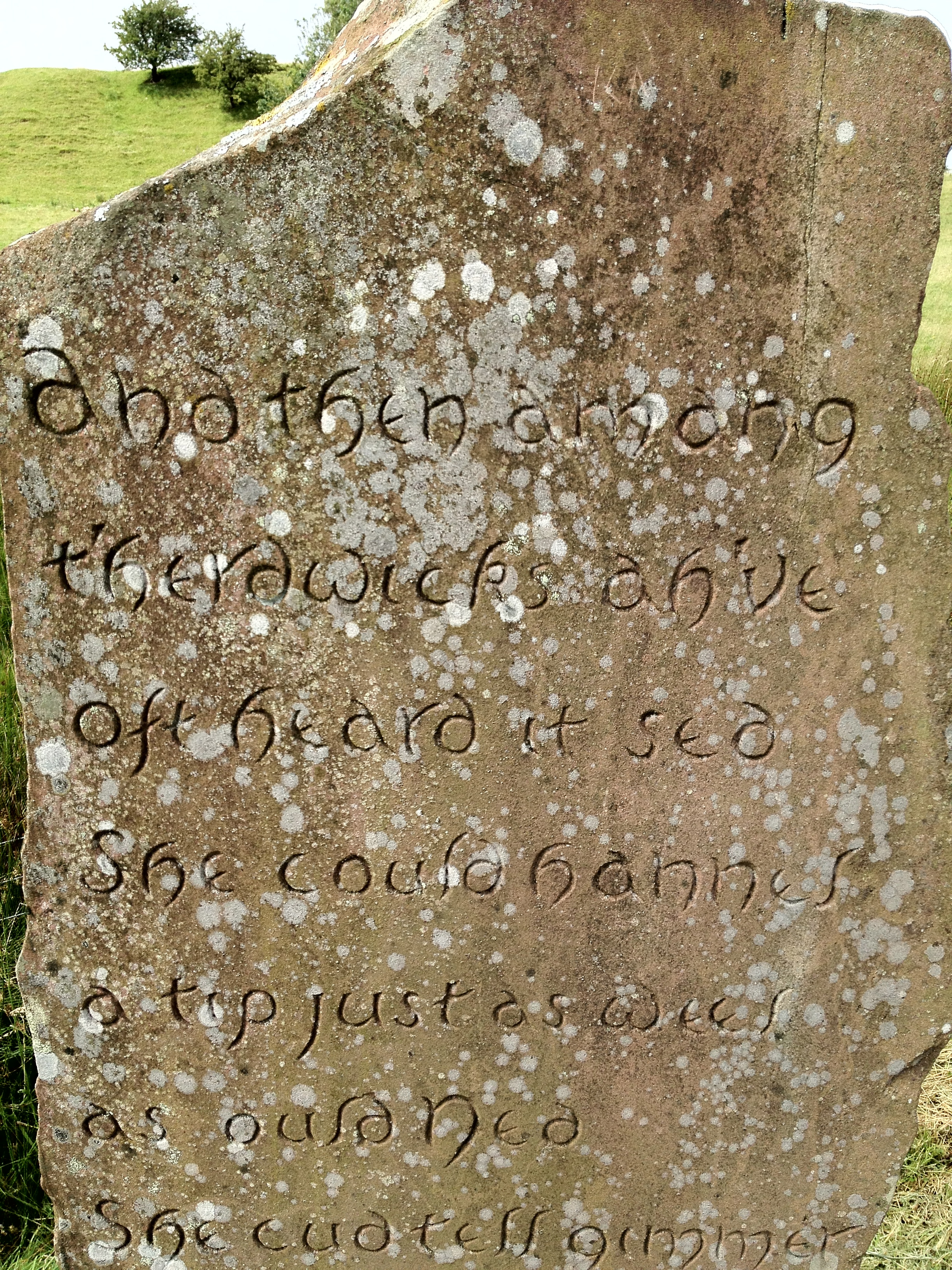
A stone with Cumbrian Dialect writing, Rowrah on the route of the Rowrah and Kelton Fell Railway. "and then among t'herdwicks ah've oft heard it sed she could hannel a tip just as weel as owld Ned. She culd tell gimmer...."

== Notable buildings ==
=== Rowrah Hall ===
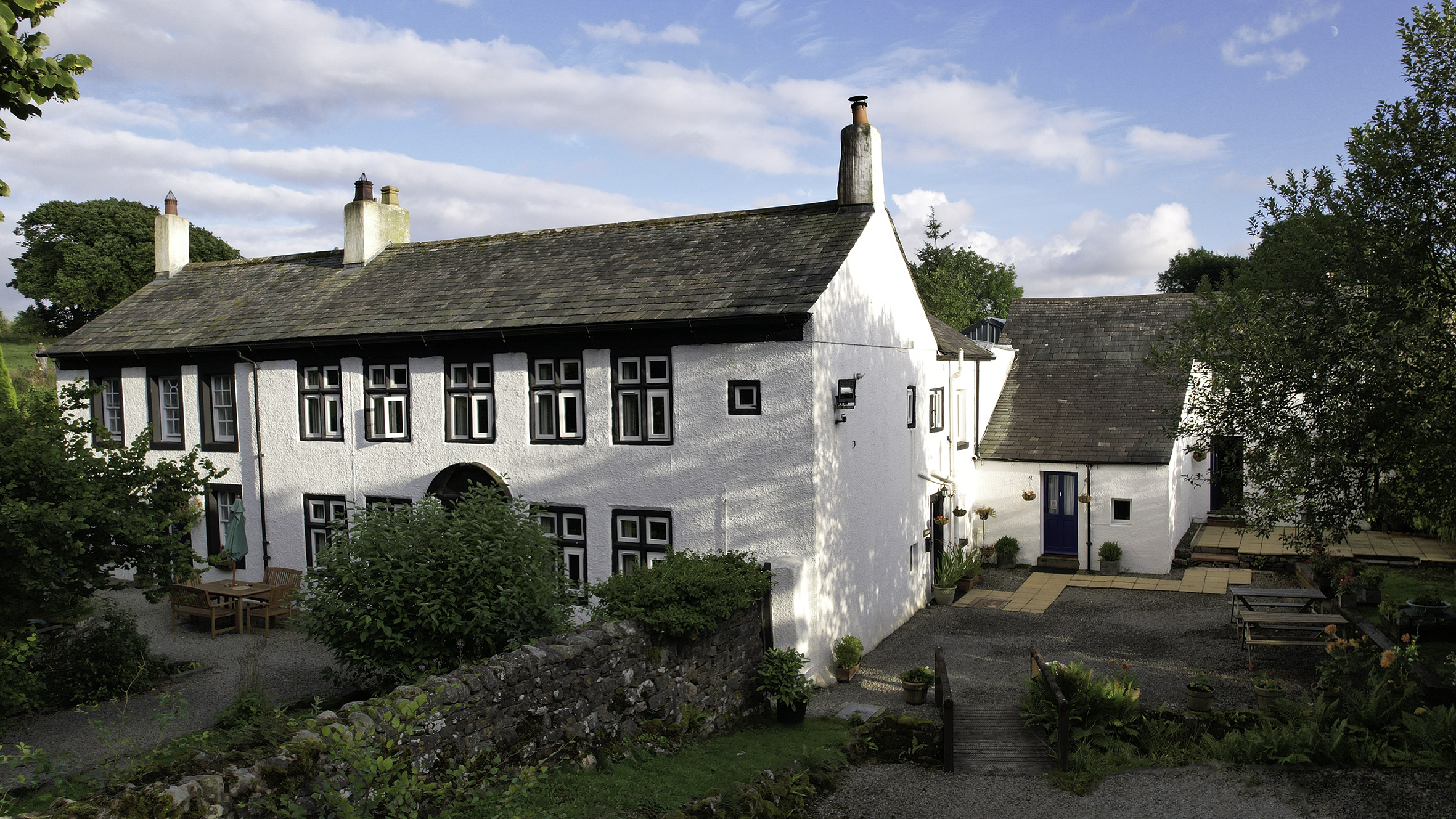

Brief History to Present Day

Rowrah Hall is a fine, imposing Grade II listed building, originally built in 1703 during the reign of Queen Anne, and was the home of John Skelton. The property was extended in 1729 and the next few generations made it their home. At some point c.1800's, the Skelton's left to live in London and the Hall saw various tenants, before being sold by the family in the 1930s.

The Hall and estate were bought by a local farmer, but its upkeep was neglected and for a number of years, it lay derelict. It was bought and renovated in the 1980s when it became a field centre, until 2001. Later it was completely renovated and was transformed into a charming guest house. The adjoining cottage, The Old Hayloft, which is within Rowrah Hall's curtilage, was given a separate title c.2003 and later converted to boutique holiday cottages.

The property remains in private ownership, having been sold in 2021 and continues to flourish under its new stewards. The building is almost in its original "as built" form and can be seen from the C2C Cycle Route at Rowrah, which runs alongside the Hall's three-acre estate. Over 7,000 tulip bulbs were planted in 2021, creating a spectacular display in the Spring time. The gateway to Rowrah Hall was originally located directly on the main road but was altered in 1861 with the arrival of the railway. Access to Rowrah hall is via two disused railway bridges that were underfilled in the 1990s.

Natural Water Source

A natural spring within the grounds, feeds two ponds and is the source of Windergill Beck, feeding into the River Ehen, which supports the largest freshwater pearl mussel Margaritifera population in England, and is designated a Special Area of Conservation (SAC).

Grade II Listing

Rowrah Hall was given Grade II listed status on 9 March 1967 and is a traditional Cumberland farmhouse design of five bays, made of rendered limestone, with local slate roof and originally had sandstone mullions and transoms to the windows throughout. The Listing gives its building as 1705, from a date on the barns (now gone), but from the evidence of a carved oak cupboard, it was probably built in 1703. It had two large inglenook fireplaces, one of which survives, and a comparatively large number of windows (expensive at the time).

Queen Anne to King George

The extension in 1729 was built in part, to accommodate Richard Skelton's growing family and there is a marked contrast in style between the Queen Anne design of the original house and the Georgian style of the newer. Richard was the eldest son of John, and also built the massive gate piers (also listed), with large acorns on top, and the walled garden. At the time, there was a long drive straight up to the main road, where the entrance was marked by two beech trees (cut down about 1980). Richard died in the late eighteenth century, while his wife Deborah lived on into her late 90's.

The original Ordnance Survey maps of the coincided with the building of the first railway in the 1805's: the Whitehaven, Cleator and Egremont. It shows that "Rowrah" is simply Rowrah Hall, Rowrah Hall Farm and Rowrah Head. It is possible that Rowrah Hall was the only building in Rowrah during the early 1700s.

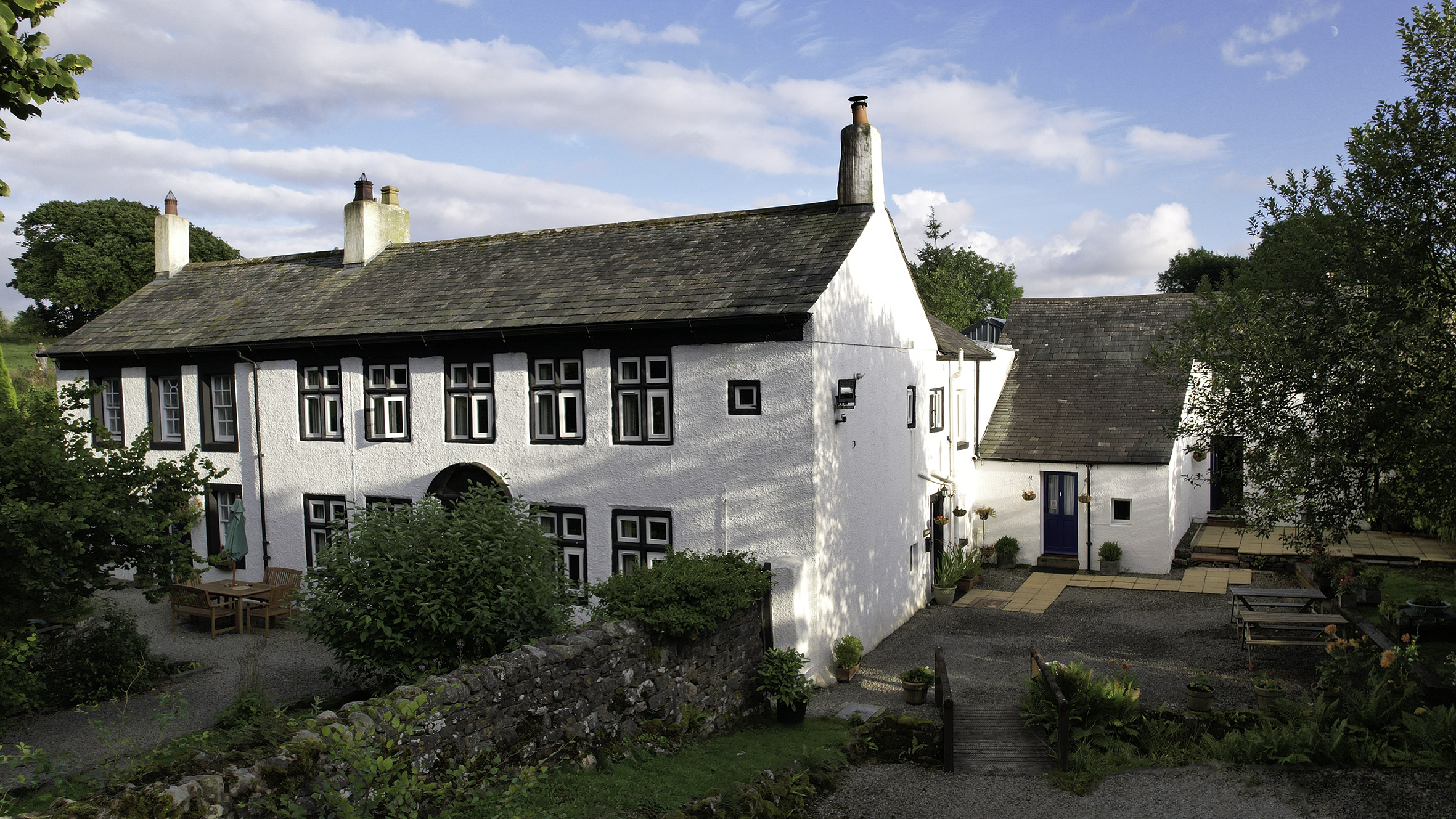
Rowrah Hall with The Old Hayloft and Walled Garden (August 2021).

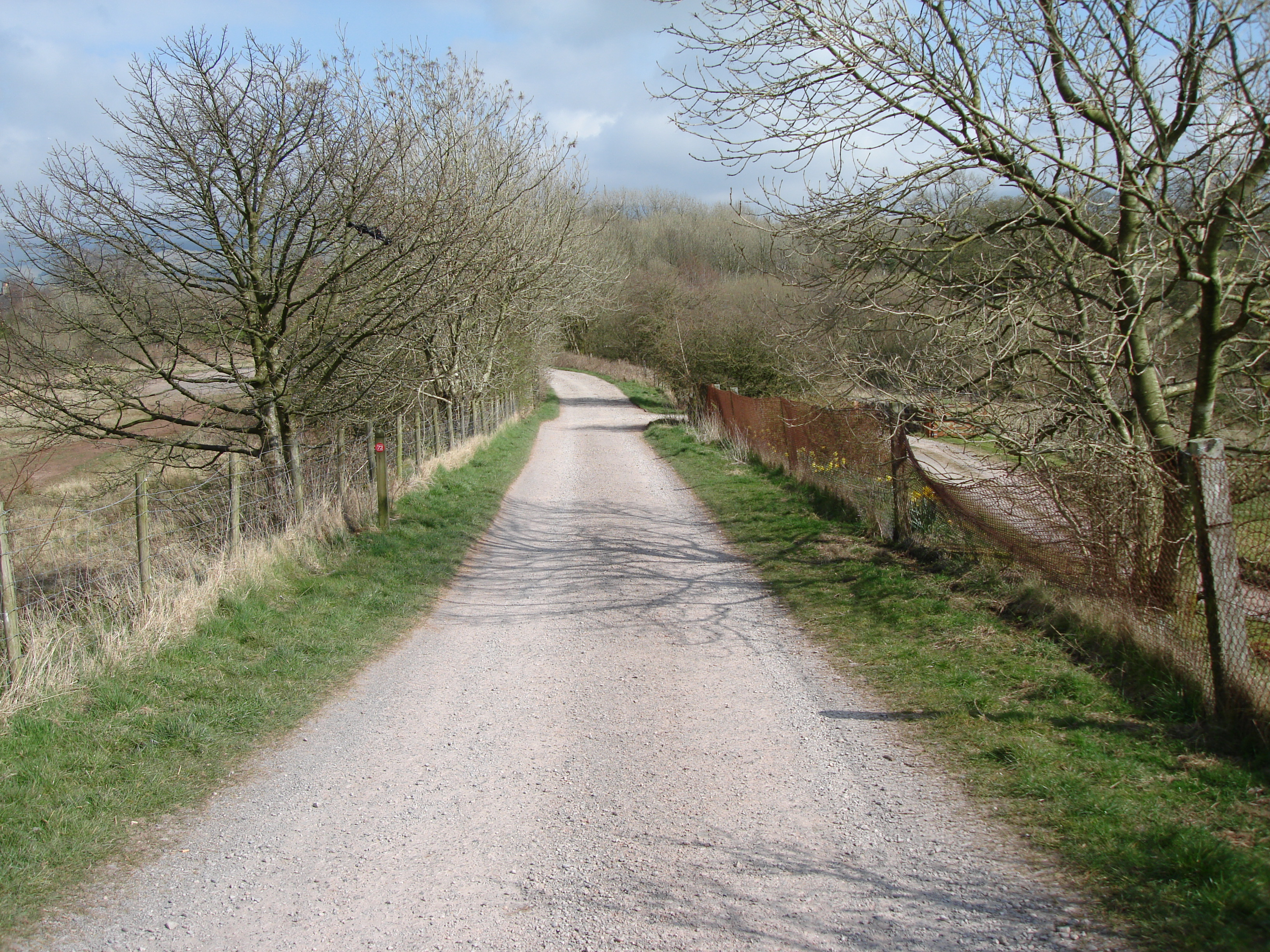
C2C Cycle Route with access to Rowrah Hall on the right.

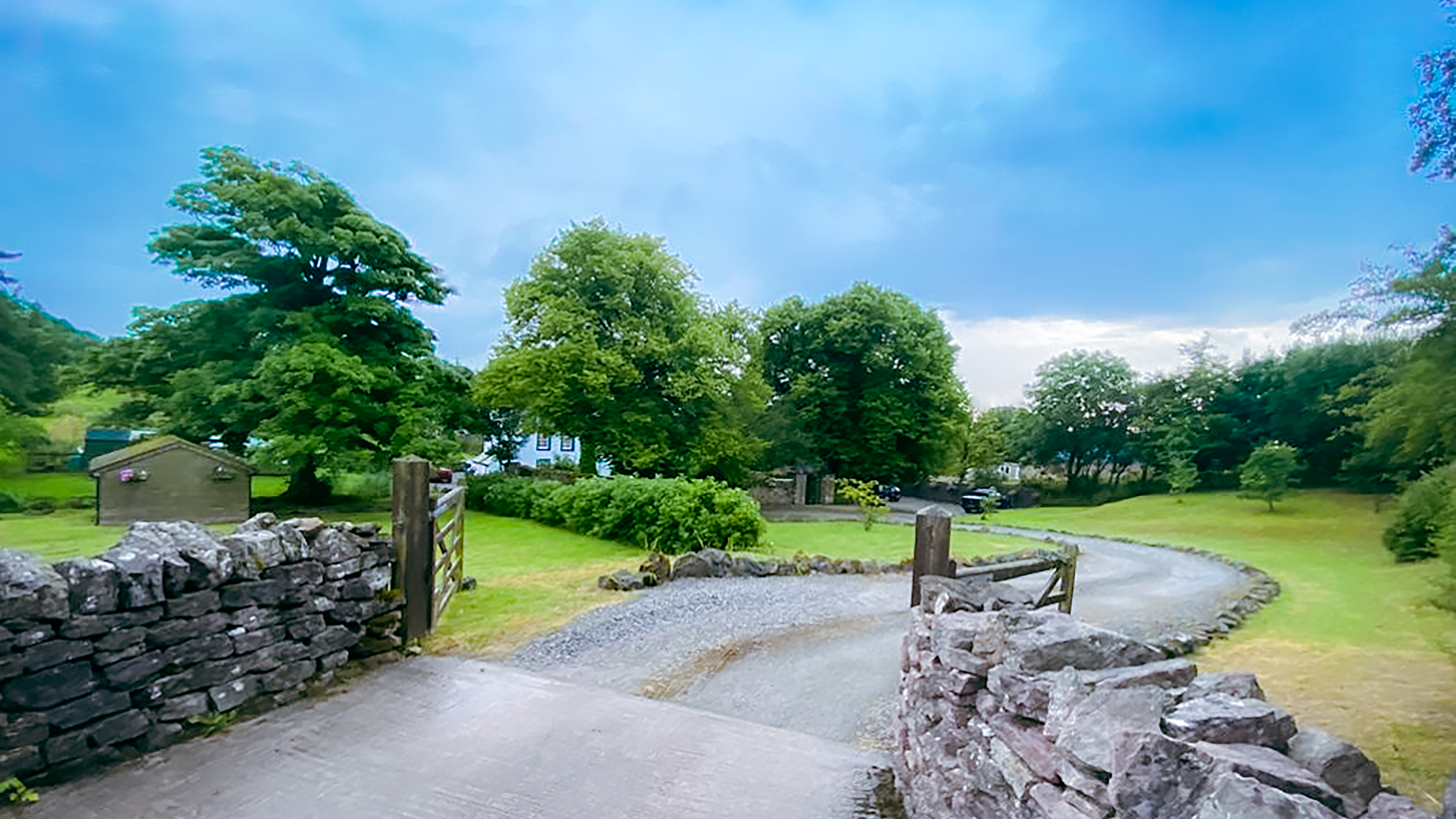
Rowrah Hall from C2C Cycle Route (Aug 2021).

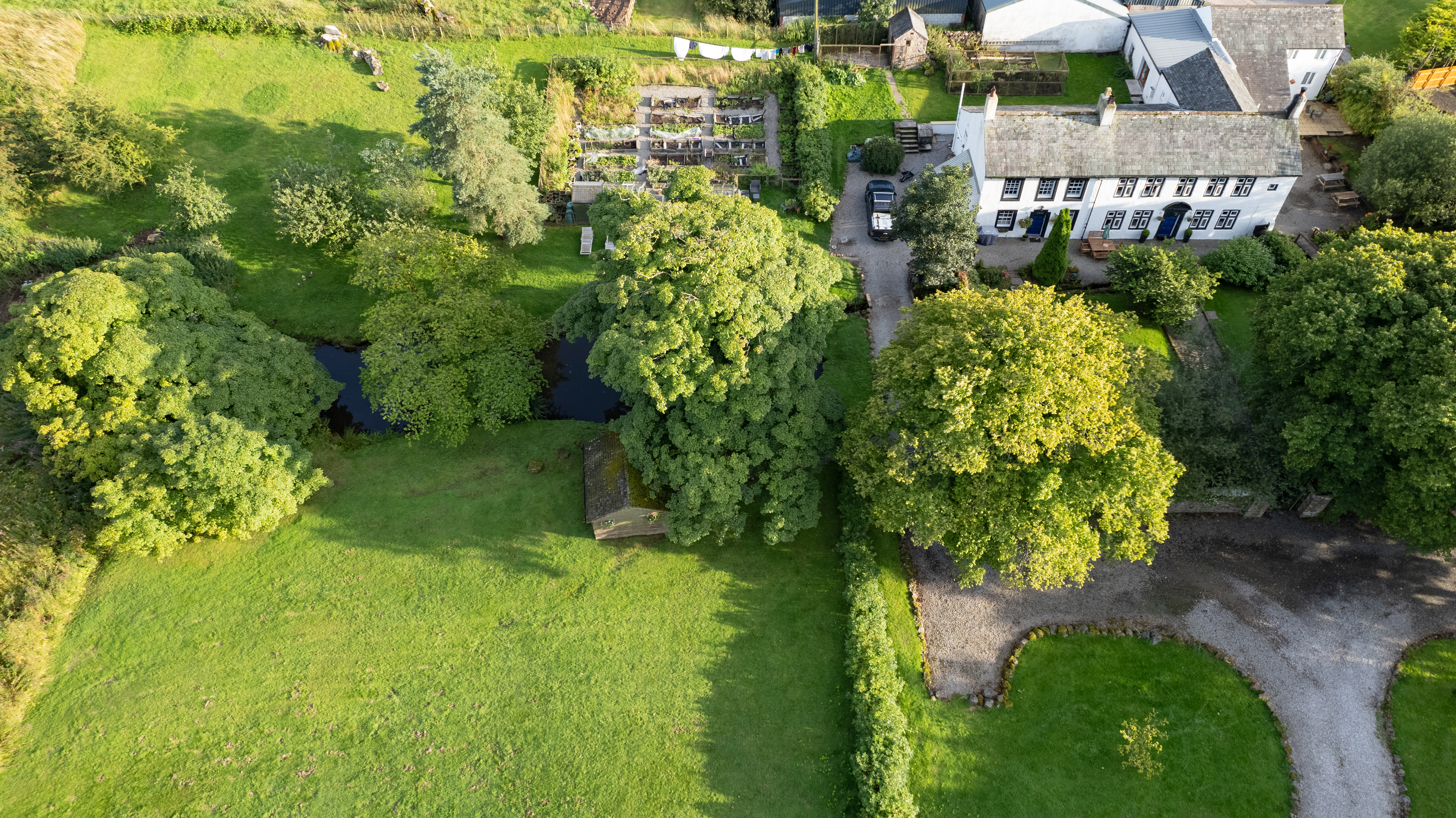
Rowrah Hall from Above (August 2021).

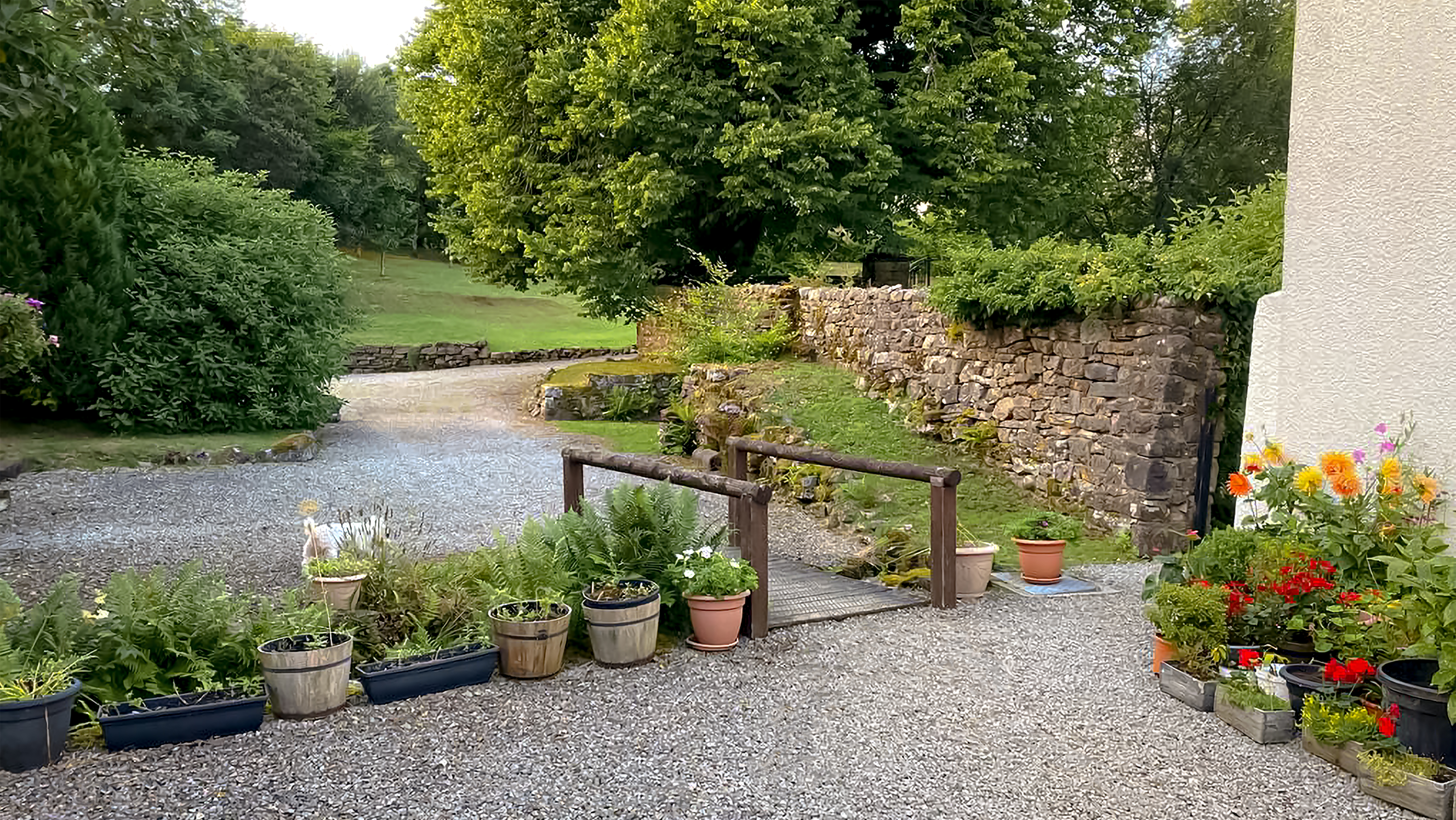
Rowrah Hall, looking up to C2C Cycle Route (August 2021).

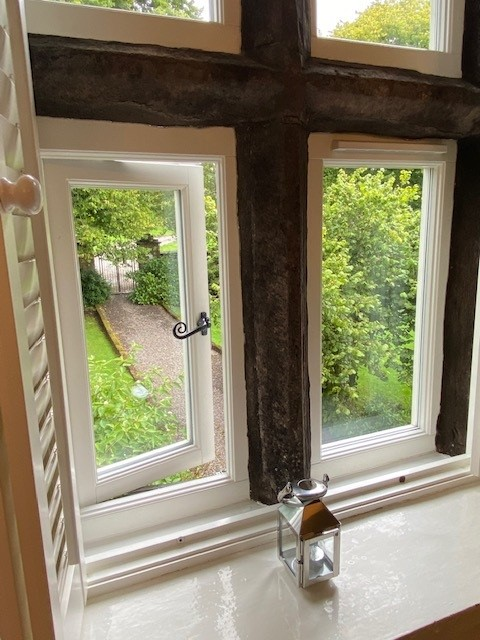
Original sandstone mullion and transom windows (August 2021).

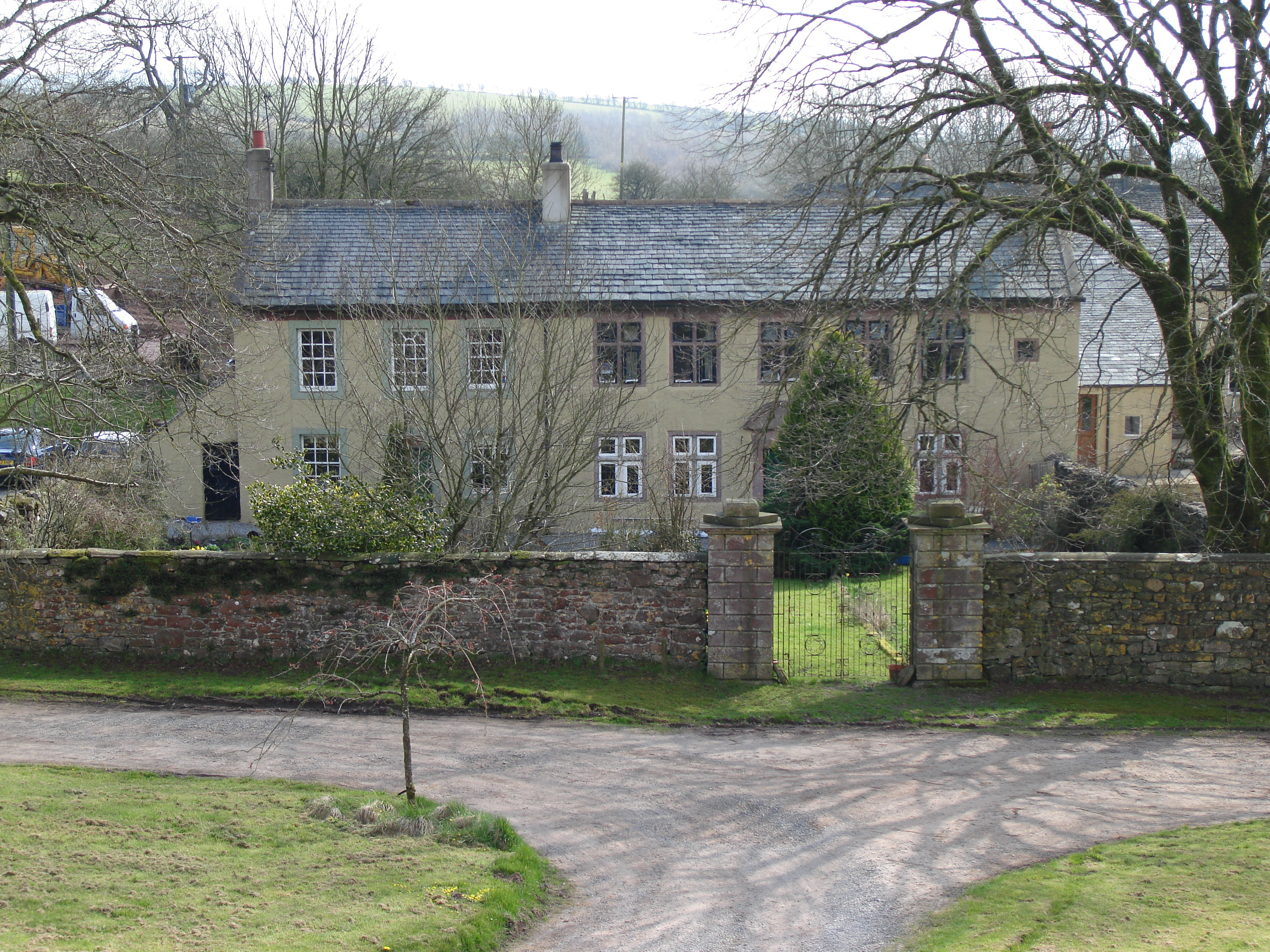
Rowrah Hall as viewed from the C2C cycle route / access road (April 2007)

=== The Shop ===
Located at 9 Rowrah Road the shop was the last general retail premises in Rowrah, now closed and a private residence. Previously it was a Fish and Chip shop.

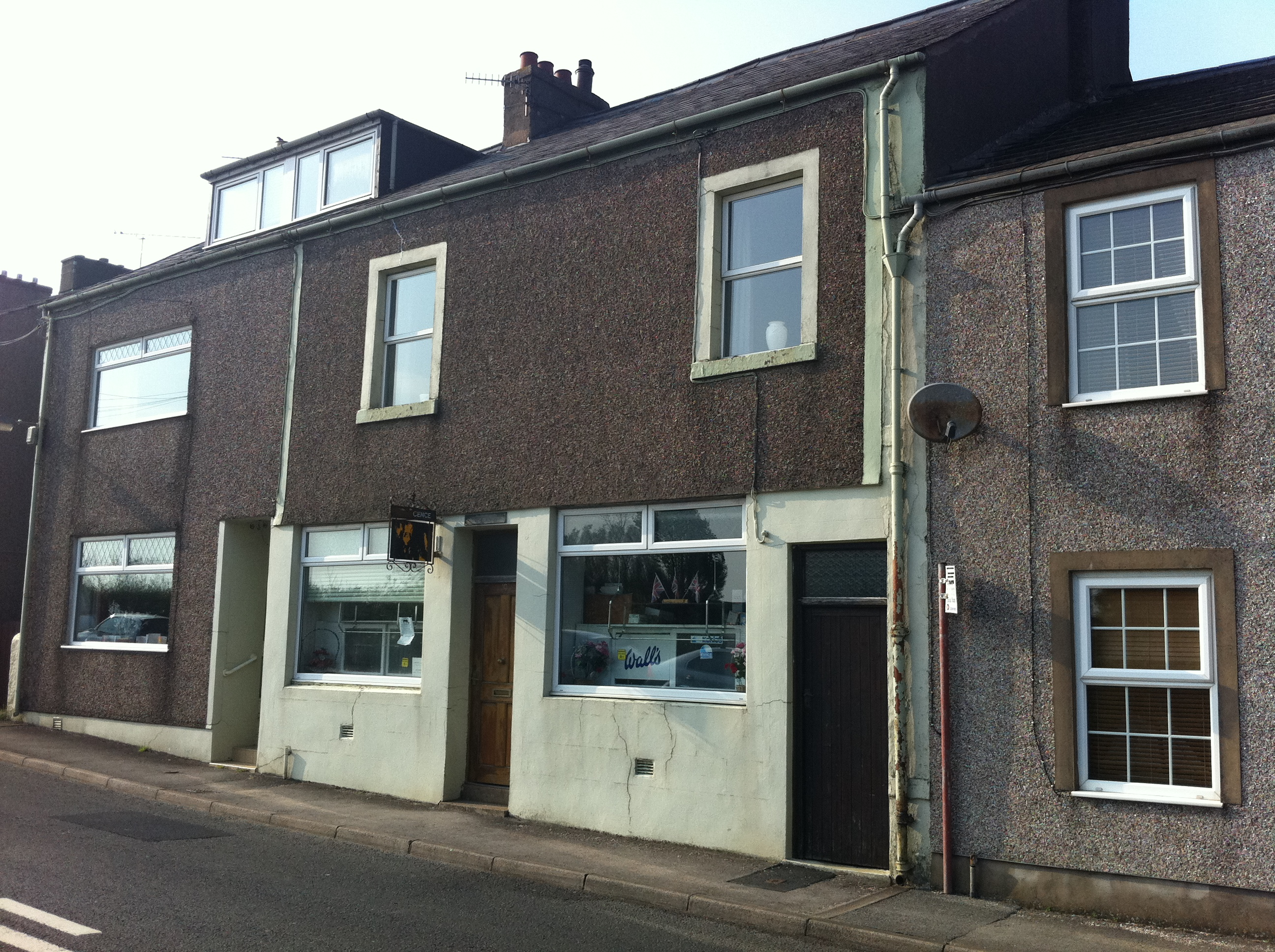
The shop on Rowrah Road, now a private residence. The premise was previously a Fish and Chip shop. The bus stop to the right is no longer used.

=== The Doctors House ===
The doctors house is one of the largest houses in the original row of terraced houses on Rowrah Road, it is detached and set back from the other houses in the row.

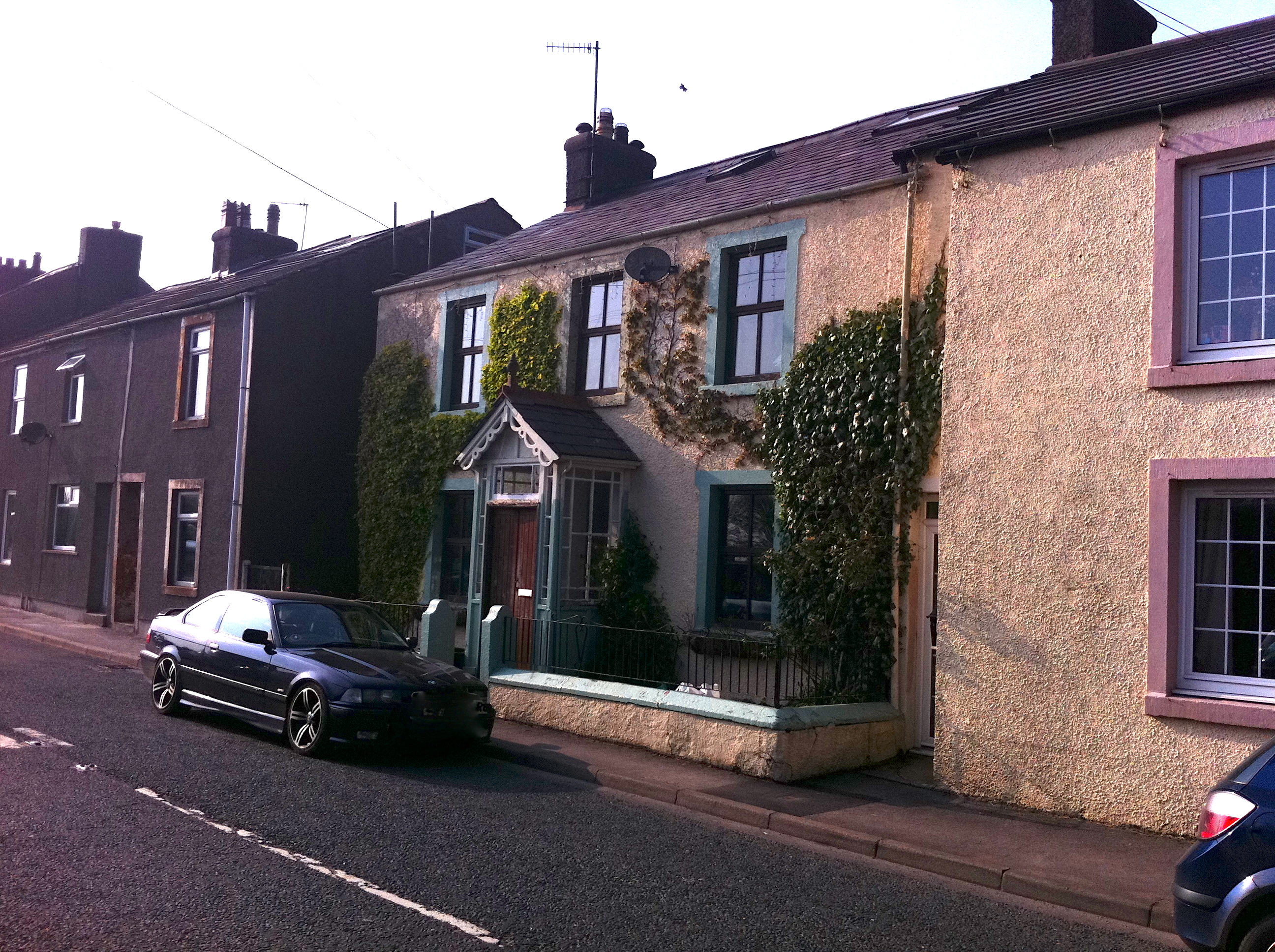
The Doctors House, Rowrah. Now a private residence.

=== Rowrah Chapel ===
In 1895 a 300 capacity Wesleyan Chapel was constructed from part rendered local sandstone, now a private residential property.

=== The Cooperative ===
The Cooperative building has had many uses. As the Cooperative it was a funeral parlour. In the mid-1970s it was used as a jewellery shop called Magnus Maximus Designs. It is now a private residence under the name of Magnus House.

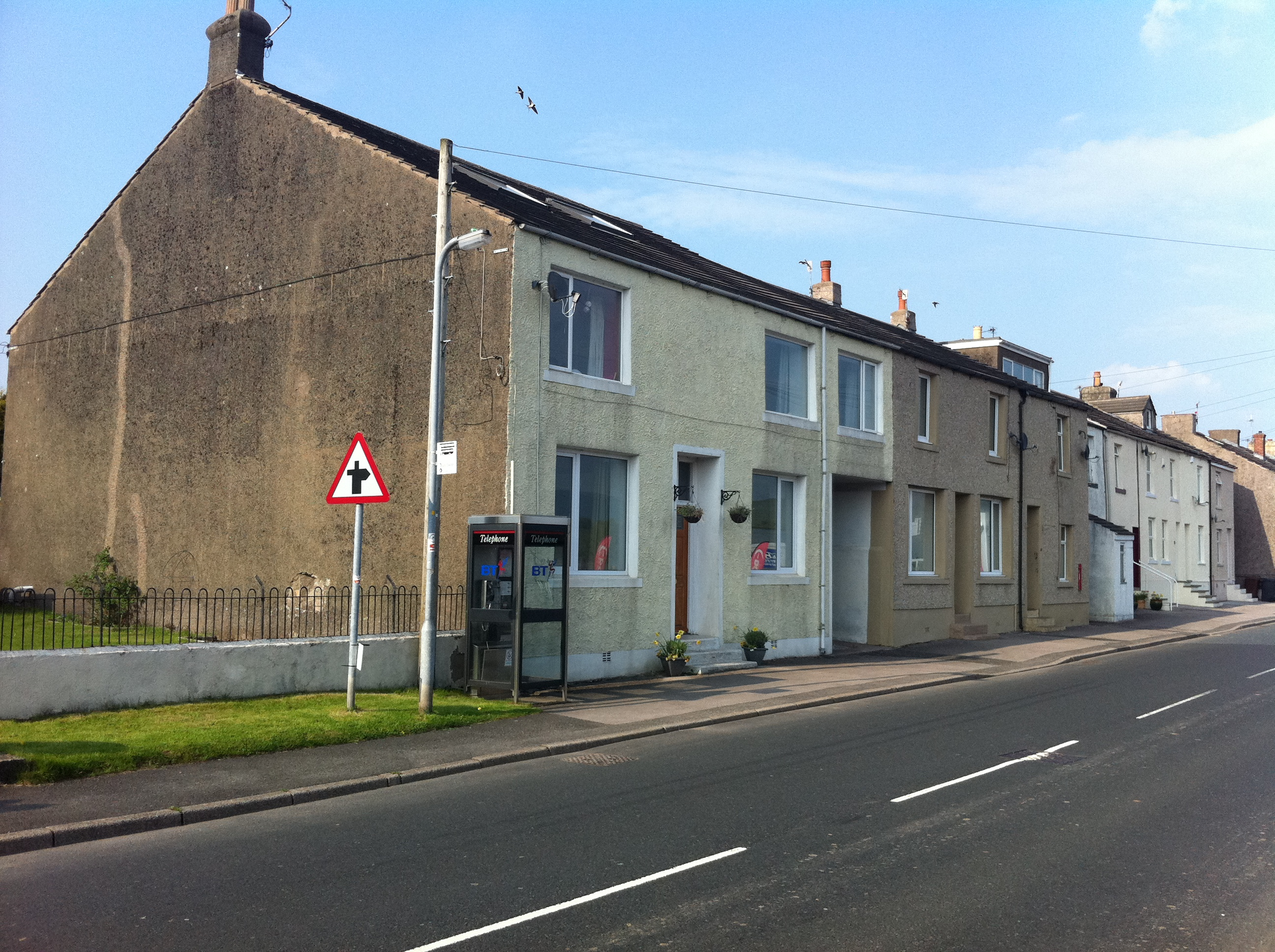
The old Cooperative, Rowrah. Now a private residence.

=== The Railway Hotel ===
The Railway Hotel, located at 49 Rowrah Road, was the property of the Jennings Brewery, Cockermouth. The property was leased to various landlords throughout its life under Jennings Brewery ownership, some of the tenants included:-

- Joseph Cameron Boyd: Railway Hotel, Rowrah – 1924
- William Joseph Brough: Railway Hotel, Rowrah – 1928

The Railway Hotel underwent alterations in 1955–1956 while remaining under the ownership of the Jennings Brewery.

Additional National archive records, held in Cumbria Record Office and Local Studies Library, Whitehaven, indicate the sale of The Railway Hotel in 1956 The Railway Hotel is now a private residence.

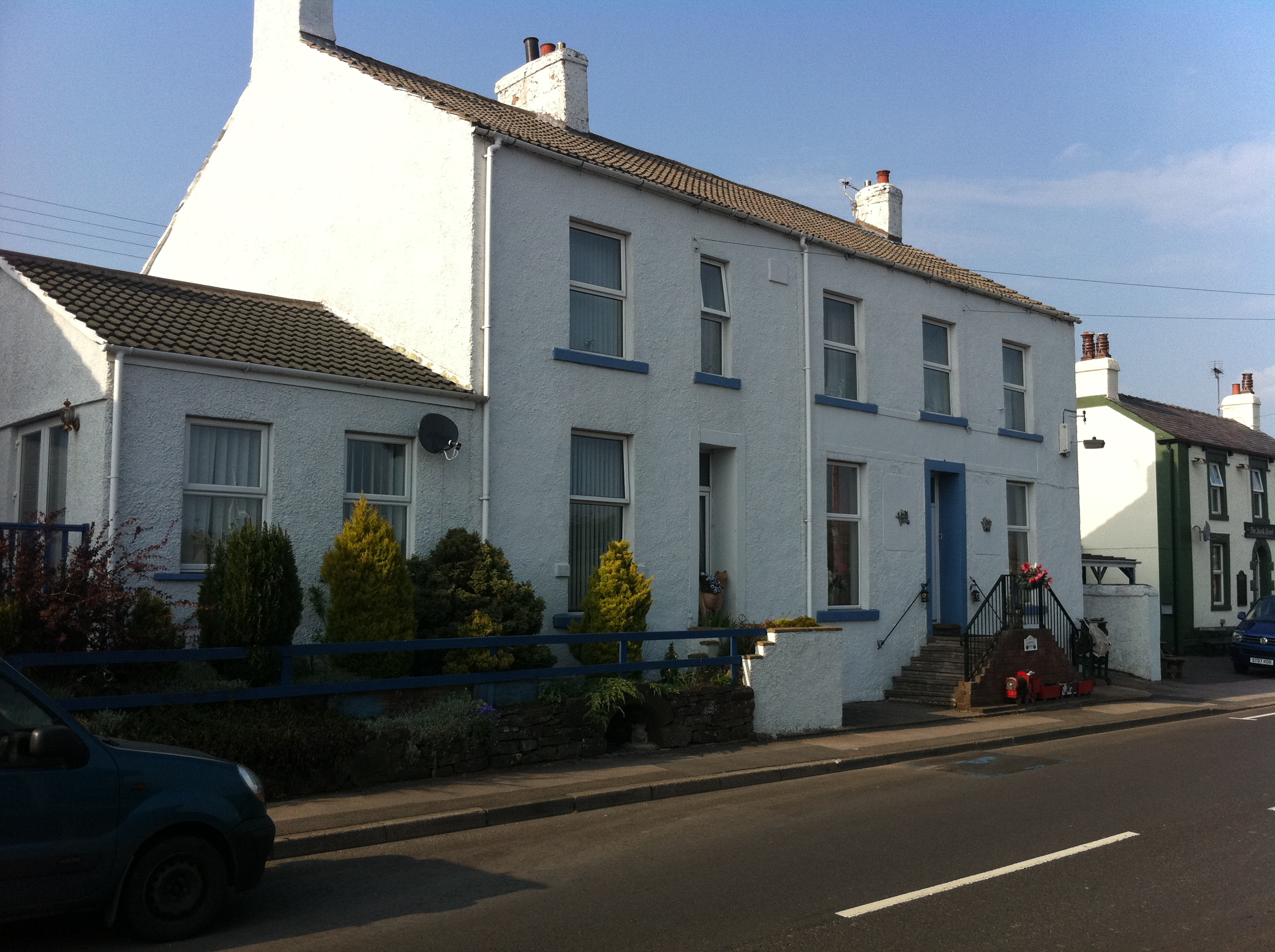
The Railway Hotel, Rowrah. Now a private residence

After nearly 160 years, following the death of Noreen Dockeray (owner of 40 years), The Railway Hotel and its Ostler's cottage are now separate properties and owned by 2 separate families.

=== The Stork Hotel ===
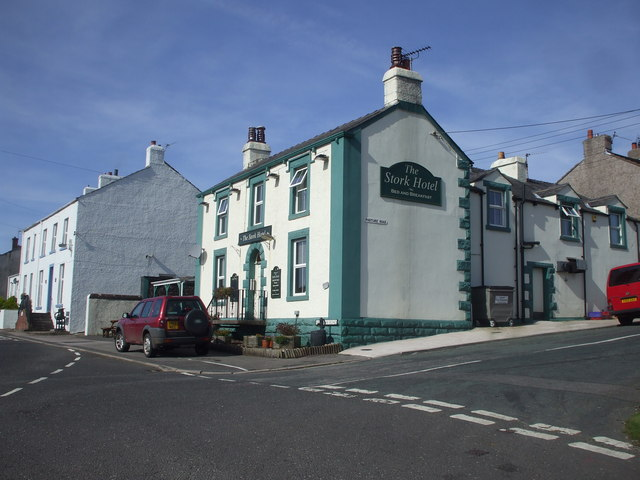
The Stork Hotel, was the last remaining public house and hotel in Rowrah. The white building to the left of The Stork Hotel is The Railway Hotel, now a private residence.

The Stork Hotel Rowrah is located on the corner of Rowrah Road and Pasture Road.

There are archive records regarding The Stork Hotel as follows:-

- Sale particulars, copy deeds and papers relating to the acquisition of the Stork Hotel, Rowrah – 1932–1933

The Stork Hotel was the last remaining public house and hotel in Rowrah, when it closed in January 2022. It is now a private residence.

== Notable people ==
- Paul Dale, the first CTO to be appointed to the management board at ITV plc, biggest commercial television network in the UK.
- Derrick Bird, the gunman responsible for the Cumbria shootings in 2010, lived at 26 Rowrah Road.

== Religion ==
Rowrah for many years was a religious hub for the surrounding area and in 1895 a 300-capacity Wesleyan chapel was constructed. This chapel later became a Methodist church for the local community until declining numbers forced the closure and sale of the property. The chapel is now a private residence.

Many of the Wesleyan meetings were documented and some have been transcribed available online.

The Reading Room was established in 1896; the members, who numbered about 40, subscribed for 2d. weekly.

4 items from the "Wesleyan Chapel Rowrah" are part of the local historical collection housed at The Beacon in Whitehaven. These items are:-

1. BWHHMG:1997.47.5, Cup, White china tea cup, black transfer printed inscription "Wesleyan Chapel Rowrah", thin gold band of decoration around rim.
2. WHHMG:1997.47.6, Saucer, White china saucer, black transfer printed inscription "Wesleyan Chapel Rowrah", thin gold band of decoration around edge.
3. WHHMG:1997.47.7, Plate, White china tea plate, black transfer printed inscription "Wesleyan Chapel Rowrah", thin gold band of decoration around edge.
4. WHHMG:1997.47.8, Plate, White china dinner plate, black transfer printed inscription "Wesleyan Chapel Rowrah", thin gold band of decoration around edge.

== Wildlife ==
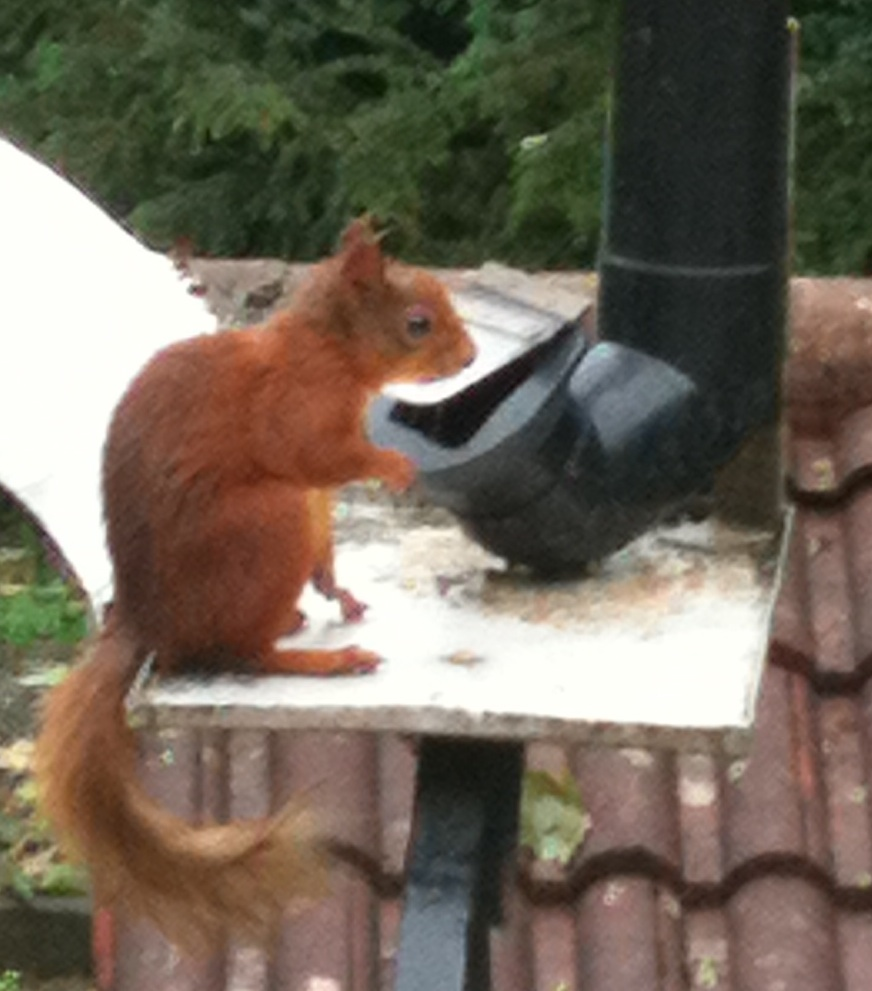
A rare Red Squirrel spotted raiding a bird table in Rowrah, Cumbria

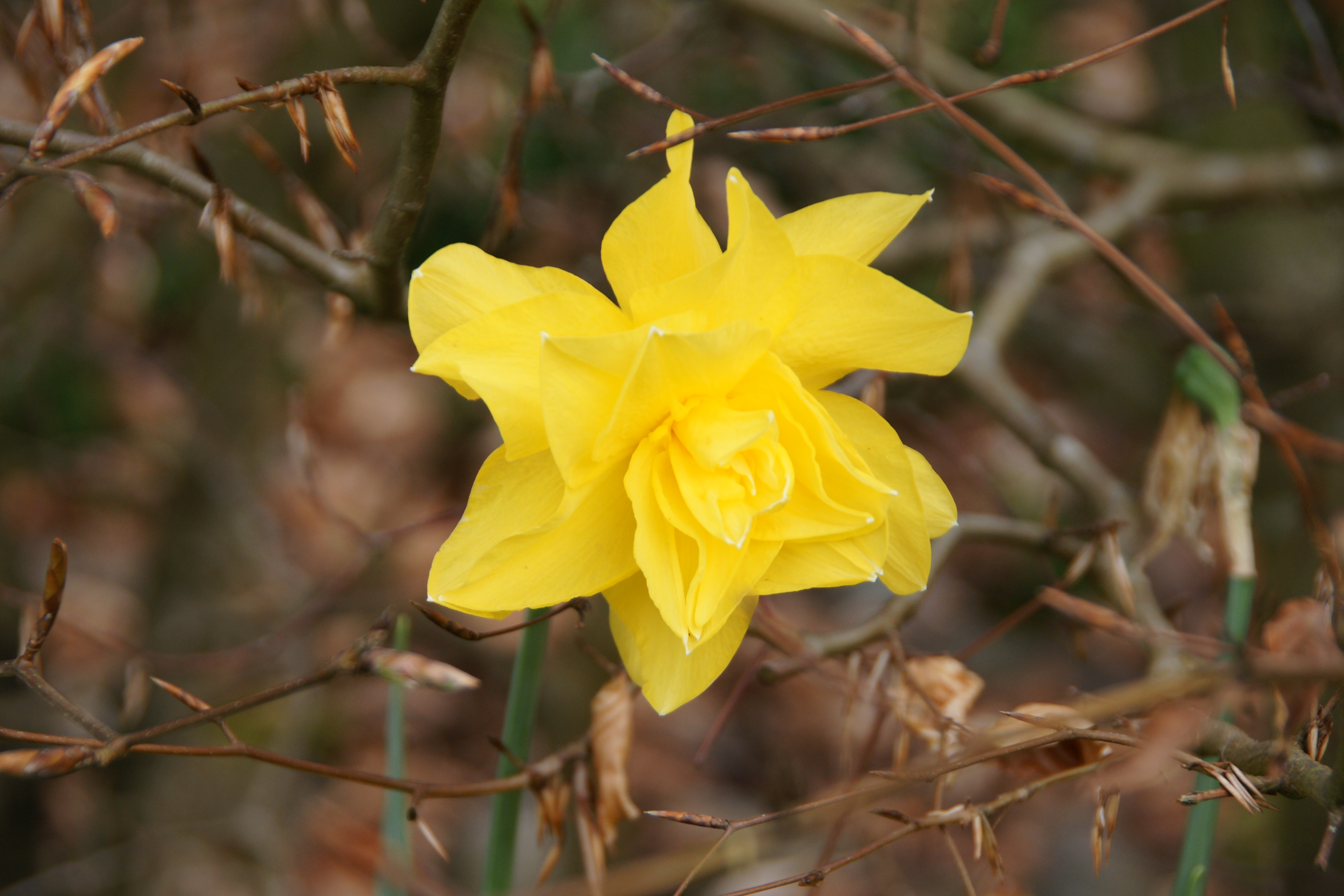
During March, like many Cumbrian villages, Rowrah is awash with the bright yellow of Daffodils

Rowrah is a rural village and has diverse wildlife, including wild deer, cuckoo, barn owl, fox, red squirrel, smooth newt, hare, and rabbit. Rowrah has a pair of nesting peregrine falcons, in April 2009 they made the national headlines when a pigeon laced with poison was used in an attempt to poison them.

To the south-east of Rowrah, along the C2C cycle route prior to Sheriffs Gate there is High Leys, which has been designated a national nature reserve. The status of national nature reserve was awarded to High Leys due to its meadow status and the traditional hay-making and grazing methods employed during the land's working lifetime.

In 2010 there were sightings of a large black cat, local myth often refers to such unknown creatures as "Boggles".

== Post Office ==
The nearest Post Office is at Arlecdon.

== See also ==
- Listed buildings in Arlecdon and Frizington
