= Arlecdon and Frizington =

Civil parish in Cumbria, England

Coordinates: 54.556°N 3.471°W

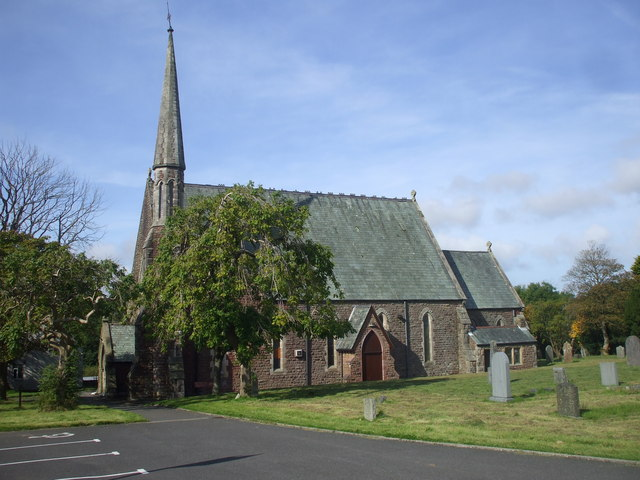
- St Paul's Church, Frizington

- Location within Cumbria
- Population: 3,493 (Parish, 2021)
- OS grid reference: NY0316
- Civil parish: Arlecdon and Frizington
- Unitary authority: Cumberland
- Ceremonial county: Cumbria
- Region: North West
- Country: England
- Sovereign state: United Kingdom
- Post town: FRIZINGTON
- Postcode district: CA26
- Dialling code: 01946
- Police: Cumbria
- Fire: Cumbria
- Ambulance: North West
- UK Parliament: Whitehaven and Workington

Arlecdon and Frizington is a civil parish in the Cumberland district of Cumbria, England. The parish includes Arlecdon, Frizington, Rowrah and Asby.

== History ==
Arlecdon was an ancient parish within the historic county of Cumberland. The parish was subdivided into three townships: Frizington, Whillimoor, and an Arlecdon township which covered the area around the village and parish church and also included Asby.

In 1882, a local government district called Arlecdon and Frizington was created, covering those two townships. The Arlecdon and Frizington district was enlarged in 1894 to take in the Whillimoor township, after which the Arlecdon and Frizington district covered the whole parish of Arlecdon. Later that year, local government districts were reconstituted as urban districts under the Local Government Act 1894.

In 1919 John Adams led a successful election challenge to the sitting members of Arlecdon and Frizington District Council. This established the first all-Labour council to be elected in England. Adams held the office of Chairman of the Arlecdon and Frizington Urban District Council from 1919 to 1923.

Arlecdon and Frizington Urban District was abolished in 1934. The parish of Arlecdon it had covered was renamed Arlecdon and Frizington, given a parish council, and reclassified as a rural parish within the Ennerdale Rural District. Ennerdale Rural District was abolished in 1974, becoming part of the Borough of Copeland in the new county of Cumbria. Copeland was in turn abolished in 2023 when the new Cumberland Council was created, also taking over the functions of the abolished Cumbria County Council in the area.

== Governance ==
There are two tiers of local government covering Arlecdon and Frizington, at civil parish and unitary authority level: Arlecdon and Frizington Parish Council and Cumberland Council. The parish council generally meets at St Joseph's Community Hall in Frizington.

Arlecdon and Frizington is within the Whitehaven and Workington UK parliamentary constituency, which has been represented by Josh MacAlister of the Labour Party since the 2024 general election.

== Demography ==
The population of the parish was 3,493 at the 2021 census. This continued a decline from the previous two censuses. The parish had a population of 3,678 in the 2001 census, decreasing to 3,607 at the 2011 census.

== See also ==
- Listed buildings in Arlecdon and Frizington
- John Adams, 1st Baron Adams
