= Listed buildings in Arlecdon and Frizington =

Arlecdon and Frizington is a civil parish in the Cumberland district, Cumbria, England. It contains seven listed buildings that are recorded in the National Heritage List for England. Of these, one is listed at Grade II*, the middle of the three grades, and the others are at Grade II, the lowest grade. The parish contains the villages of Arlecdon, Rowrah and Frizington, and the surrounding countryside. The oldest listed building is a medieval cross, which is also a scheduled monument. The other listed buildings are a church and associated structures, a country house and its gate piers, and a former stable block.

== Key ==
| Grade | Criteria |
|---|---|
| II* | Particularly important buildings of more than special interest |
| II | Buildings of national importance and special interest |

== Buildings ==
| Name and location | Photograph | Date | Notes | Grade |
|---|---|---|---|---|
| Cross Lacon; 54.53588°N 3.50862°W | — | 13th century (probable) | A medieval wheel-head cross about 4 metres (13 ft) high, that was moved to its present site in 1911. It is in sandstone and has a square plinth with chamfered edges and inscriptions. On the plinth is a monolithic tapering shaft with chamfered edges and wheel head, one arm of which is missing. The cross is also a scheduled monument. | II* |
| St Michael's Church; 54.56506°N 3.46738°W | | 13th century | The church was restored in 1776, the nave was rebuilt in 1829, and the tower was added in 1904–05. The church is in stone and has a slate roof with stone coping and a cross finial. It consists of a nave, a chancel, a north chapel, and a west tower incorporating a porch and with a polygonal baptistry on the south side. The tower has three stages, stepped buttresses, a porch door with a four-centred arch, a west window with Perpendicular tracery, a stair turret to the north, a pair of bell openings, and an embattled parapet. The windows in the body of the church are lancets. The oldest part of the church is the chancel arch. | II |
| Rowrah Hall; 54.55171°N 3.46217°W | | c. 1703 | A country house that was extended in 1729. It is rendered, with a cornice, a pulvinated frieze, and a slate roof. The house has two storeys, the original part has five bays, the extension has three bays, and there are outshuts at the rear. Above the doorway is an open segmental pediment. The windows in the original part are a mix of sashes and casements in the original mullioned and transomed openings, and in the later part they are sashes. Inside the main part of the house is an inglenook and a moulded bressumer, and there is another inglenook in the rear wing. | II |
| Gate piers, Rowrah Hall; 54.55210°N 3.46204°W | — | 1739 | The gate piers are squat, in stone, and about 7 feet (2.1 m) high. Each pier has a rusticated column, a cornice, and a diagonally-set plinth that was originally surmounted by an acorn finial. | II |
| Former Stable Block to Rheda Mansion; 54.53768°N 3.50926°W | — | 1887 | The buildings are in sandstone with slate roofs, in Baronial style, and form four sides of a courtyard. The entrance range to the east includes a large arched gateway and a tower mimicking a pele tower, there is a house and accommodation in the south range, stables and other buildings in the north range, and service and storage blocks in the east range. | II |
| Lych gate and wall 54.56481°N 3.46810°W | | c. 1903 | The lych gate is at the entrance to the churchyard, and consists of a wooden superstructure on stone plinths with stone benches. It has a slate roof with a cross in front of a small gabled opening. In a niche to the left of the gate is a drinking trough with a semicircular bowl. Further to the left is a belvedere with two openings, two circular projections, and a stone bench. The wall runs along the east side of the churchyard, it is about 3 feet (0.91 m) high, castellated, and at the south end is a drum-shaped pier with a conical cap. | II |
| War memorial 54.56490°N 3.46785°W | | 1923 | The war memorial is in the churchyard of St Michael's Church. It consists of a Celtic cross about 12 feet (3.7 m) high standing on three steps. The cross is decorated with carved interlace and animals, and the names are inscribed in low relief. | II |
