= Billy Adams (footballer, born 1919) =

English footballer

Personal information
- Full name: William Henry Adams
- Date of birth: 8 January 1919
- Place of birth: Arlecdon, England
- Date of death: 1 March 1989 (aged 70)
- Place of death: Cockermouth, England
- Position: Full back

Senior career*
Years	Team	Apps	(Gls)
- Hartlepools United
1939–1946	Tottenham Hotspur	0	(0)
1946–	Carlisle United	33	(1)
- Chelmsford City
1951–	Workington	3	(0)
- * Club domestic league appearances and goals

William Henry Adams (8 January 1919 – 1 March 1989) was an English professional footballer who played for Hartlepools United, Tottenham Hotspur, Carlisle United, Chelmsford City and Workington.

== Playing career ==
Adams began his career as an amateur with Harlepools United. In January 1937 the full back signed for Tottenham Hotspur. Adams featured in one FA Cup match for the Lilywhites and played a further 10 matches during the World War II war time years. In June, 1946 he signed for his local club Carlisle United where he went on to make 33 appearances and netting a solitary goal. After a spell with Chelmsford City he ended his career at Workington.
