= Frizington =

Village in Cumbria, England

Coordinates: 54.540°N 3.495°W

- Village
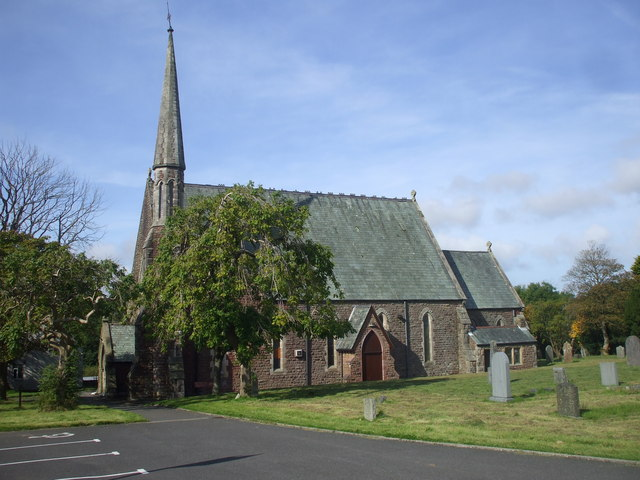
- St Paul's Church, Frizington

- Location within Cumbria
- OS grid reference: NY0316
- Civil parish: Arlecdon and Frizington
- Unitary authority: Cumberland
- Ceremonial county: Cumbria
- Region: North West
- Country: England
- Sovereign state: United Kingdom
- Post town: FRIZINGTON
- Postcode district: CA26
- Dialling code: 01946
- Police: Cumbria
- Fire: Cumbria
- Ambulance: North West
- UK Parliament: Whitehaven and Workington

Frizington is a village in the Cumberland district of Cumbria, England. It lies to the north-west of the Lake District National Park. Historically, it was a collection of farms and houses, but became a unified village as a result of the mining (both coal and iron ore) opportunities in the area. The village is known for its church, which was built in 1867–1868.

== Location ==
It lies by road five miles (eight kilometres) east of Whitehaven, 38 miles (61 kilometres) southwest of Carlisle, and 44 1/2 miles (72 kilometres) north of Barrow-in-Furness.

== Toponymy ==
"The name as a whole means 'tūn of Frisa' or 'of Frisa's people'" ('tūn' is Old English for 'homestead', 'village'; OE 'Frīsa' means 'the Frisian').

== Governance ==
Frizington forms part of the civil parish of Arlecdon and Frizington. There are two tiers of local government, at civil parish and unitary authority level: Arlecdon and Frizington Parish Council and Cumberland Council. The parish council generally meets at St Joseph's Community Hall in Frizington.

Frizington is within the Whitehaven and Workington UK Parliamentary constituency.

=== Administrative history ===
Frizington was historically one of three townships within the ancient parish of Arlecdon in the historic county of Cumberland; the other two townships were Whillimoor and Arlecdon.

In 1882, a local government district called Arlecdon and Frizington was created, covering those two townships. The Arlecdon and Frizington district was enlarged in 1894 to take in the Whillimoor township, after which the Arlecdon and Frizington district covered the whole parish of Arlecdon. Later that year, local government districts were reconstituted as urban districts under the Local Government Act 1894.

Arlecdon and Frizington Urban District was abolished in 1934. The parish of Arlecdon it had covered was renamed Arlecdon and Frizington, given a parish council, and reclassified as a rural parish within the Ennerdale Rural District. Ennerdale Rural District was abolished in 1974, becoming part of the Borough of Copeland in the new county of Cumbria. Copeland was in turn abolished in 2023 when the new Cumberland Council was created, also taking over the functions of the abolished Cumbria County Council in the area.

== Notable people ==
Stephen Holgate, a professional rugby league player with a number of clubs, came from Frizington.

== June 2010 shootings ==
On 2 June 2010, Frizington was the scene of the second murder in the killing spree known as the Cumbria shootings, when Derrick Bird shot his family solicitor, Kevin Commons.

== Transport ==
The village has one bus route operated by Stagecoach. Service 30 to either Whitehaven then Workington or to Thornhill via Egremont. The nearest railway station is Whitehaven.

== See also ==
- Listed buildings in Arlecdon and Frizington
