= Asby, Cumberland =

Village in Cumbria, England

Coordinates: 54.570°N 3.452°W

Asby
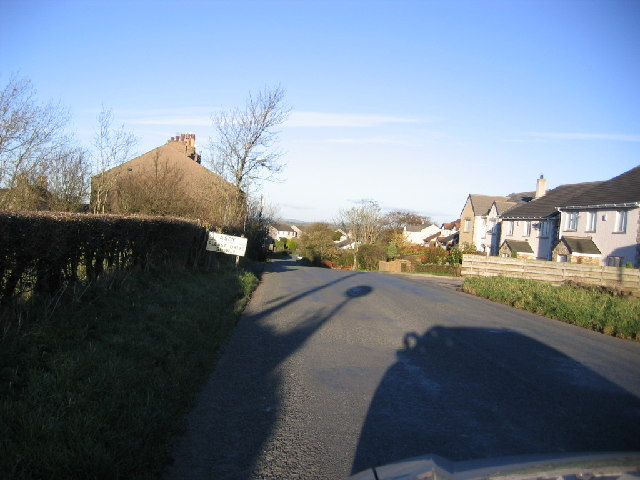
- Asby

- Location in former Copeland Borough Location within Cumbria
- OS grid reference: NY0620
- Civil parish: Arlecdon and Frizington
- Unitary authority: Cumberland
- Ceremonial county: Cumbria
- Region: North West
- Country: England
- Sovereign state: United Kingdom
- Post town: FRIZINGTON
- Postcode district: CA26
- Dialling code: 01946
- Police: Cumbria
- Fire: Cumbria
- Ambulance: North West
- UK Parliament: Whitehaven and Workington

Asby is a village in Cumberland, Cumbria, England, near the Lake District National Park.

== Location ==
It lies by road 7.5 miles (12 km) east of Whitehaven, 35.1 miles (56 km) south-west of Carlisle and 47.4 miles (76 km) to the north of Barrow-in-Furness.

== Governance ==
Asby is within the Whitehaven and Workington UK Parliamentary constituency

Asby has its own Parish Council; Arlecdon & Frizington Parish Council, the civil parish of Arlecdon and Frizington, has a population of 3,678,
