= Ennerdale Rural District =

Former local government area in the UK

Coordinates: 54.5°N 3.4°W

Ennerdale was a rural district in the county of Cumberland in England from 1934 to 1974.

It was created in 1934 by a County Review Order, by the merger of the urban districts of Arlecdon and Frizington, Cleator Moor, Egremont, and Harrington along with part of Bootle Rural District and most of Whitehaven Rural District. The district was named after Ennerdale. The council's offices were at "The Flosh", a converted nineteenth century house on Main Street, Cleator.

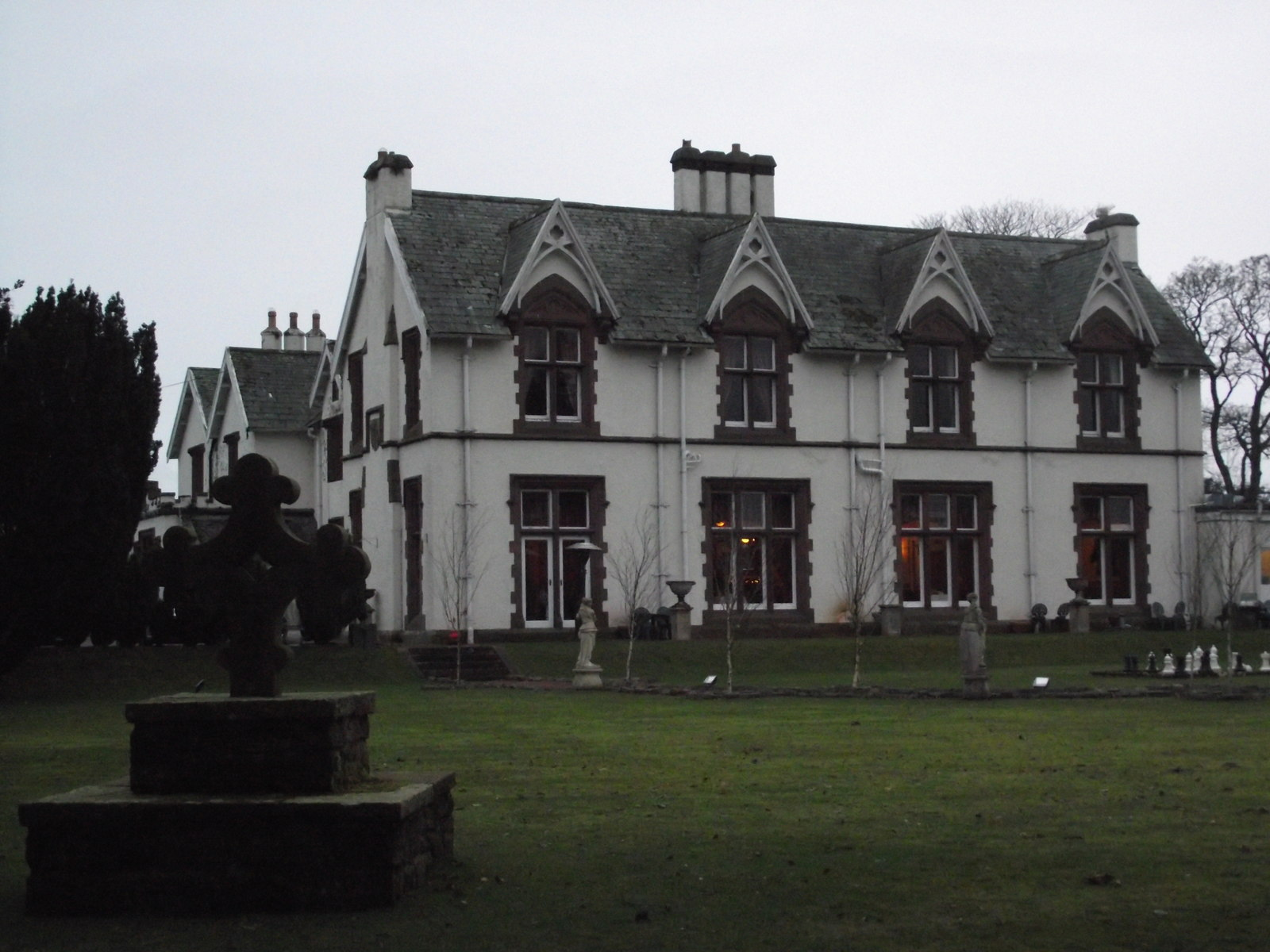
Former council offices: The Flosh, Main Street, Cleator.

It survived until 1974 when under the Local Government Act 1972 it was merged with other districts and the Borough of Whitehaven to form the Copeland district in Cumbria.

In the neighbouring county of Westmorland a similar type of area and in fact containing fewer towns and villages namely Lakes was created at the same time as an urban district.
