= Keekle Colliers' Platform railway station =

Disused railway station in Cumbria, England

Keekle Colliers' Platform

General information
- Location: Keekle Terrace, near Cleator Moor, Cumberland; England
- Coordinates: 54.5331°N 3.5406°W
- Grid reference: NY004164
- Platforms: 2

Other information
- Status: Disused

History
- Original company: Cleator and Workington Junction Railway
- Post-grouping: London, Midland and Scottish Railway

Key dates
- July 1910: Opened to workmen's trains
- 2 January 1911: Closed
- June 1913: Reopened
- 1 October 1923: Closed
Location

Keekle Colliers' Platform railway station was opened by the Cleator and Workington Junction Railway (C&WJR) in July 1910, closed the following January, reopened in June 1913 then closed for good on 1 October 1923. The halt was provided to enable residents of the isolated Keekle Terrace, less than 100 yds from the track, to get to and from work at the equally isolated Walkmill Colliery and coke ovens in Cumbria, England. The Platform is not shown by Jowett.

The halt consisted of two wooden platforms. It was unstaffed and had no shelter or toilet, but each platform carried a lone oil lamp. Publications both official and authoritative variously refer to the halt as Keekle Colliers' Platform, Keekle Colliers Platform and Keekle Halt.

The halt did not appear in public timetables. Its purpose was to bring workers to and from the remote colliery, but on at least one occasion a passenger special called to take children to and from a Sunday School outing at St Bees. Further research is needed to establish exactly when services to the halt ended, as Butt differs from Croughton et al., who state it was still being used in October 1923.

== History ==
The line was one of the fruits of the rapid industrialisation of West Cumberland in the second half of the nineteenth century, being specifically born as a reaction to oligopolistic behaviour by the London and North Western and Whitehaven, Cleator and Egremont Railways. The halt was on the company's main line from Moor Row to Workington Central.

All lines in the area were primarily aimed at mineral traffic, notably iron ore, coal and limestone, none more so than the C&WJR's line to Workington, which earned the local name "The Track of the Ironmasters". General goods and passenger services were provided, but were very small beer compared with mineral traffic.

The founding Act of Parliament of June 1878 confirmed the company's agreement with the Furness Railway that the latter would operate the line for one third of the receipts.

== Services ==
Passenger trains consisted of antiquated Furness stock hauled largely by elderly Furness engines referred to as "rolling ruins" by one author after a footplate ride in 1949.

No Sunday passenger service was ever provided on the line.

The initial passenger service in 1879 consisted of

- two Up (northbound) trains a day, leaving Moor Row at 09:20 and 13:45, calling at Cleator Moor, Moresby Parks, Distington, High Harrington and terminating at Workington, taking 30 minutes in all.
- they returned as Down trains, leaving Workington at 10:30 and 16:00

In 1880 the extension northwards to Siddick Junction was opened. The service was extended to run to and from Siddick and an extra train was added, with

- three up trains a day, leaving Moor Row at 07:40, 10:12 and 14:45, taking 30 minutes to Workington and an extra four to proceed to Siddick, where connections were made with the MCR.
- Down trains left Siddick at 08:45, 12:22 and 17:00

By 1922 the service reached its high water mark, with:

- five up trains a day from Moor Row through to Siddick, leaving Moor Row at 07:20, 09:50, 13:15, 16:50 and 1820.
- one train Mondays to Fridays Only from Moor Row to Workington, leaving at 13:45 and also calling at Moresby Junction Halt, making that halt qualify as a publicly advertised passenger station
- one Saturdays Only train leaving Cleator Moor (NB not from Moor Row) at 12:50 for Workington
- one Saturdays Only train leaving Moor Row at 19:35 for Workington

There was one fewer Down train, as the 09:50 Up was provided to give a connection at Siddick with a fast MCR train to Carlisle with connections beyond.

Although not serving Keekle, two Saturdays Only trains left Oatlands at 16:05 and 21:35 for Workington, calling at Distington and High Harrington, with balancing workings leaving Workington at 15:30 and 21:00.

There were also trains using the Lowca Light Railway plying between Lowca and Workington, but they served no "pure" C&WJR stations other than Workington Central.

As with advertised passenger trains, in 1920 workmen's trains ran on the company's three southern routes:

- between Workington Central and Lowca using the Lowca Light Railway
- between Arlecdon (Rowrah's "other station") and Oatlands on the single track "Baird's Line", and
- on the "main line" between Siddick Junction and Moor Row
  - from Siddick Junction to Moor Row, calling at all passenger stations except Moresby Parks, calling at Moresby Junction Halt instead
  - from Moor Row to Moresby Junction Halt, calling at Cleator Moor and Keekle Colliers' Platform.

The situation in 1922 was similar.

The 1920 Working Time Table shows relatively few Goods trains, none of which called at Keekle.

Mineral traffic was an altogether different matter, dwarfing all other traffic in volume, receipts and profits. The key source summarises it "...the 'Track of the Ironmasters' ran like a main traffic artery through an area honeycombed with mines, quarries and ironworks." The associated drama was all the greater because all the company's lines abounded with steep inclines and sharp curves, frequently requiring banking. The saving grace was that south of Workington at least, most gradients favoured loaded trains. During the First World War especially, the company ran "Double Trains", akin to North American practice, with two mineral trains coupled together and a banking engine behind, i.e. locomotive-wagons-guards van-locomotive-wagons-guards van-banker. Such trains worked regularly between Distington and Cleator Moor West, passing the halt as they did so, full tilt up the 1 in 70 northbound. The practice was discontinued after dark from 1 April 1918.

The workings at Keekle Colliers' Platform exemplified the line's role, enabling coke and coal to be won and carried from a remote site to industries near and far.

Like any business tied to one or few industries, the railway was at the mercy of trade fluctuations and technological change. The Cumberland iron industry led the charge in the nineteenth century, but became less and less competitive as time passed and local ore became worked out and harder to win, taking the fortunes of the railway with it. The peak year was 1909, when 1,644,514 tons of freight were handled. Ominously for the line, that tonnage was down to just over 800,000 by 1922, bringing receipts of £83,349, compared with passenger fares totalling £6,570.

== Rundown and closure ==
The high water mark for the line's tonnage was 1909, the high water mark for progress was 1913, with the opening of the Harrington and Lowca line for passenger traffic. A chronology of the line's affairs from 1876 to 1992 has almost no entries before 1914 which fail to include "opened" or "commenced". After 1918 the position was reversed, when the litany of step-by-step closures and withdrawals was relieved only by a control cabin and a signalbox being erected in 1919 and the Admiralty saving the northern extension in 1937 by establishing an armaments depot at Broughton.

The halt probably closed in 1923. The line past the site of the platform closed in 1963 and was subsequently lifted.

== Afterlife ==
By 2013 Keekle Terrace and the trackbed through the Platform were readily visible on satellite imagery, especially the striking Keekle Viaduct a short distance to the south.

Preceding station	Disused railways	Following station
Moresby Junction Halt; Line and station closed	Cleator and Workington Junction Railway	Cleator Moor West; Line and station closed

== See also ==
- Maryport and Carlisle Railway
- Furness Railway
- Whitehaven, Cleator and Egremont Railway
- Cockermouth and Workington Railway
