= Millgrove railway station (England) =

Disused railway station in Cumbria, England

Millgrove

General information
- Location: Moresby, Cumberland; England
- Coordinates: 54.5712°N 3.5518°W
- Grid reference: NX997206
- Platforms: 2

Other information
- Status: Disused

History
- Original company: Cleator and Workington Junction Railway

Key dates
- by 23 July 1903: Opened
- by 1921: Closed
- 16 September 1963.: Line through the station site closed
Location

Millgrove railway station was a private station on the Cleator and Workington Junction Railway (C&WJR) main line from Moor Row to Workington Central. It appears to have served the Burnyeat family who lived at a house named Millgrove in Moresby, Cumbria, England, which was near the company's main line. William Burnyeat (1849–1921) was on the company's board of directors from 1900 to 1921.

The grid reference, latitude and longitude shown are interpreted from a large scale map showing the station.

The station is said to have been in use during the First World War.

== Uncertainties ==
The station is referred to by McGowan Gradon and Robinson, but standard works, notably Butt, Croughton and Jowett, make no mention of the station; nor do regional works, notably Anderson, Marshall, and Suggitt. It is not mentioned in the company's May 1920 Working Time Table. Contemporary 6" OS Maps do not show the station or anything which suggests the remains of a station, though a minor road passes Millgrove and crosses the line nearby.

Nevertheless, the minutes of the C&WJR Board Meeting of 23 July 1903 refer to erecting an Up platform at Millgrove and extending the down platform.

== History of the line ==
The line was one of the fruits of the rapid industrialisation of West Cumberland in the second half of the nineteenth century, being specifically born as a reaction to oligopolistic behaviour by the London and North Western and Whitehaven, Cleator and Egremont Railways. The station was on the line from Moor Row to Workington Central. The line opened to passengers on 1 October 1879.

All lines in the area were primarily aimed at mineral traffic, notably iron ore, coal and limestone, none more so than the new line to Workington, which earned the local name "The Track of the Ironmasters". General goods and passenger services were provided, but were very small beer compared with mineral traffic.

The founding Act of Parliament of June 1878 confirmed the company's agreement with the Furness Railway that the latter would operate the line for one third of the receipts.

Like any business tied to one or few industries, the railway was at the mercy of trade fluctuations and technological change. The Cumberland iron industry led the charge in the nineteenth century, but became less and less competitive as time passed and local ore became worked out and harder to win, taking the fortunes of the railway with it. The peak year was 1909, when 1,644,514 tons of freight were handled. Ominously for the line, that tonnage was down to just over 800,000 by 1922, bringing receipts of £83,349, compared with passenger fares totalling £6,570.

== Rundown and closure ==
The peak year for tonnage was 1909, and for progress was 1913, with the opening of the Harrington and Lowca line for passenger traffic. A chronology of the line's affairs from 1876 to 1992 has almost no entries before 1914 which fail to include "opened" or "commenced". After 1918 the position was reversed, when the litany of step-by-step closures and withdrawals was relieved only by a control cabin and a signalbox being erected in 1919 and the Admiralty saving the northern extension in 1937 by establishing an armaments depot at Broughton.

Millgrove station had closed by 1921 Normal passenger traffic ended along the line in 1931. Diversions and specials, for example to football matches, made use of the line, but it was not easy to use as a through north–south route because all such trains would have to reverse at Moor Row or Corkickle.

An enthusiasts' special ran through on 6 September 1954, the only one to do so using main line passenger stock. The next such train to traverse any C&WJR metals did so in 1966 at the north end of the line, three years after the line through Moresby Parks closed.

== Afterlife ==
By 2013 aerial images clearly show the line of route and that the area to the west of the station site had been transformed by housing.

Preceding station	Disused railways	Following station
Distington; Line and station closed	Cleator and Workington Junction Railway	Moresby Parks; Line and station closed

== See also ==
- Maryport and Carlisle Railway
- Furness Railway
- Whitehaven, Cleator and Egremont Railway
- Cockermouth and Workington Railway
