= High Harrington railway station =

Disused railway station in Cumbria, England

High Harrington
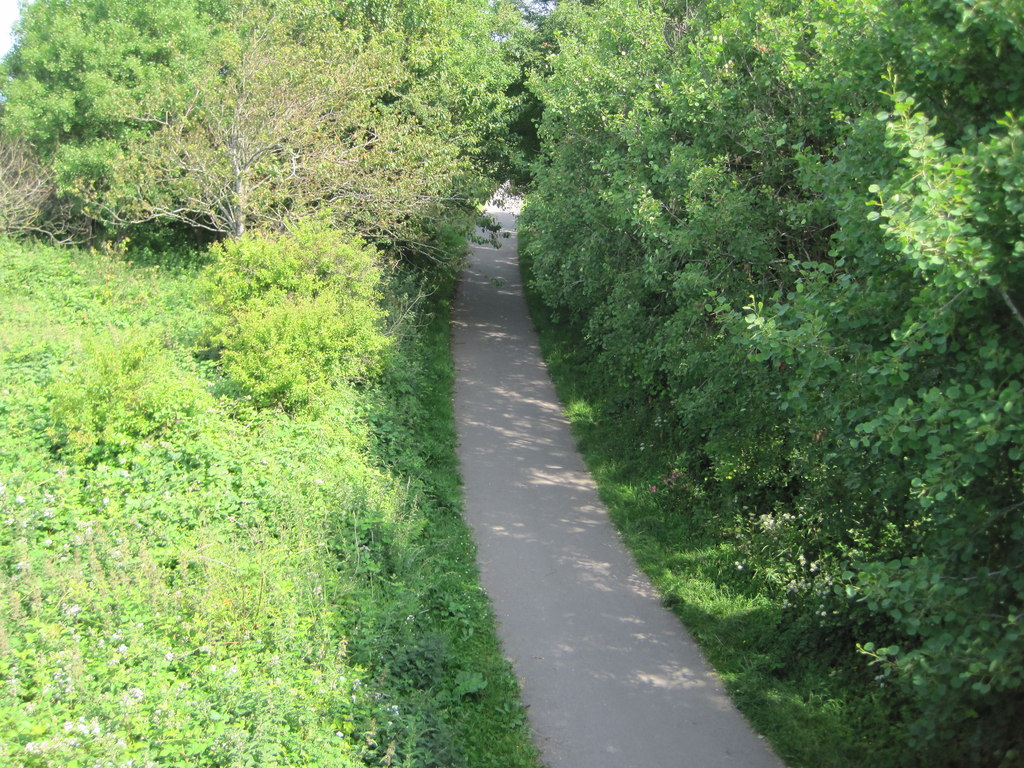
- The site of the station in 2013

General information
- Location: Harrington, Cumberland; England
- Coordinates: 54.6149°N 3.5508°W
- Grid reference: NX999255
- Platforms: 2

Other information
- Status: Disused

History
- Original company: Cleator and Workington Junction Railway
- Post-grouping: London, Midland and Scottish Railway

Key dates
- 1 October 1879: Opened
- 13 April 1931: Closed
- 1 July 1963: Closed completely
- 16 September 1963: Line through the station closed
Location

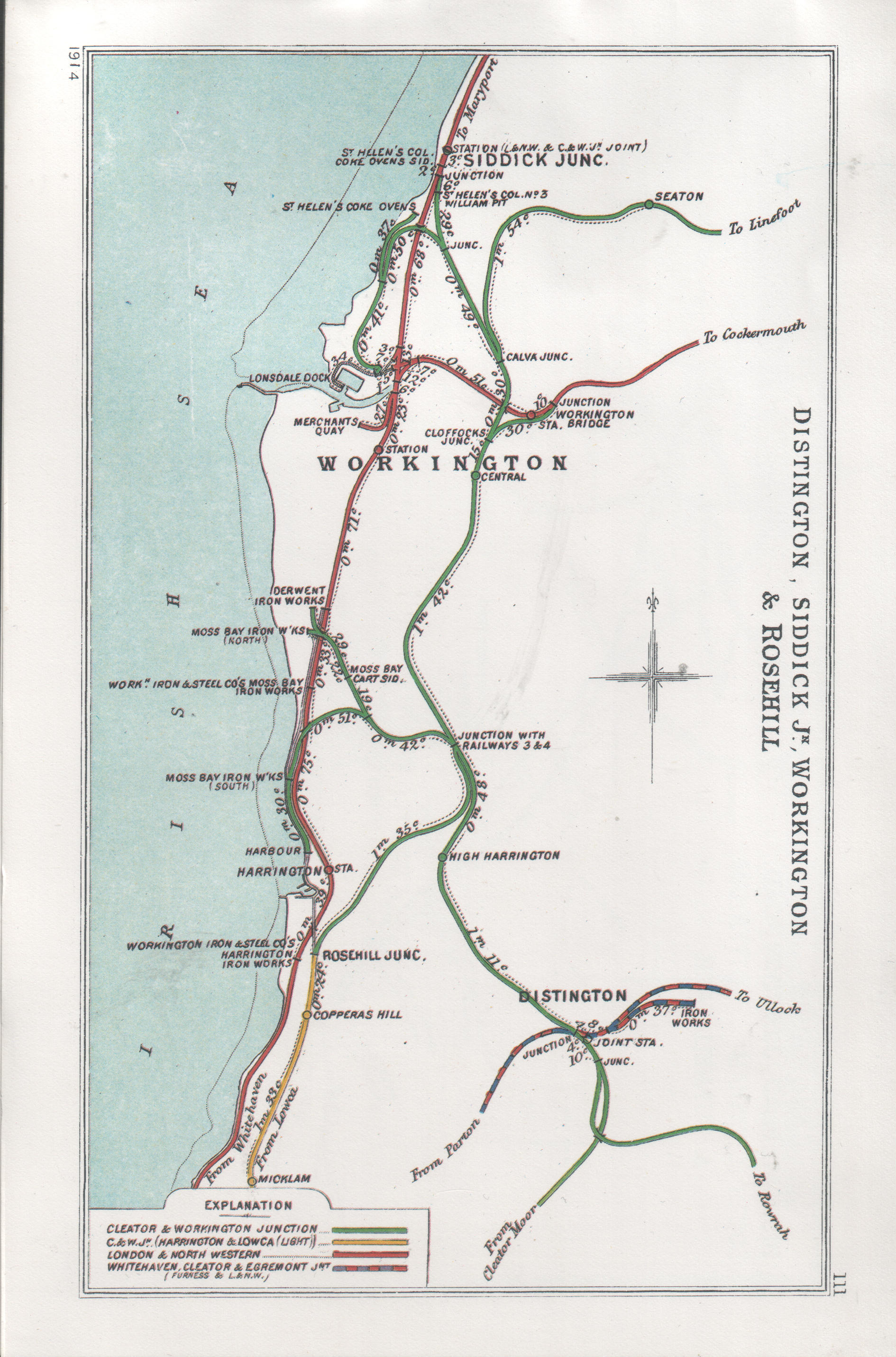
A 1914 Railway Clearing House Junction Diagram showing the complex network which existed in the Workington area

High Harrington railway station was opened by the Cleator and Workington Junction Railway (C&WJR) in 1879. It was situated half a mile south of Harrington Junction on the company's main line. and served what was then the eastern extremity of Harrington in Cumbria, England. The station is not to be confused with the current Harrington station a kilometre away on the coastal line.

== History ==
The line was one of the fruits of the rapid industrialisation of West Cumberland in the second half of the nineteenth century, specifically being born as a reaction to oligopolistic behaviour by the London and North Western and Whitehaven, Cleator and Egremont Railways. The station was on the line from Moor Row to Workington Central. Both line and station opened to passengers on 1 October 1879.

All lines in the area were primarily aimed at mineral traffic, notably iron ore, coal and limestone, none more so than the new line to Workington, which earned the local name "The Track of the Ironmasters". General goods and passenger services were provided, but were very small beer compared with mineral traffic.

The founding Act of Parliament of June 1878 confirmed the company's agreement with the Furness Railway that the latter would operate the line for one third of the receipts.

== Services ==
Passenger trains consisted of antiquated Furness stock hauled largely by elderly Furness engines referred to as "rolling ruins" by one author after a footplate ride in 1949.

No Sunday passenger service was ever provided on the line.

The initial passenger service in 1879 consisted of

- two Up (northbound) trains a day, leaving Moor Row at 09:20 and 13:45, calling at Cleator Moor, Moresby Parks, Distington, High Harrington and terminating at Workington, taking 30 minutes in all.
- they returned as Down trains, leaving Workington at 10:30 and 16:00

In 1880 the extension northwards to Siddick Junction was opened. The service was extended to run to and from Siddick and an extra train was added, with

- three up trains a day, leaving Moor Row at 07:40, 10:12 and 14:45, taking 30 minutes to Workington and an extra four to proceed to Siddick, where connections were made with the MCR.
- Down trains left Siddick at 08:45, 12:22 and 17:00

By 1922 the service reached its high water mark, with:

- five up trains a day from Moor Row through to Siddick, leaving Moor Row at 07:20, 09:50, 13:15, 16:50 and 1820.
- one train Mondays to Fridays Only from Moor Row to Workington, leaving at 13:45 and also calling at Moresby Junction Halt, making that halt qualify as a publicly advertised passenger station
- one Saturdays Only train leaving Cleator Moor (NB not from Moor Row) at 12:50 for Workington
- one Saturdays Only train leaving Moor Row at 19:35 for Workington

There was one fewer Down train, as the 09:50 Up was provided to give a connection at Siddick with a fast MCR train to Carlisle with connections beyond.

Two Saturdays Only trains left Oatlands at 16:05 and 21:35 for Workington, calling at Distington and High Harrington, with balancing workings leaving Workington at 15:30 and 21:00.

There were also trains using the Lowca Light Railway plying between Lowca and Workington; they turned off the main line at Harrington Junction and therefore served no "pure" C&WJR stations other than Workington Central.

As with advertised passenger trains, in 1920 workmen's trains ran on the company's three southern routes:

- between Workington Central and Lowca using the Lowca Light Railway
- between Arlecdon (Rowrah's "other station") and Oatlands on the single track "Baird's Line", and
- on the "main line" between Siddick Junction and Moor Row
  - from Siddick Junction to Moor Row, calling at all passenger stations except Moresby Parks, calling at Moresby Junction Halt instead
  - from Moor Row to Moresby Junction Halt, calling at Cleator Moor and Keekle Colliers' Platform

The situation in 1922 was similar.

The 1920 Working Time Table shows relatively few Goods trains, with just one a day in each direction booked to call at High Harrington.

Mineral traffic was an altogether different matter, dwarfing all other traffic in volume, receipts and profits. The key source summarises it "...the 'Track of the Ironmasters' ran like a main traffic artery through an area honeycombed with mines, quarries and ironworks." The associated drama was all the greater because all the company's lines abounded with steep inclines and sharp curves, frequently requiring banking. The saving grace was that south of Workington at least, most gradients favoured loaded trains. During the First World War especially, the company ran "Double Trains", akin to North American practice, with two mineral trains coupled together and a banking engine behind, i.e. locomotive-wagons-guards van-locomotive-wagons-guards van-banker. Such trains worked regularly between Distington and Cleator Moor West. The practice was discontinued after dark from 1 April 1918.

Most stations on the company's lines had heavy industrial neighbours, such as ironworks next to Cleator Moor West, or served primarily industrial workforces, such as Keekle Colliers' Platform. Throughout its working life High Harrington was more isolated, with heavy industry visible but not next to the station. By 2013 the station site was flanked substantial housing estates.

Like any business tied to one or few industries, the railway was at the mercy of trade fluctuations and technological change. The Cumberland iron industry led the charge in the nineteenth century, but became less and less competitive as time passed and local ore became worked out and harder to win, taking the fortunes of the railway with it. The peak year was 1909, when 1,644,514 tons of freight were handled. Ominously for the line, that tonnage was down to just over 800,000 by 1922, bringing receipts of £83,349, compared with passenger fares totalling £6,570.

== Rundown and closure ==
The high water mark for tonnage was 1909, the high water mark for progress was 1913, with the opening of the Harrington and Lowca line for passenger traffic. A chronology of the line's affairs from 1876 to 1992 has almost no entries before 1914 which fail to include "opened" or "commenced". After 1918 the position was reversed, when the litany of step-by-step closures and withdrawals was relieved only by a control cabin and a signalbox being erected in 1919 and the Admiralty saving the northern extension in 1937 by establishing an armaments depot at Broughton.

High Harrington station closed on 13 April 1931 when normal passenger traffic ended along the line. Diversions and specials, for example to football matches, made use of the line, but it was not easy to use as a through north–south route because all such trains would have to reverse at Moor Row or Corkickle.

An enthusiasts' special ran through on 6 September 1954, the only one to do so using main line passenger stock. The next such train to traverse any C&WJR metals did so in 1966 at the north end of the line, three years after the line through High Harrington closed.

== Afterlife ==
By 2013 aerial images clearly show the line of route and that the area around the station site had been transformed by housing. The trackbed through the station site was used by the West Cumbria Cycle Network.

Preceding station	Disused railways	Following station
Workington Central; Line and station closed	Cleator and Workington Junction Railway	Distington; Line and station closed

== See also ==
- Maryport and Carlisle Railway
- Furness Railway
- Whitehaven, Cleator and Egremont Railway
- Cockermouth and Workington Railway
