= Distington railway station =

Disused railway station in Cumbria, England

Distington
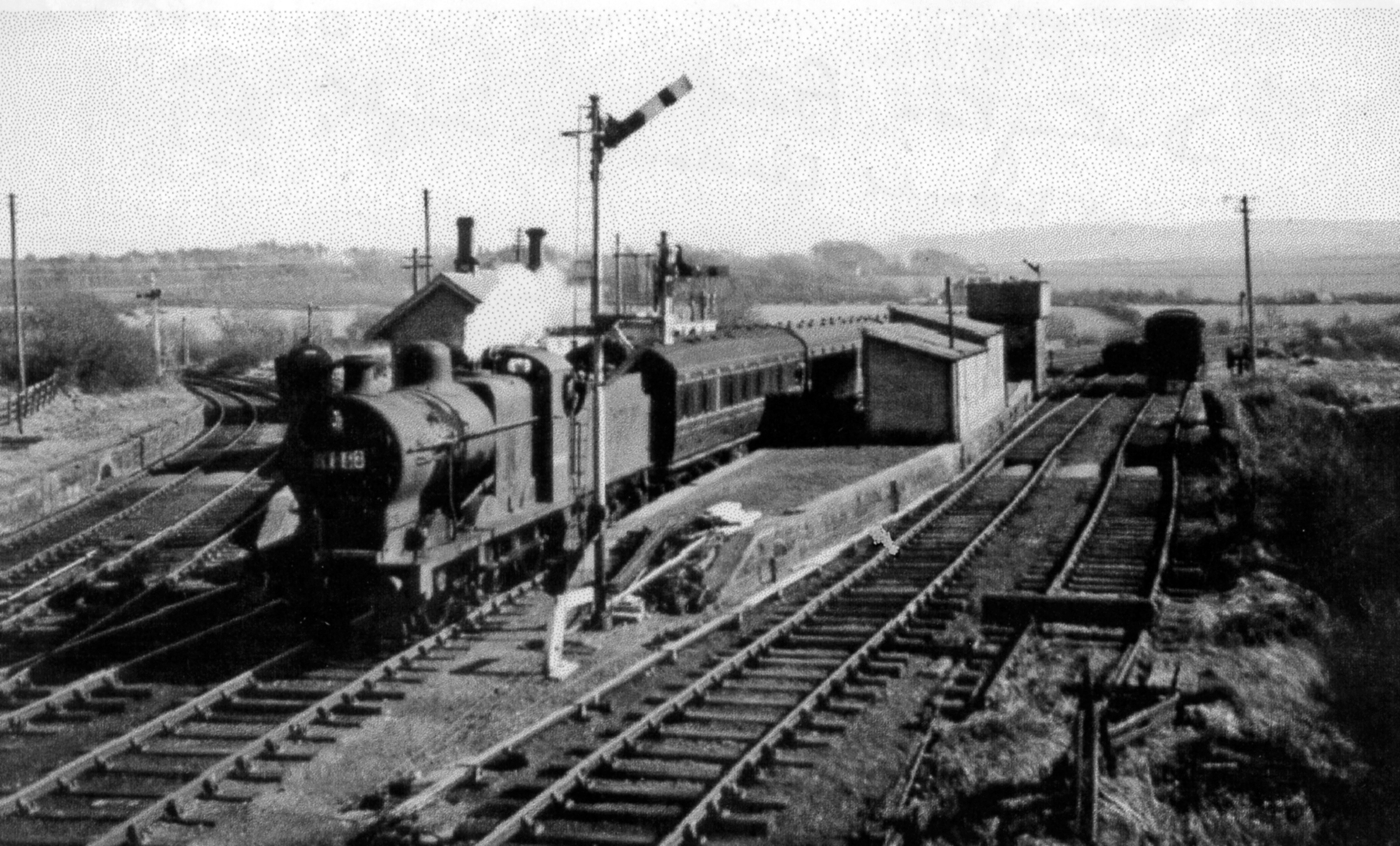
- Distington station, with train 1951

General information
- Location: Distington, Cumberland; England
- Coordinates: 54.6019°N 3.5336°W
- Grid reference: NY102400
- Platforms: 4 (Note: Photographs such as that at the head of this article appear to show five platform faces. The "face" nearest the camera was never a platform, as evidenced by the building built up to its edge. A better financed railway would have put a fence along this edge.)

Other information
- Status: Disused

History
- Original company: Cleator and Workington Junction Railway and LNWR & FR Joint Railway, staffed by CWJR
- Post-grouping: London, Midland and Scottish Railway

Key dates
- 1 October 1879: Opened
- 13 April 1931: Closed
- 1 July 1963: Closed completely
- 16 September 1963: Line through the station closed
Location

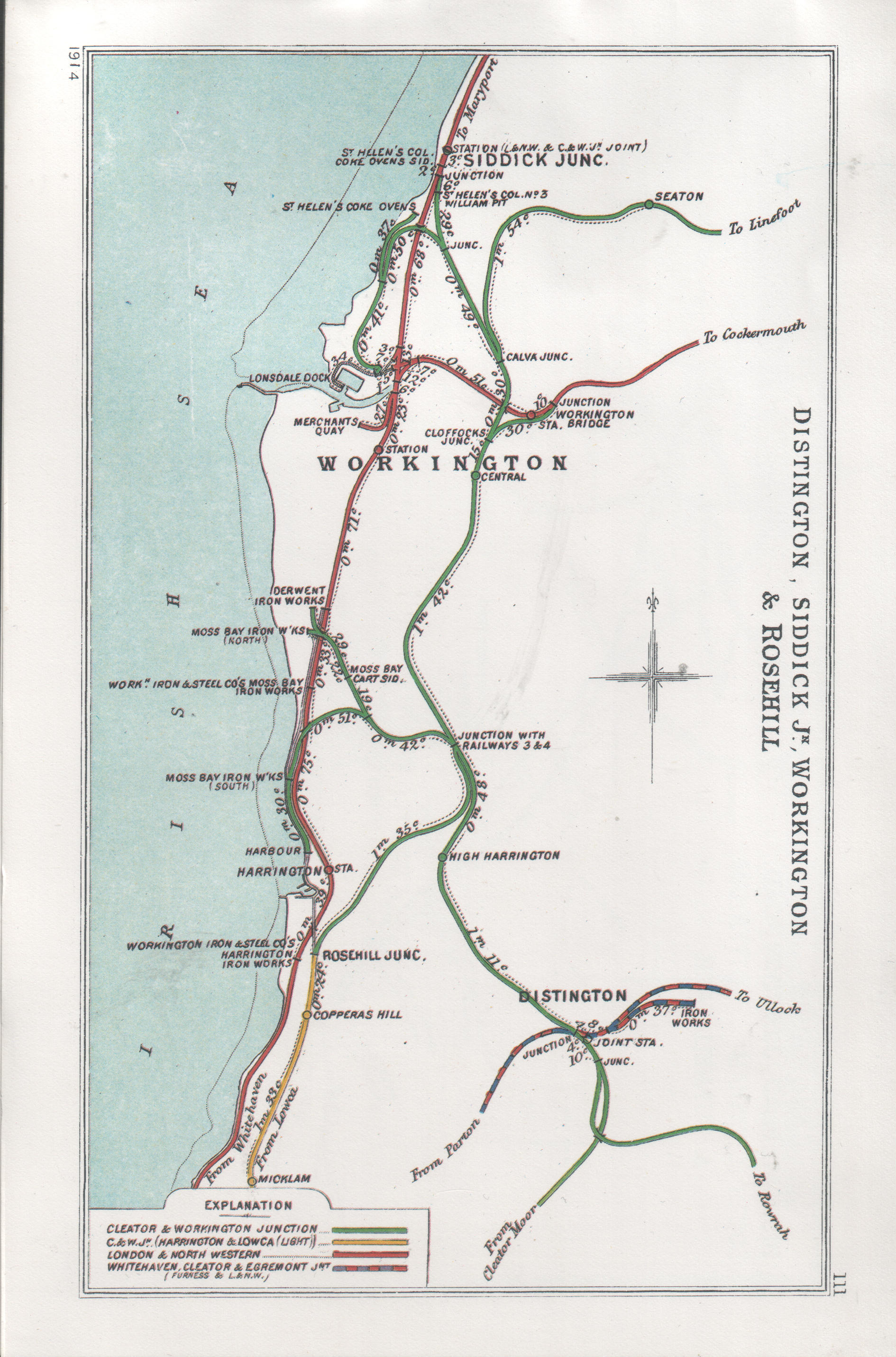
A 1914 Railway Clearing House Junction Diagram showing the complex network which existed in the Workington area

Distington railway station was opened jointly by the Cleator and Workington Junction Railway (C&WJR) and the LNWR and Furness Joint Railway (The Joint Line) on 1 October 1879. It was situated on the northern edge of the village of Distington, Cumbria, England, where the C&WJR's north–south main line crossed the Joint Line's east–west Gilgarran Branch.

== History ==
The C&WJR line was one of the fruits of the rapid industrialisation of West Cumberland in the second half of the nineteenth century, specifically being born as a reaction to oligopolistic behaviour by the London and North Western and Whitehaven, Cleator and Egremont Railways. The Gilgarran Branch was in large part a countermeasure to the C&WJR "interloper."

All lines in the area were primarily aimed at mineral traffic, notably iron ore, coal and limestone, none more so than the C&WJR's new line to Workington, which earned the local name "The Track of the Ironmasters". General goods and passenger services were provided, but were very small when compared with mineral traffic. The Gilgarran Branch never had any pretensions to being a passenger line, though services were sometimes provided on the western section, as shown below.

The W&CJR's founding Act of Parliament of June 1878 confirmed the company's agreement with the Furness Railway that the latter would operate the line for one third of the receipts. The Gilgarran Branch was mainly operated using LNWR locomotives.

== Services ==
C&WJR passenger trains consisted of antiquated Furness stock hauled largely by elderly Furness engines referred to as "rolling ruins" by one author after a footplate ride in 1949.

No Sunday passenger service was ever provided on either line.

The initial passenger service in 1879 consisted of

- two Up (northbound) trains a day, leaving Moor Row at 09:20 and 13:45, calling at Cleator Moor, Moresby Parks, Distington, High Harrington and terminating at Workington, taking 30 minutes in all.
- they returned as Down trains, leaving Workington at 10:30 and 16:00

In 1880 the extension northwards to Siddick Junction was opened. The service was extended to run to and from Siddick and an extra train was added, with

- three up trains a day, leaving Moor Row at 07:40, 10:12 and 14:45, taking 30 minutes to Workington and an extra four to proceed to Siddick, where connections were made with the MCR.
- Down trains left Siddick at 08:45, 12:22 and 17:00

From 1 June 1881 the WC&ER provided a passenger service from Distington to Whitehaven via Parton, using the western section of the Gilgarran Branch. The fares received were less than £10 per annum, so the service was withdrawn after operating on 8 December 1883. From autumn 1913 the service was given another try; sources disagree about the start date, citing the beginning of either October or November (a working timetable for February 1913 included the service but that may have been premature). The service ran only on Thursdays (one round trip) and Saturdays (two round trips), and was withdrawn after Saturday 29 August 1914 amongst service withdrawals upon the outbreak of war. This service has been explained as being for workers from Distington to expanding collieries and coke ovens around Lowca, but the service pattern gainsays this (perhaps arising from confusion with a service which started in January 1915 between Whitehaven and the halt at Parton, mentioned below). No passenger service ever ran on the eastern section between Distington and Ullock.

By 1922 the service reached its high water mark, with:

- five up trains a day from Moor Row through to Siddick, leaving Moor Row at 07:20, 09:50, 13:15, 16:50 and 1820.
- one train Mondays to Fridays Only from Moor Row to Workington, leaving at 13:45 and also calling at Moresby Junction Halt, making that halt qualify as a publicly advertised passenger station
- one Saturdays Only train leaving Cleator Moor (NB not from Moor Row) at 12:50 for Workington
- one Saturdays Only train leaving Moor Row at 19:35 for Workington

There was one fewer Down train, as the 09:50 Up was provided to give a connection at Siddick with a fast MCR train to Carlisle with connections beyond.

Two Saturdays Only trains left Oatlands at 16:05 and 21:35 for Workington, calling at Distington and High Harrington, with balancing workings leaving Workington at 15:30 and 21:00.

There were also trains using the Lowca Light Railway plying between Lowca and Workington; they turned off the main line at Harrington Junction, north of Distington, and therefore served no "pure" C&WJR stations other than Workington Central.

As with advertised passenger trains, in 1920 workmen's trains ran on the company's three southern routes:

- between Workington Central and Lowca using the Lowca Light Railway
- between Arlecdon (Rowrah's "other station") and Oatlands on the single track "Baird's Line", and
- on the "main line" between Siddick Junction and Moor Row
  - from Siddick Junction to Moor Row, calling at all passenger stations except Moresby Parks, calling at Moresby Junction Halt instead
  - from Moor Row to Moresby Junction Halt, calling at Cleator Moor and Keekle Colliers' Platform

The situation in 1922 was similar.

In January 1898 the company agreed with the Postmaster General to carry a mail bag daily between Workington and Siddick and between Workington and Distington. It is likely that this was conveyed on passenger trains. At some point thereafter the service was extended to Rowrah. The "Mail Train" beyond Distington to Oatlands and Arlecdon usually consisted of a C&WJR 0-6-0ST and a guards van.

The 1920 Working Time Table shows relatively few Goods trains, with just one a day in each direction booked to call at High Harrington.

Mineral traffic was an altogether different matter, dwarfing all other traffic in volume, receipts and profits. The key source summarises it "...the 'Track of the Ironmasters' ran like a main traffic artery through an area honeycombed with mines, quarries and ironworks." The associated drama was all the greater because all the company's lines abounded with steep inclines and sharp curves, frequently requiring banking. The saving grace was that south of Workington at least, most gradients favoured loaded trains. During the First World War especially, the company ran "Double Trains", akin to North American practice, with two mineral trains coupled together and a banking engine behind, i.e. locomotive-wagons-guards van-locomotive-wagons-guards van-banker. Such trains worked regularly between Distington and Cleator Moor West. The practice was discontinued after dark from 1 April 1918.

Most stations on the C&WJR's lines had heavy industrial neighbours, such as ironworks next to Cleator Moor West, or served primarily industrial workforces, such as Keekle Colliers' Platform. Distington was also an Iron Town, with an iron works established next to the Gilgarron branch a short distance east of the station in the Summer of 1879 and Whythemoor Colliery a short distance beyond that.

Like any business tied to one or few industries, the railway was at the mercy of trade fluctuations and technological change. The Cumberland iron industry led the charge in the nineteenth century, but became less and less competitive as time passed and local ore became worked out and harder to win, taking the fortunes of the railway with it. The peak year was 1909, when 1,644,514 tons of freight were handled. Ominously for the line, that tonnage was down to just over 800,000 by 1922, bringing receipts of £83,349, compared with passenger fares totalling £6,570.

== Rundown and closure ==
The Gilgarran Branch east of Distington was moribund within ten years of opening, with only one out-and-back working from Ullock per day, Monday to Saturday. Distington Ironworks closed in 1922. The western, Parton to Distington, section had just one through train a day, with a second going part way along the line from the Parton end, to a colliery. A workmen's service to Parton Halt at the western end of the branch, which never reached Distington, started on 11 January 1915 and ended in 1929.

The high water mark for tonnage along the C&WJR was 1909, the high water mark for progress was 1913, with the opening of the Harrington and Lowca line for passenger traffic. A chronology of the line's affairs from 1876 to 1992 has almost no entries before 1914 which fail to include "opened" or "commenced". After 1918 the position was reversed, when the litany of step-by-step closures and withdrawals was relieved only by a control cabin and a signalbox being erected in 1919 and the Admiralty saving the northern extension in 1937 by establishing an armaments depot at Broughton.

Distington station and small engine shed closed on 13 April 1931 when normal passenger traffic ended along the line. Diversions and specials, for example to football matches, made use of the line, but it was not easy to use as a through north–south route because all such trains would have to reverse at Moor Row or Corkickle.

An enthusiasts' special called on 6 September 1954, the only one to do so using main line passenger stock. The next such train to traverse any C&WJR metals did so in 1966 at the north end of the line, three years after the line through Distington closed.

== Afterlife ==
By 2013 the village had grown and the ironworks site was a substantial industrial estate.

By 2013 aerial images clearly show the lines of route through the station site. The general line of the C&WJR trackbed through the station site was used by the West Cumbria Cycle Network. The general line of the Gilgarran Branch west of the station site was used by the A595, whereas its general line to Ullock Junction was fragmented; some was clear, some had been reused as minor or service roads and others had been returned to farmland.

Preceding station	Disused railways	Following station
High Harrington; Line and station closed	Cleator and Workington Junction Railway	Millgrove; Line and station closed
High Harrington; Line and station closed	Cleator and Workington Junction Railway	Oatlands; Line and station closed
Parton Halt; Line and station closed	LNWR & FR Joint Railway; Gilgarran Branch	Terminus

== See also ==
- Maryport and Carlisle Railway
- Furness Railway
- Whitehaven, Cleator and Egremont Railway
- Cockermouth and Workington Railway
