= Millgrove railway station =

Millgrove railway station may refer to:

- Millgrove railway station (England)
- Millgrove railway station, Melbourne
