= Workington Central railway station =

Disused railway station in Cumbria, England

Workington Central
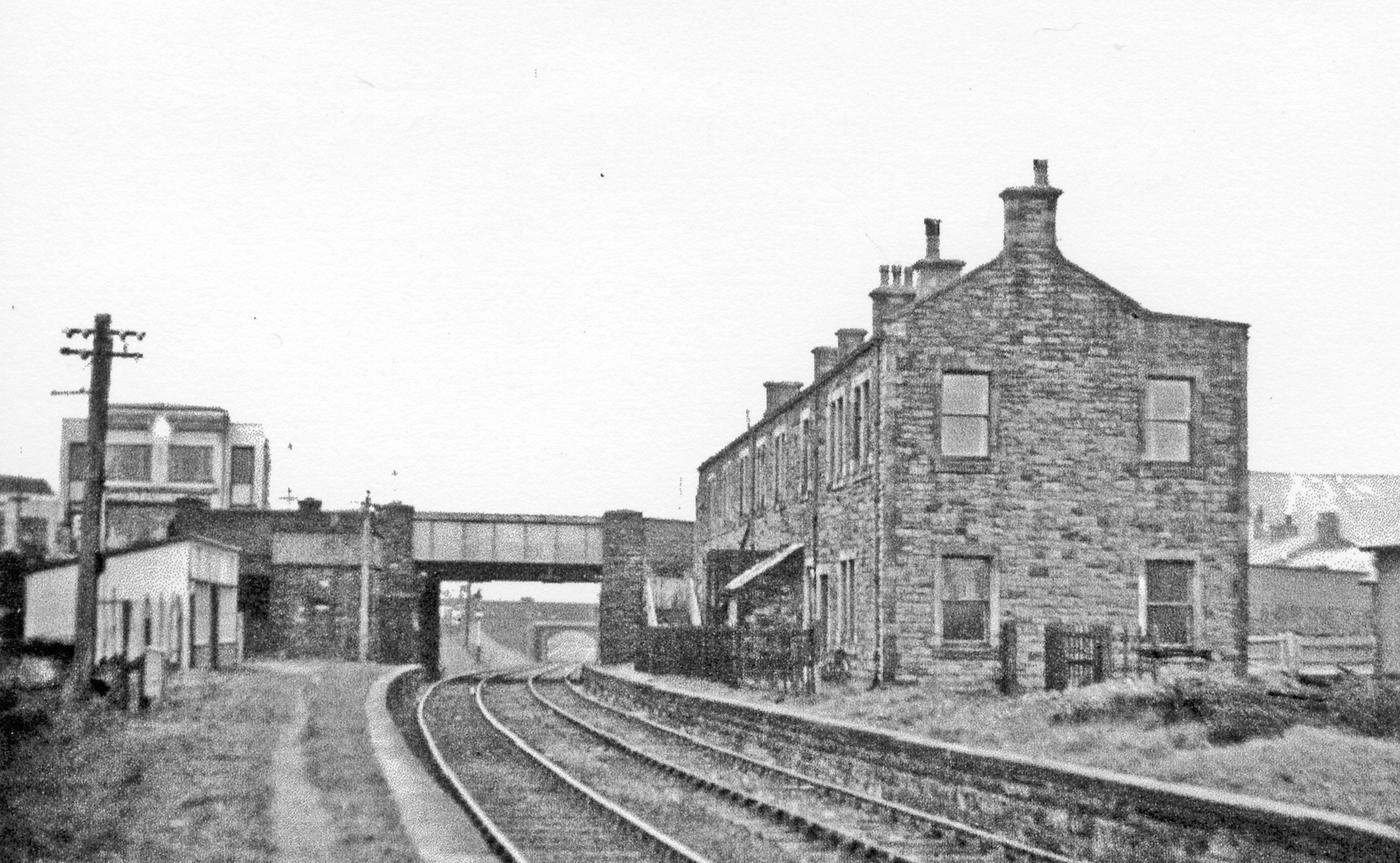
- Workington Central in 1951

General information
- Location: Workington, Cumberland; England
- Coordinates: 54.6428°N 3.5472°W
- Grid reference: NY002286
- Platforms: 2 plus bay

Other information
- Status: Disused

History
- Original company: Cleator and Workington Junction Railway

Key dates
- 1 October 1879: Opened as Workington
- 10 July 1880: Renamed Workington Central
- 13 April 1931: Closed to passengers
- 4 May 1964: Closed to goods
- 26 September 1965: Line through station closed
Location
- Location within the former Allerdale Borough Location within Cumbria

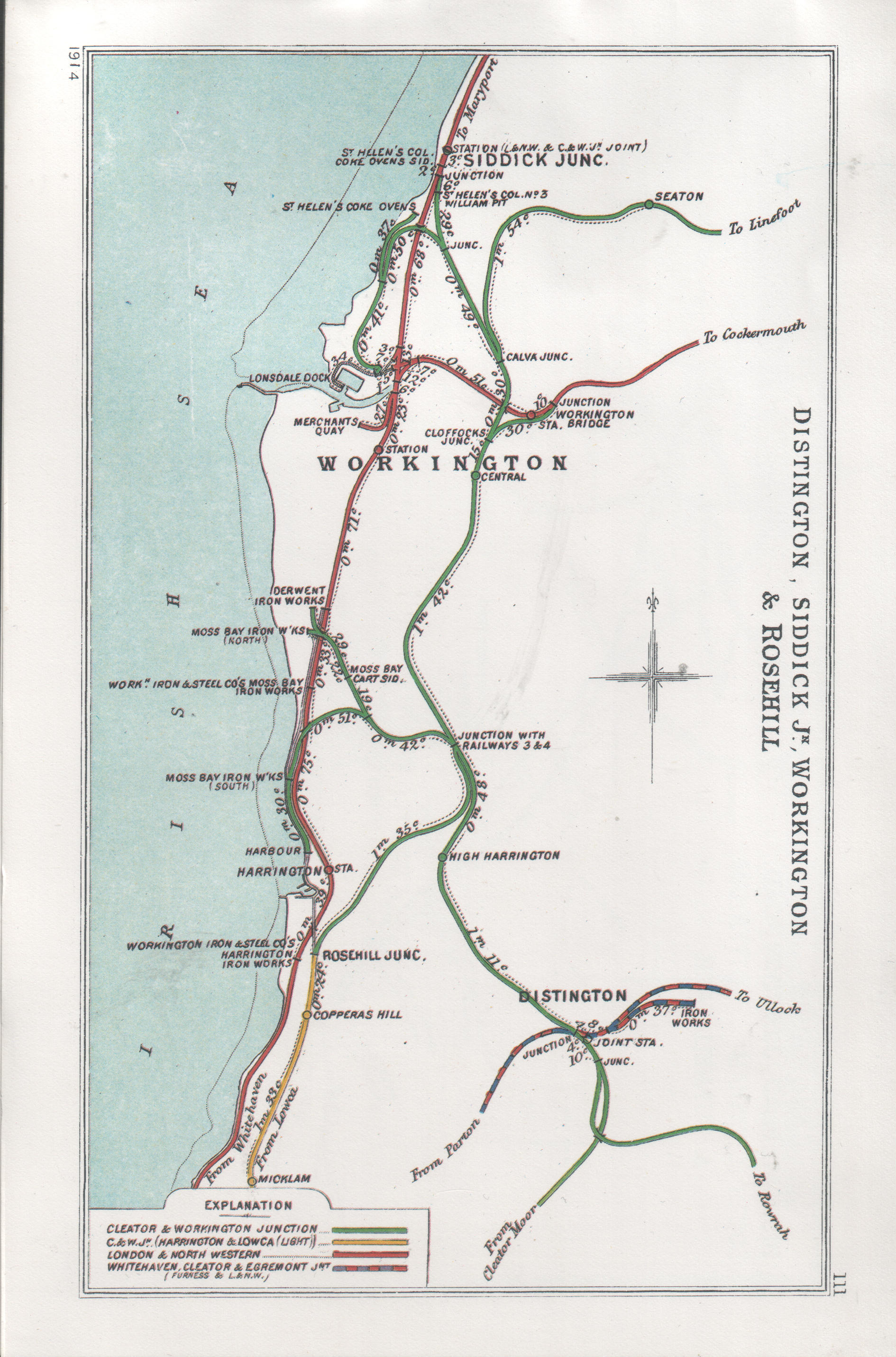
A 1914 Railway Clearing House Junction Diagram showing the complex network which existed in the Workington area

Workington Central railway station was opened by the Cleator and Workington Junction Railway (C&WJR) in 1879 to serve the town of Workington in Cumberland (now in Cumbria), England. It was situated almost half a mile nearer the town centre than its rival Workington station.

== History ==
The line was one of the fruits of the rapid industrialisation of West Cumberland in the second half of the nineteenth century, specifically being born as a reaction to oligopolistic behaviour by the London and North Western and Whitehaven, Cleator and Egremont Railways. The line and station opened to passengers on 1 October 1879. Central Station was initially the northern terminus; the line was extended northwards to Siddick Junction a year later.

All lines in the area were primarily aimed at mineral traffic, notably iron ore, coal and limestone, none more so than the new line to Workington, which earned the local name "The Track of the Ironmasters". General goods and passenger services were provided, but were very small beer compared with mineral traffic.

The founding Act of Parliament of June 1878 confirmed the company's agreement with the Furness Railway that the latter would operate the line for one third of the receipts.

The line and station became part of the London, Midland and Scottish Railway at the Grouping of 1923. The station closed to passengers eight years later under this management.

The substantial stone station housed the headquarters of the C&WJR. There were sidings to the south of the platforms. An engine shed and wagon shops were added there in November 1897. The shed was closed in May 1923; the building was then used as a wagon repair shop for many years.

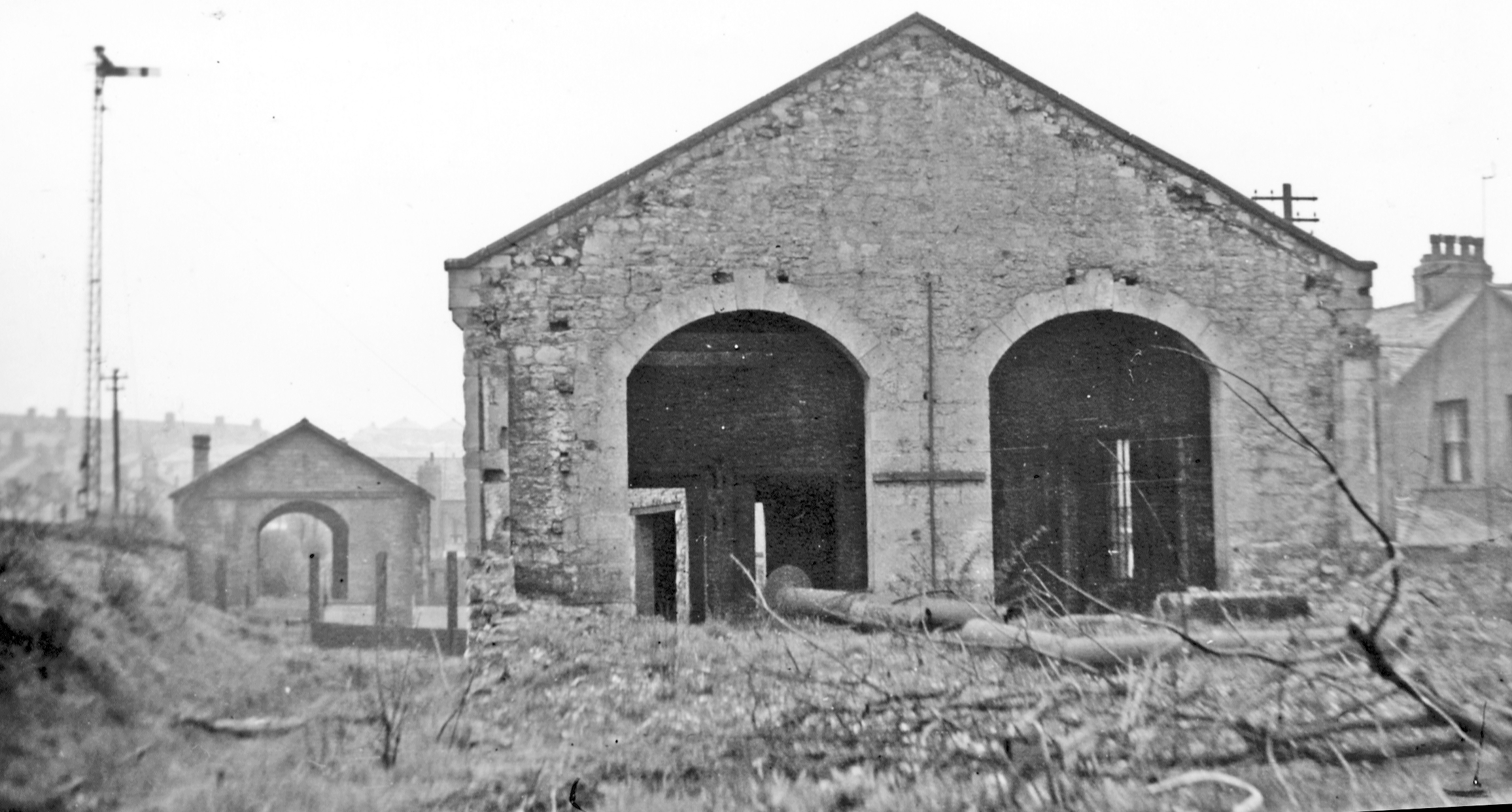
The engine shed in 1951

== Services ==
Passenger trains consisted of antiquated Furness stock hauled largely by elderly Furness engines referred to as "rolling ruins" by one author after a footplate ride in 1949.

No Sunday passenger service was ever provided on the line.

The initial passenger service in 1879 consisted of:

- Two Up (northbound) trains a day, leaving Moor Row at 09:20 and 13:45, calling at Cleator Moor, Moresby Parks, Distington, High Harrington and terminating at Workington Central, taking 30 minutes in all.
- They returned as Down trains, leaving Workington at 10:30 and 16:00

In 1880 the extension northwards to Siddick Junction was opened, crossing the River Derwent by a bridge known locally as "Navvy's Bridge". The service was extended to run to and from Siddick and an extra train was added with:

- Three up trains a day, leaving Moor Row at 07:40, 10:12 and 14:45, taking 30 minutes to Workington and an extra four to proceed to Siddick, where connections were made with northbound trains on the coastal line.
- Down trains left Siddick at 08:45, 12:22 and 17:00

By 1922 the service reached its high water mark with:

- Five up trains a day from Moor Row through to Siddick, leaving Moor Row at 07:20, 09:50, 13:15, 16:50 and 1820.
- One train Mondays to Fridays Only from Moor Row to Workington, leaving at 13:45 and also calling at Moresby Junction Halt, making that halt qualify as a publicly advertised passenger station
- One Saturdays Only train leaving Cleator Moor (NB not from Moor Row) at 12:50 for Workington
- One Saturdays Only train leaving Moor Row at 19:35 for Workington

There was one fewer Down train, as the 09:50 Up was provided to give a connection at Siddick with a fast MCR train to Carlisle with connections beyond.

Two Saturdays Only trains left Oatlands at 16:05 and 21:35 for Workington, calling at Distington and High Harrington, with balancing workings leaving Workington at 15:30 and 21:00.

There were also trains using the Lowca Light Railway plying between Lowca and Workington; they turned off the main line at Harrington Junction and therefore served no "pure" C&WJR stations other than Workington Central.

As with advertised passenger trains, in 1920 workmen's trains ran on the company's three southern routes:

- Between Workington Central and Lowca using the Lowca Light Railway
- Between Arlecdon (Rowrah's "other station") and Oatlands on the single track "Baird's Line", and
- On the "main line" between Siddick Junction and Moor Row
  - From Siddick Junction to Moor Row, calling at all passenger stations except Moresby Parks, calling at Moresby Junction Halt instead
  - From Moor Row to Moresby Junction Halt, calling at Cleator Moor and Keekle Colliers' Platform

The situation in 1922 was similar.

By 1922 a fourth route had already given up trying a passenger service; it ran north eastwards from Workington Central to Seaton (Cumbria) and beyond. This line - opened in 1887 and often referred to as the "Northern Extension" - was the half-hearted outcome of what was originally intended as a direct cross-country route to Scotland for Cumberland ore. As conceived it would have continued the founders' approach of bypassing all established interests to join up with the Caledonian Railway and send its loads to Glasgow over the Solway Viaduct. In the end it met up with the Maryport and Carlisle Railway at Linefoot Junction "in the middle of nowhere, having gone there via nowhere else."

Ironically, part of this line would go on to be the last C&WJR metals to carry trains, outliving all other lines by nearly thirty years as the result of the Royal Navy using its combination of remoteness and dock access to establish an arms store at RNAD Broughton Moor. By Autumn 1922, however, that remoteness had killed attempts to run passenger trains. The last vestige was that on Saturdays Only, two of the Lowca to Workington trains shown above continued to and returned from Seaton. An attempt to run services beyond, to Great Broughton and Linefoot, was tried in 1908, but lasted a mere two months.

The fifth route from Workington Central was authorised on 16 July 1883 and opened in March 1885. It turned sharply east at Cloffocks Junction, 15 chains (0.30 km) north of the station, joining the Workington-Penrith line immediately east of Workington Bridge. This never carried any passenger service, publicly advertised or for workmen.

In January 1898 the company agreed with the Postmaster General to carry a mail bag daily between Workington and Siddick and between Workington and Distington. It is likely that this was conveyed on passenger trains. At some point thereafter the service was extended to Rowrah. The "Mail Train" beyond Distington to Oatlands and Arlecdon usually consisted of a C&WJR 0-6-0ST and a guards van.

The 1920 Working Time Table shows relatively few Goods trains, with just one a day in each direction booked to call at Workington Central.

Mineral traffic was an altogether different matter, dwarfing all other traffic in volume, receipts and profits. The key source summarises it "...the 'Track of the Ironmasters' ran like a main traffic artery through an area honeycombed with mines, quarries and ironworks." The associated drama was all the greater because all the company's lines abounded with steep inclines and sharp curves, frequently requiring banking. The saving grace was that south of Workington at least, most gradients favoured loaded trains. During the First World War especially, the company ran "Double Trains", akin to North American practice, with two mineral trains coupled together and a banking engine behind, i.e. locomotive-wagons-guards van-locomotive-wagons-guards van-banker. Such trains worked regularly between Distington and Cleator Moor West. The practice was discontinued after dark from 1 April 1918.

Most stations on the company's lines had heavy industrial neighbours, such as ironworks next to Cleator Moor West, or served primarily industrial workforces, such as Keekle Colliers' Platform. Workington Central was rather different, with vast heavy industry within a couple of miles of the station, but not served by it and a significant town surrounding the station but few populous destinations to serve.

Like any business tied to one or few industries, the railway was at the mercy of trade fluctuations and technological change. The Cumberland iron industry led the charge in the nineteenth century, but became less and less competitive as time passed and local ore became worked out and harder to win, taking the fortunes of the railway with it. The peak year was 1909, when 1,644,514 tons of freight were handled. Ominously for the line, that tonnage was down to just over 800,000 by 1922, bringing receipts of £83,349, compared with passenger fares totalling £6,570.

| Preceding station | Disused railways | Following station |
|---|---|---|
| Siddick Junction; Line and station closed | Cleator and Workington Junction Railway | High Harrington; Line and station closed |
| Seaton (Cumbria); Line and station closed | Cleator and Workington Junction Railway | Harrington (Church Road Halt); Line and station closed |

== Rundown and closure ==
The peak year for tonnage was 1909, and for progress was 1913, with the opening of the Harrington and Lowca line for passenger traffic. A chronology of the line's affairs from 1876 to 1992 has almost no entries before 1914 which fail to include "opened" or "commenced". After 1918 the position was reversed, when the litany of step-by-step closures and withdrawals was relieved only by a control cabin and a signalbox being erected at Harrington Junction in 1919 and the Admiralty saving the northern extension in 1937 by establishing an armaments depot at Broughton.

The public passenger service to Lowca ended on 31 May 1926, followed by the workmen's trains there on 1 April 1929.

The curve from Cloffocks Junction to the Workington-Penrith line was closed on 26 March 1930 and subsequently lifted. Its key role had been to give coke from County Durham an additional route to Workington's furnaces, known locally as "The Works".

Workington Central station closed to passengers on 13 April 1931 when normal passenger traffic ended along the line. Diversions and specials, for example to football matches, continued to use the station and line, but it was not easy to use as a through north–south route because all such trains had to reverse at Moor Row or Corkickle.

The most unusual special event was when the station was used as a set for part of the film The Stars Look Down shot in 1938 and released in 1940.

The Dock Branch, which veered west off the line to Siddick north of the station closed on 27 July 1936, ending another source of custom or potential traffic through the station.

The station, like a great many across the country, remained open for goods traffic. It closed in 1964, by which time road transport had picked off all commercially viable trade.

An enthusiasts' special ran through on 6 September 1954, the only one to do so using main line passenger stock. The next such train to traverse any C&WJR metals did so in 1966 at the north end of the line, a year after the line through Workington Central closed.

== Afterlife ==
By 2013 aerial images show the trackbed through the station site had become "Central Way" used by the West Cumbria Cycle Network. The line's bridge over the River Derwent north of the station had had its railway spans replaced with ones suitable for a foot and cycleway, using the original abutments.

== See also ==
- Maryport and Carlisle Railway
- Furness Railway
- Whitehaven, Cleator and Egremont Railway
- Cockermouth and Workington Railway
