= Oatlands railway station =

Disused railway station in Cumbria, England

Oatlands

General information
- Location: Near Pica, Cumberland; England
- Coordinates: 54.5790°N 3.5098°W
- Grid reference: NY025214
- Platforms: 1

Other information
- Status: Disused

History
- Original company: Cleator and Workington Junction Railway
- Pre-grouping: Cleator and Workington Junction Railway
- Post-grouping: London Midland and Scottish Railway

Key dates
- 3 July 1883: Opened for daily services
- December 1883: Closed
- September 1888: Opened for passengers on Saturdays only
- July 1892: Closed
- November 1909: Opened for passengers on Saturdays only
- September 1922: Closed for passengers
- 1 January 1927: Closed for workmen's services
- 8 August 1938: Line and station closed completely
Location

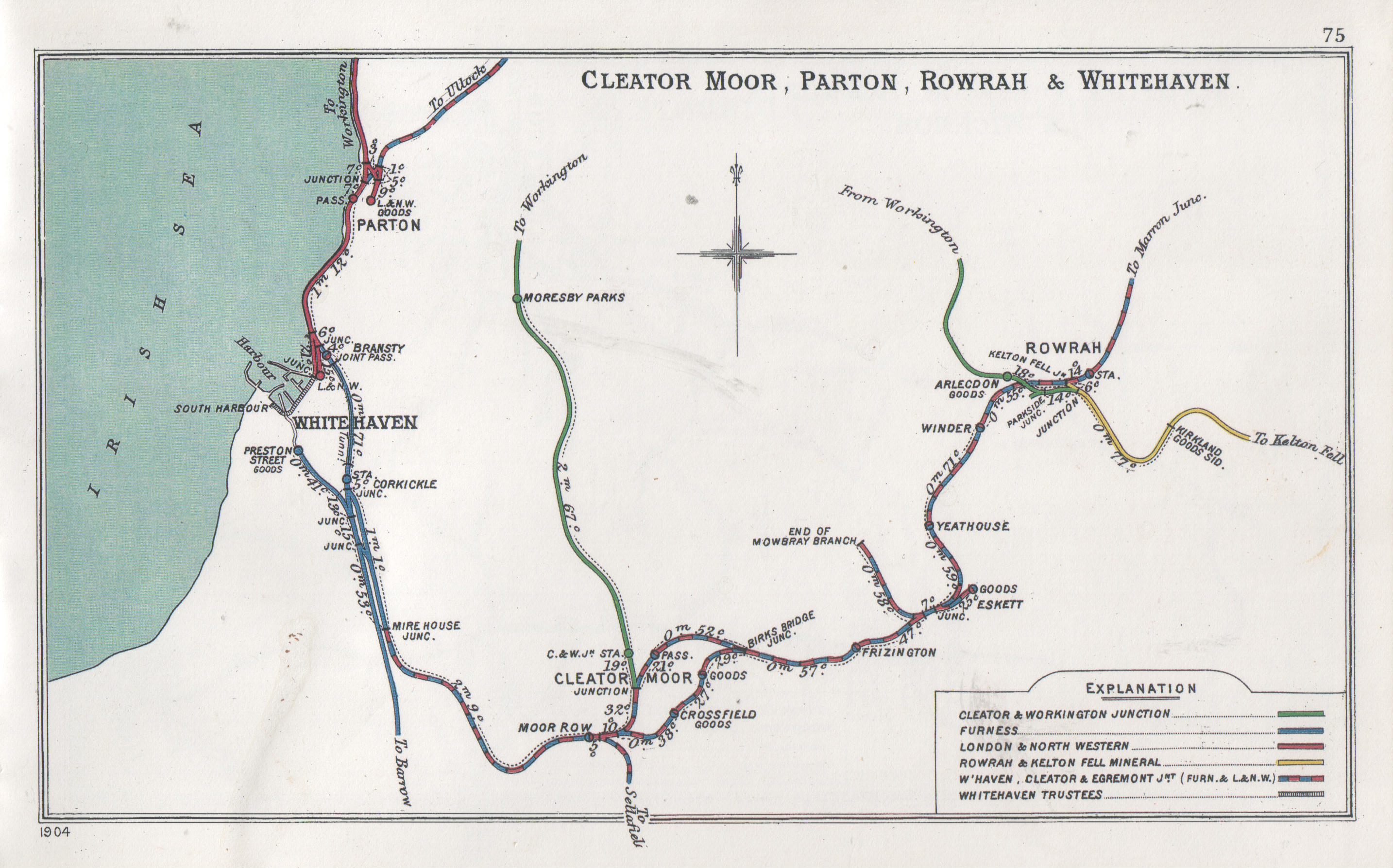
The complex lines at Arlecdon and Rowrah shown on this map dated 1904 and 1914

Oatlands railway station served the village of Pica and Oatlands Colliery in the former English county of Cumberland, now part of Cumbria.

== Location ==
The station was the only intermediate station on the Cleator and Workington Junction Railway's (C&WJR) otherwise mineral branch which left the company's Workington Central to Cleator Moor West main line at Rowrah Branch Junction south of Distington. The other station was Arlecdon at the branch's southern end. The 6 miles 41 chains (10.5 km), single track branch opened for mineral traffic on 1 May 1882 and was known locally as "Baird's Line" and officially as the Rowrah Branch.

The branch's main purpose was to access the limestone quarries at Rowrah and the iron mines served by the Rowrah and Kelton Fell Railway, (RKFR) which the branch joined 30 chains (0.60 km) beyond Arlecdon at Rowrah Junction. The branch's second purpose was to carry coal from Oatlands Colliery which was next to the station. General goods came a distant third, workmen fourth and conventional passengers a remote last.

The branch was six and a three quarter miles long, but its point to point length was a mere four and a half miles, the difference being due to the extremely sinuous course it had to take to keep the ruling gradient to a "mere" 1 in 44. The gradients largely favoured loaded trains, but they still had to cope with half a mile uphill through Arlecdon and a mile and a half uphill from Brownriggs Gill to Whillimoor Top.

== History ==
The C&WJR was one of the fruits of the rapid industrialisation of West Cumberland in the second half of the nineteenth century, specifically being born as a reaction to oligopolistic behaviour by the London and North Western and Whitehaven, Cleator and Egremont Railways.

All lines in the area were primarily aimed at mineral traffic, notably iron ore, coal and limestone, none more so than those built by the C&WJR, which earned the local name "The Track of the Ironmasters". General goods and passenger services were provided, but were very small beer compared with mineral traffic.

The founding Act of Parliament of June 1878 confirmed the company's agreement with the Furness Railway that the latter would operate the line for one third of the receipts.

== Services ==
Passenger services to Oatlands were a stuttering affair. An attempt to provide a regular Mondays to Saturdays service lasted a mere five months in 1883. In 1888 a Saturdays only out and back service to Workington Central calling at Distington and High Harrington was tried, but abandoned in 1892. Another Saturdays only attempt was made in 1909, starting at Arlecdon. It was cut back to start at Oatlands from the end of 1916 and soldiered on this basis until 1922 when it was withdrawn, never to resume. Given the sparse population of Oatlands, Arlecdon and surrounds to this day the venture had little chance of success.

Unadvertised workmen's trains fared rather better, as here the sparse population worked in the railway's favour, with significant points of employment with similar start and end shift patterns at Rowrah and Oatlands, Records do not yet show when such services started, but they outlived the public passenger services by five years, ending for good on 1 January 1927. The line's 1920 Working Time Table shows two early morning trains from Oatlands to Arlecdon which turned straight round and went back again, with a similar procedure at the early afternoon shift change.

In January 1898 the company agreed with the Postmaster General to carry a mail bag daily between Workington and Siddick and between Workington and Distington. It is likely that this was conveyed on passenger trains. At some point thereafter the service was extended to Rowrah. The "Mail Train" beyond Distington to Oatlands and Arlecdon usually consisted of a C&WJR 0-6-0ST and a guards van.

Mineral traffic was an altogether different matter, dwarfing all other traffic in volume, receipts and profits. The key source summarises it "...the 'Track of the Ironmasters' ran like a main traffic artery through an area honeycombed with mines, quarries and ironworks." The associated drama was all the greater because all the company's lines abounded with steep inclines and sharp curves, frequently requiring banking. The saving grace was that south of Workington at least, most gradients favoured loaded trains. During the First World War especially, the company ran "Double Trains", akin to North American practice, with two mineral trains coupled together and a banking engine behind, i.e. locomotive-wagons-guards van-locomotive-wagons-guards van-banker. Such trains worked regularly between Distington and Cleator Moor West. The practice was discontinued after dark from 1 April 1918.

Like any business tied to one or few industries, the railway was at the mercy of trade fluctuations and technological change. The Cumberland iron industry led the charge in the nineteenth century, but became less and less competitive as time passed and local ore became worked out and harder to win, taking the fortunes of the railway with it. The peak year was 1909, when 1,644,514 tons of freight were handled. Ominously for the line, that tonnage was down to just over 800,000 by 1922, bringing receipts of £83,349, compared with passenger fares totalling £6,570.

== Rundown and closure ==
The peak year for tonnage on C&WJR lines was 1909, and for progress was 1913, with the opening of the Harrington and Lowca line for passenger traffic. A chronology of the line's affairs from 1876 to 1992 has almost no entries before 1914 which fail to include "opened" or "commenced". After 1918 the position was reversed, when the litany of step-by-step closures and withdrawals was relieved only by a control cabin and a signalbox being erected in 1919 and the Admiralty saving the northern extension in 1937 by establishing an armaments depot at Broughton.

Bairds Line was hit from three directions:

- Iron Ore became harder and costlier to win in the mines beyond Rowrah. The RKFR last paid a dividend in 1910, with Limestone being the biggest contributor. Most mines were worked out by 1914.
- Oatlands Colliery ceased winding coal in 1932, depriving the branch of the only source of business which could not be dealt with by other routes, and
- The LMSR, who had taken over all formerly rival company lines in the area in the Grouping of 1923 saw easy savings to be made by re-routing the residual limestone traffic from Rowrah first northwards via Ullock and Marron Junction, then, some years later, via Moor Row where it continued until March 1978.

The branch closed on 8 August 1938, along with Arlecdon and Oatlands stations which, like thousands of unsung stations right up to Beeching, were still providing a local goods service. Half a mile of Baird's Line was left in place at Arlecdon to act as a "backshunt" for the trains accessing the quarries. this remained in use until 1978 and was lifted in 1980 along with all other lines serving Rowrah. The station was subsequently demolished.

== Afterlife ==
By 2013 the line of route north of Pica and south of Oatlands station was easy to see on satellite imagery, its course through the station site was much fainter. No station buildings appeared to remain.

Preceding station	Disused railways	Following station
Distington; Line and station closed	Cleator and Workington Junction Railway "Baird's Line"	Arlecdon; Line and station closed

== See also ==
- Whitehaven, Cleator and Egremont Railway
- Cockermouth and Workington Railway
