= Siddick Junction railway station =

Disused railway station in Cumbria, England

Siddick Junction
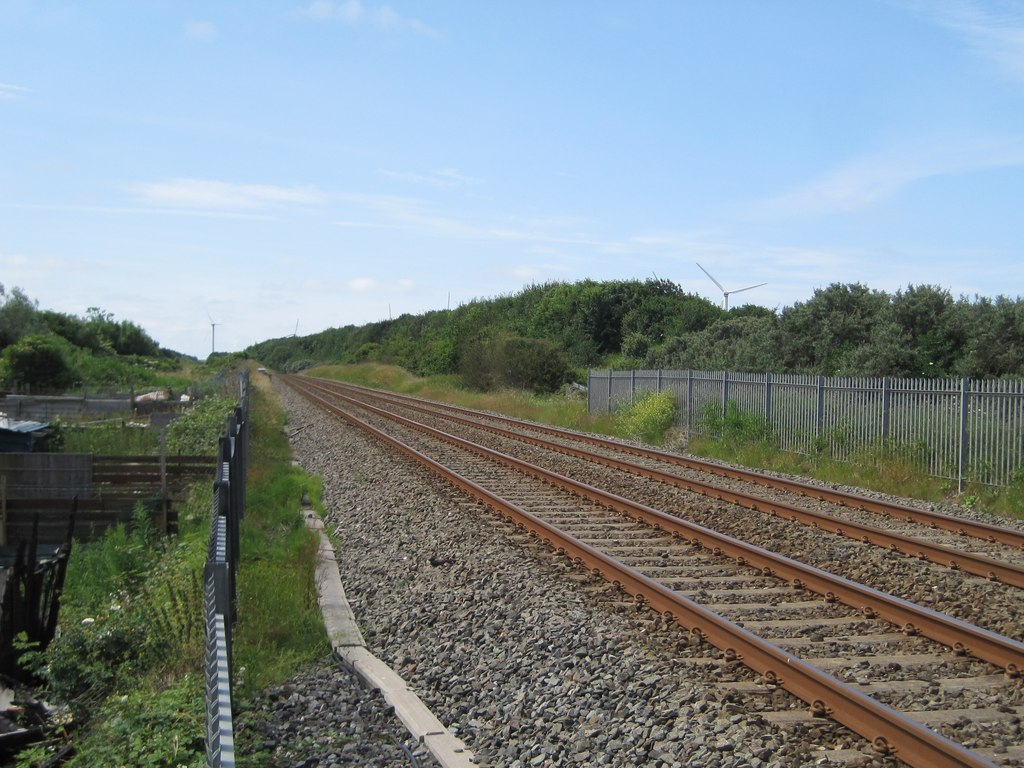
- The site of the station in 2013

General information
- Location: Siddick, near Workington, Cumberland; England
- Coordinates: 54.6649°N 3.5535°W
- Grid reference: NX998310
- Platforms: 3

Other information
- Status: Disused

History
- Original company: Cleator and Workington Junction Railway and LNWR

Key dates
- 1 September 1880: Opened for passenger exchange
- 1 March 1890: Opened as full passenger station
- 13 April 1931: Closed to passengers towards Workington Central
- 1 October 1934: Closed to passengers
Location
- Location within the former Allerdale Borough Location within Cumbria

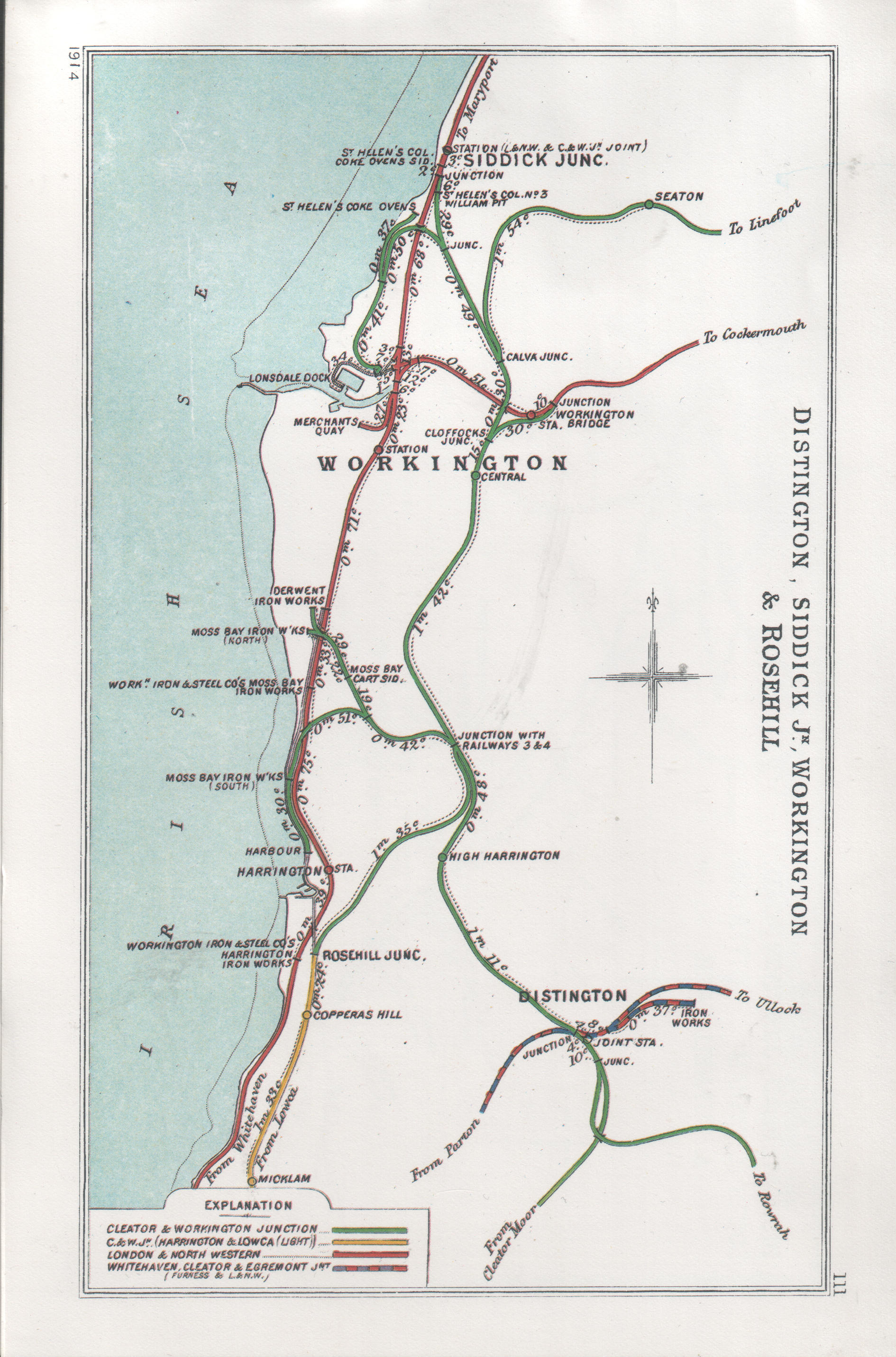
A 1914 Railway Clearing House Junction Diagram showing the complex network which existed in the Workington area

Siddick Junction railway station was opened by the Cleator and Workington Junction (C&WJR) and London and North Western Railways in 1880 to provide exchange platforms for passengers wishing to change trains from one company's line to the other. A passenger travelling from Maryport to Distington, for example, would change at Siddick Junction. As a purely exchange station - like Dovey Junction and Dukeries Junction elsewhere in the country - the owning companies would not need to provide road or footpath access or ticketing facilities as no passengers were invited to enter or leave the station except by train.

Ten years later, in 1890, the community of Siddick had grown sufficiently to justify upgrading the station to handle the full range of passengers.

The station was officially "Siddick Junction" but Bradshaw referred to it as plain "Siddick".

== History ==
The coastal line through Siddick had existed for years when the C&WJR was built in the late 1870s. The new line was one of the fruits of the rapid industrialisation of West Cumberland in the second half of the nineteenth century, specifically being born as a reaction to oligopolistic behaviour by the London and North Western and Whitehaven, Cleator and Egremont Railways.

It was originally intended to drive the new line northwards across country to meet the Caledonian Railway and cross into Scotland by the Solway Viaduct, but an accommodation was made with the LNWR leading to the intended northern extension being greatly watered down to a line through Seaton (Cumbria) and the short link from Workington Central to Siddick.

All lines in the area were primarily aimed at mineral traffic, notably iron ore, coal and limestone, none more so than the new line through to Siddick, where the junction was a general goods and passenger junction, but much more so a freight junction. The line earned the local name "The Track of the Ironmasters".

The founding Act of Parliament of June 1878 confirmed the company's agreement with the Furness Railway that the latter would operate the line for one third of the receipts.

The line and station became part of the London, Midland and Scottish Railway at the Grouping of 1923. The new line closed to passengers eight years later under this management, at a stroke depriving Siddick Junction of its greater passenger traffic. Though Siddick had grown it did not sustain the station on its own, so it closed in 1934.

There were sidings by the C&WJR lines to the southeast of the platforms, as well as an engine shed which opened with the line and closed in 1923 following a fire.

== Services ==
C&WJR passenger trains consisted of antiquated Furness stock hauled largely by elderly Furness engines referred to as "rolling ruins" by one author after a footplate ride in 1949. Most LNWR trains which called at Siddick were "Parliamentaries" calling at all stations. They had rolling stock which the company felt matched this provision.

No Sunday passenger service was ever provided on the C&WJR line. The 1922 timetable shows no LNWR trains calling at Siddick.

The initial passenger service in 1880 consisted of

- three up trains a day, leaving Moor Row at 07:40, 10:12 and 14:45, taking 30 minutes to Workington and an extra four to proceed to Siddick, where connections were made with northbound trains on the coastal line.
- Down trains left Siddick at 08:45, 12:22 and 17:00

By 1922 the service reached its high water mark, with five Up trains a day from Moor Row through to Siddick, leaving Moor Row at 07:20, 09:50, 13:15, 16:50 and 1820, all matched by Down workings.

All C&WJR trains to and from Siddick made good connections with LNWR services, for example the 07:20 ex-Moor Row terminated at Siddick Junction at 07:54. A train for most stations to Carlisle called at 08:04. This also applied southbound.

In 1922 three LNWR coastal trains in both directions called at the station at times when no C&WJR trains were timetabled, with a fourth on Mondays only.

As with advertised passenger trains, in 1920 workmen's trains ran on the W%CJR from Siddick Junction to Moor Row, calling at all passenger stations except Moresby Parks, calling at Moresby Junction Halt instead.

The 1920 Working Time Table shows relatively few Goods trains, with just one "Through goods" a day in each direction booked to pass Siddick.

Mineral traffic was an altogether different matter, dwarfing all other traffic in volume, receipts and profits. The key source summarises it "...the 'Track of the Ironmasters' ran like a main traffic artery through an area honeycombed with mines, quarries and ironworks." The associated drama was all the greater because all the company's lines abounded with steep inclines and sharp curves, frequently requiring banking. The saving grace was that south of Workington at least, most gradients favoured loaded trains. During the First World War especially, the company ran "Double Trains", akin to North American practice, with two mineral trains coupled together and a banking engine behind, i.e. locomotive-wagons-guards van-locomotive-wagons-guards van-banker. Such trains worked regularly between Distington and Cleator Moor West. The practice was discontinued after dark from 1 April 1918.

Most stations on C&WJR lines had heavy industrial neighbours, such as ironworks next to Cleator Moor West, or served primarily industrial workforces, such as Keekle Colliers' Platform. Siddick Junction followed this pattern, with sidings, and engine shed, steelworks, a colliery and a dock within sight of the station.

Like any business tied to one or few industries, the C&WJR was particularly at the mercy of trade fluctuations and technological change. The Cumberland iron industry led the charge in the nineteenth century, but became less and less competitive as time passed and local ore became worked out and harder to win, taking the fortunes of the railway with it. The peak year was 1909, when the C&WJR handled 1,644,514 tons of freight. Ominously for the line, that tonnage was down to just over 800,000 by 1922, bringing receipts of £83,349, compared with passenger fares totalling £6,570.

== Rundown and closure ==
The high water mark for tonnage on the C&WJR was 1909, the high water mark for progress was 1913, with the opening of the Harrington and Lowca line for passenger traffic. A chronology of the line's affairs from 1876 to 1992 has almost no entries before 1914 which fail to include "opened" or "commenced". After 1918 the position was reversed, when the litany of step-by-step closures and withdrawals was relieved only by a control cabin and a signalbox being erected at Harrington Junction in 1919 and the Admiralty saving the northern extension in 1937 by establishing an armaments depot at Broughton.

Passenger services to Workington Central and beyond ended on 13 April 1931 when normal passenger traffic ended along the C&WJR. Siddick Junction station closed to all passengers three years later. Diversions and specials, for example to football matches, made use of the C&WJR line, but it was not easy to use as a through north–south route because all such trains would have to reverse at Moor Row or Corkickle.

An enthusiasts' special reversed at Siddick on 6 September 1954 to gain access to the C&WJR line, the only one to traverse the C&WJR using main line passenger stock. The next such train to traverse any C&WJR metals did so in 1966 turning onto the north end of the remains of the C&WJR at Siddick Junction, a year after the line through Workington Central closed.

The last C&WJR metals to carry trains was accessed through Siddick Junction, followed by reversal at Calva Junction to gain access to the line through Seaton (Cumbria). This was the originally enfeebled Northern Extension which had been made all but redundant by the Workington Central to Siddick Junction connection. Ironically this outlived all other C&WJR lines by nearly thirty years as the result of the Royal Navy using its combination of remoteness and dock access to establish an arms store at RNAD Broughton Moor.

== Afterlife ==
The coastal route through Siddick Junction is very much a live railway. In 2009 bridges over the River Derwent were washed away. The temporary Workington North was built a short distance south of the site of Siddick Junction.

In 2013 satellite images showed little trace of Siddick Junction station.

Preceding station	Disused railways	Following station
Flimby	Cleator and Workington Junction Railway	Workington Central; Line and station closed
Flimby	LNWR	Workington

== See also ==
- Whitehaven, Cleator and Egremont Railway
- Cockermouth and Workington Railway
