= RNAD Broughton Moor =

Armaments depot of the British Royal Navy

Coordinates: 54.66968°N 3.46680°W

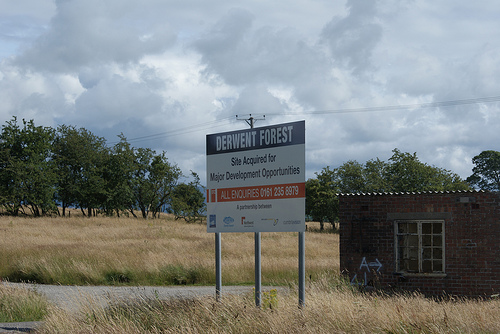
Sign at the entrance to RNAD Broughton Moor

RNAD Broughton Moor is a decommissioned Royal Naval Armaments Depot located between Great Broughton and Broughton Moor in the County of Cumbria, England.

== History ==
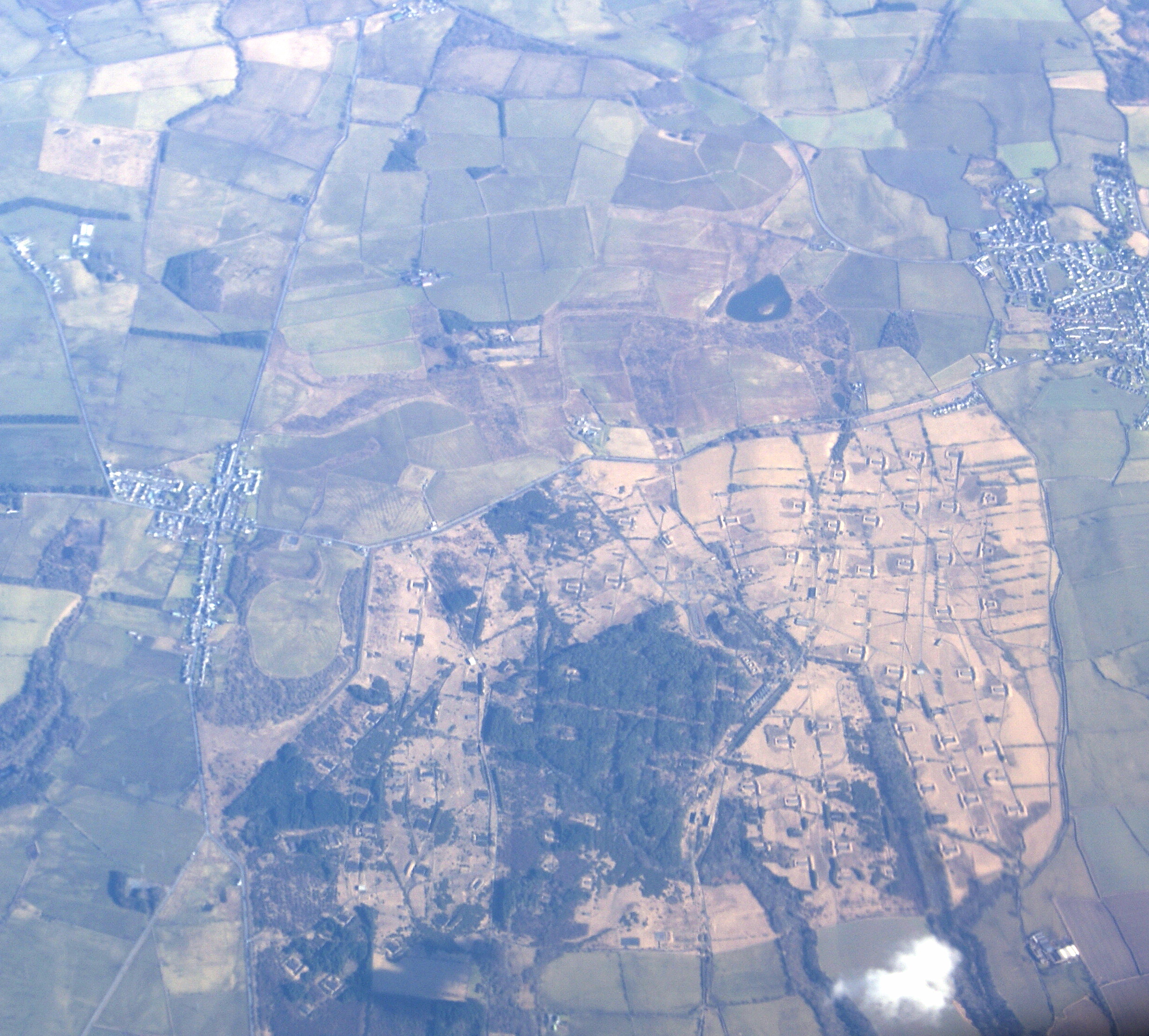
Aerial view

The depot was opened in 1939 on the site of Buckhill Colliery (opened 1873, closed 1932; the colliery's spoil heap remains a prominent feature of the site to this day). In 1944 the site was expanded from 800 to 1050 acres.

The depot continued to be used by the Ministry of Defence until 1963, at which point it was leased to the Federal Republic of Germany. From 1977 it was used by the United States Navy for storage of armaments for its North Atlantic Squadron (the weapons were flown out of the site by helicopters shuttling back and forth over a number of days to a USN Cargo Ship lying offshore and away from the town's harbour of Workington); and from 1981 Broughton Moor was formally adopted as a NATO storage site.

The site was decommissioned at the end of the Cold War, finally closing on 31 December 1992.

=== Railway ===
The site had a 2 ft 6 in (762 mm) narrow gauge railway. Locomotives from this railway are preserved on the Almond Valley and Whipsnade railways. In 1970 the locomotives in use at Broughton Moor consisted of:

- Navy Department standard gauge diesel locomotives:
  1 x Hunslet 4wDM
  1 x Ruston & Hornsby 4wDM Class 165DS.
- Navy Department 2 ft 6 in (762 mm) narrow gauge locomotives:
  2 x Hunslet 0-4-0DM 25HP
  4 x Hunslet 0-4-0DM 50HP
  2 x Ruston & Hornsby 4wDM Class 20DL, (Nos. R1/2)
  6 x Ruston & Hornsby 4wDM Class 48DL, (Nos. R4/6/7/8/10/12).
- Ministry of Public Buildings & Works 2 ft 6 in (762 mm) narrow gauge locomotives:
  2 x Motor Rail 4wDM
  2 x Hunslet 4wDM

The site was connected to the main line via a 5-mile (8 km) branch line to Siddick Junction, north of Workington railway station and utilised a headshunt at Northside to change direction northbound on to the Cumbrian Coast Line. The branch closed on 4 June 1992, being the last part of the Cleator and Workington Junction Railway in operation.

The railway equipment at RNAD Broughton Moor was sold by tender in April and July 1992 and consisted of approximately 3 miles of standard gauge track and 25 miles of narrow gauge (2 ft 6in) track. The sale also included 4 standard gauge locomotives built by Ruston & Hornsby and Hunslet, 27 narrow gauge locomotives by the same builders and 127 wagons, including 6 box vans, 4 brake vans (2 x 4tons & 2 x 6 tons) and 99 flat wagons.

=== Accidents ===
An explosion occurred at RNAD Broughton Moor on 18 January 1944 which resulted in the death of 11 people and left 70 people injured. The coroners hearing was reported in the Cumberland Evening Star in February 1944. The explosion appears to have occurred in one of the traverse laboratories, photos showing the aftermath include a 2 ft 6 in (762 mm) gauge box van No. 267.

== Present day ==
The large majority of the buildings and bunkers remain along with underground storage and an extensive network of storage sheds and other military buildings. Ownership of the site was transferred from the Ministry of Defence to Allerdale Borough Council in 2008 who have yet to decide what to do with the site. The site was purchased by the Borough Council for £1. In October 2008 Cumbria County Council called for interest in the redevelopment of the site rebranded as Derwent Forest. As yet there has been little interest due to the huge cost involved with cleaning up the site. There are unexploded ordnance and large amounts of asbestos as well as unmarked mine shafts when it was a colliery prior to World War II. Furthermore, having previously ruled out allowing the site to be used for coal mining, Allerdale council later agreed to allow mining by any prospective future owners as a way to raise funding for any potential tourism development.

It was announced on 13 January 2011 that the two shortlisted developers for the site would not mine the site, allaying fears about the environmental impact of the development of the site. A decision was due by the end of February 2011.

On 31 August 2018 the Derwent Forest Development Consortium and utropia revealed a masterplan to develop the site including 1200-2000 houses, a hotel, lodges, and other facilities. Work was due to begin in 2020. Planning permission for building houses on the site was rejected by the local council in 2022.
