= Cleator Moor railway station =

Former railway station in England

Cleator Moor

General information
- Location: Cleator Moor, Cumberland; England
- Coordinates: 54.5232°N 3.5203°W
- Grid reference: NY016152
- Platforms: 2

Other information
- Status: Disused

History
- Original company: Whitehaven, Cleator and Egremont Railway
- Pre-grouping: LNWR & FR Joint Railway
- Post-grouping: London, Midland and Scottish Railway

Key dates
- 1 July 1857: Opened
- 1866: Closed to passengers, new station 600 yards west
- 1960s: Closed completely
Location
- Location within the former Borough of Copeland Location within Cumbria

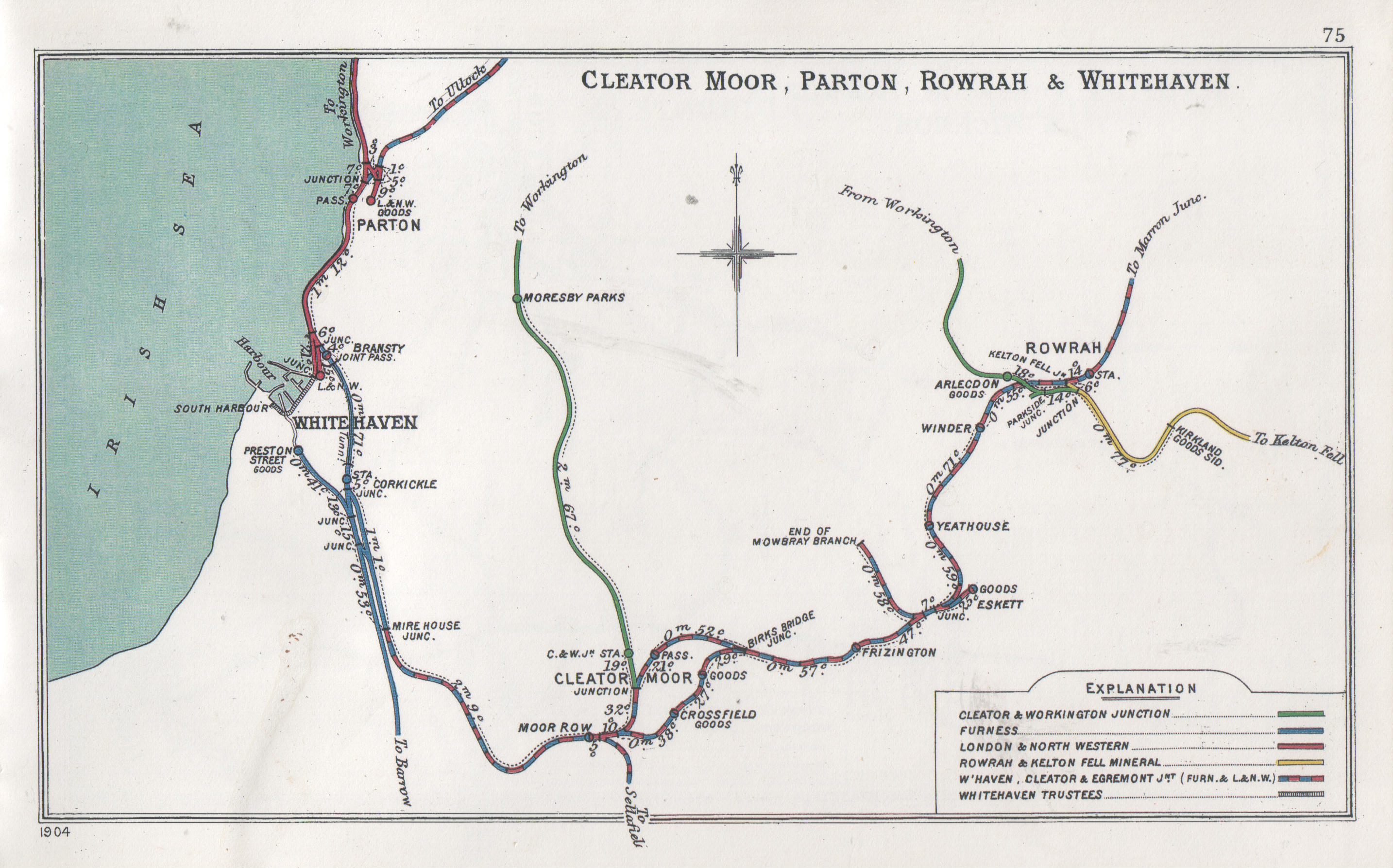
1904 railway junctions around Cleator Moor, Parton, Rowrah & Whitehaven

The original Cleator Moor railway station was built by the Whitehaven, Cleator and Egremont Railway. It served the rapidly urbanising town of Cleator Moor, Cumbria, England.

== History ==
The line was one of the fruits of the rapid industrialisation of West Cumberland in the second half of the nineteenth century. The station opened to passengers on 1 July 1857 on the line being developed from Moor Row to Rowrah.

Subsidence led the company to build a deviation line which curved round the west side of the station and the growing settlement, in a similar manner to what it was forced to do at Eskett a few miles to the east. They built a passenger station on the deviation line which would go on to be called Cleator Moor East.

When the deviation line - known locally as the Bowthorn Line - and station opened in 1866 the original station was closed to passengers and became "Cleator Moor Goods Depot", with its line known locally as the Crossfield Loop. It remained open for goods traffic until the 1960s.

== Afterlife ==
Satellite images suggest the station site is Public Open Space. By 2008 the trackbed had been transformed into part of National Cycle Route 71.

Preceding station	Disused railways	Following station
Frizington; Line and station closed	Whitehaven, Cleator and Egremont Railway	Moor Row; Line and station closed

== See also ==
- Furness Railway
- Cleator and Workington Junction Railway
