= Cleator Moor East railway station =

Disused railway station in Cumbria, England

Cleator Moor East

General information
- Location: Cleator Moor, Cumberland; England
- Coordinates: 54.5254°N 3.5281°W
- Grid reference: NY011155
- Platforms: 2

Other information
- Status: Disused

History
- Original company: Whitehaven, Cleator and Egremont Railway
- Pre-grouping: LNWR & FR Joint Railway
- Post-grouping: London, Midland and Scottish Railway

Key dates
- 1866: Opened as "Cleator Moor", replaced original station
- 2 June 1924: Renamed "Cleator Moor East"
- 13 April 1931: Closed to passengers
- 11 March 1940: Reopened to workmen's trains
- 8 April 1940: Closed
Location
- Location within the former Borough of Copeland Location within Cumbria

Cleator Moor has had three passenger stations:

- The original 1857 Cleator Moor station which became a goods station when it was replaced in 1866. Its 1866 replacement which went on to be known as Cleator Moor East, and the rival 1879 station which went on to be known as Cleator Moor West.

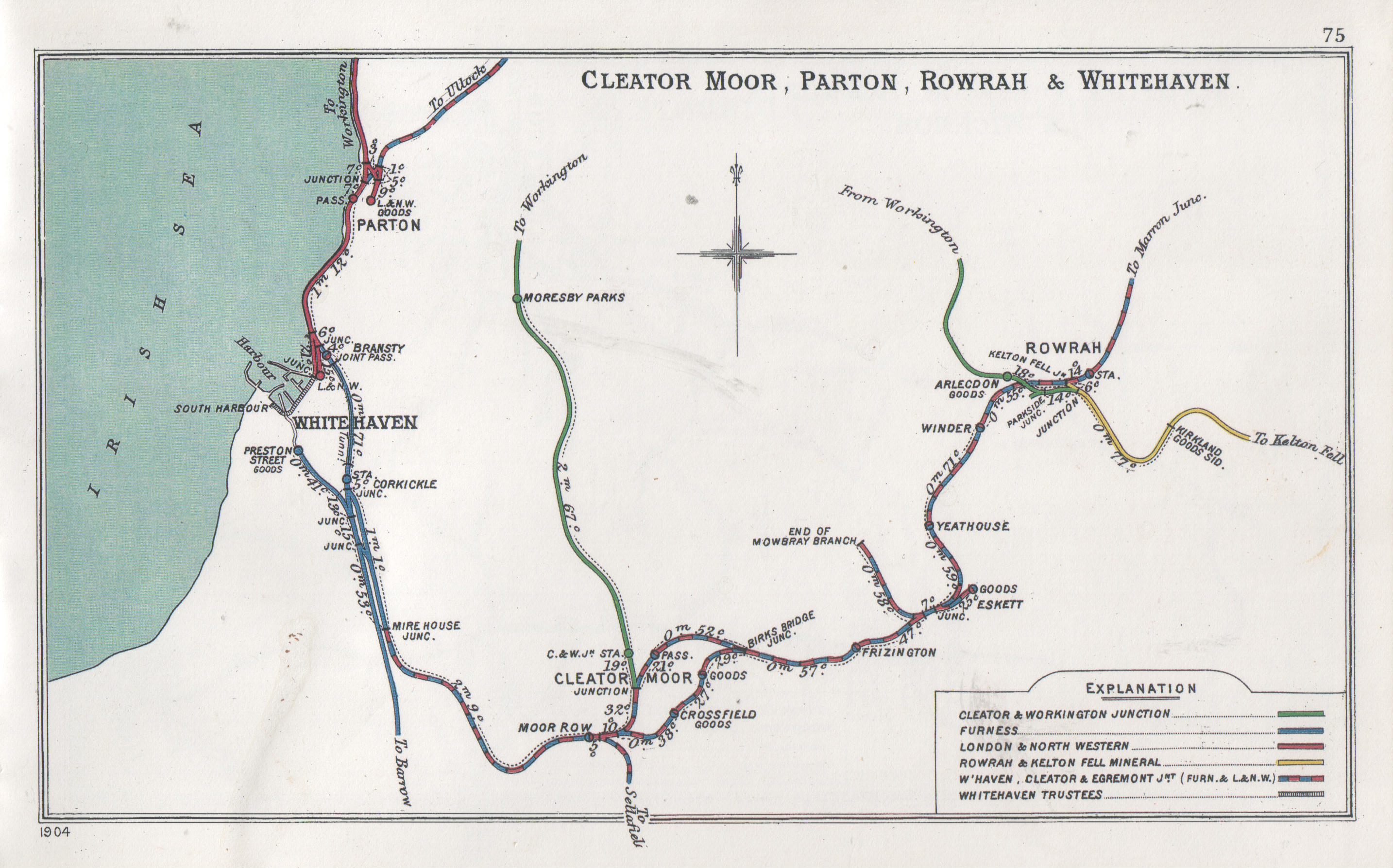
1904 railway junctions around Cleator Moor, Parton, Rowrah & Whitehaven

Cleator Moor East railway station was the second station built by the Whitehaven, Cleator and Egremont Railway in the growing industrial town of Cleator Moor, Cumbria, England.

== History ==
The line was one of the fruits of the rapid industrialisation of West Cumberland in the second half of the nineteenth century. The original Cleator Moor station opened to passengers on 1 July 1857 on the line being developed from Moor Row to Rowrah.

Subsidence led the company to build a deviation line which curved round the west side of the original station and the growing settlement, in a similar manner to what it was forced to do at Eskett a few miles to the east. They built a passenger station on the deviation line - known locally as "The Bowthorn Line" - which would go on to be called Cleator Moor East.

When the deviation line and station opened in 1866 the original station was closed to passengers and became "Cleator Moor Goods Depot." It remained open for goods traffic until the 1950s.

== Services ==
Whilst some Whitehaven, Cleator and Egremont Railway (WCER) mineral, goods and passenger traffic to and from Rowrah passed north along the line to Marron Junction, the greater part arrived and left southwards towards Moor Row and therefore passed through Cleator Moor. Mineral traffic was also generated locally from the quarries and mines such as the Iron Works within sight of the station.

In 1922 seven all stations passenger trains called at Cleator Moor East in each direction, with an extra on Whitehaven Market Day. Four were Rowrah to Whitehaven services, the other three plied a long, circuitous route between Workington Main and Whitehaven via Camerton, Marron Junction, Ullock, Rowrah and Moor Row.

Cleator Moor East station's owning Whitehaven, Cleator and Egremont company was taken over by the LNWR and Furness Railway in 1879 as a Joint Line, whereafter the section through the station was usually worked by the LNWR.

Goods traffic typically consisted of two daily turns Up and Down.

Mineral traffic was the dominant flow, though this was subject to considerable fluctuation with trade cycles. Stations and signalling along the line south of Rowrah were changed during the Joint regime to conform to Furness Railway standards.

== Rundown and closure ==
The station closed on 13 April 1931 when normal passenger traffic ended along the line, though workmen's trains were reinstated in March 1940, only to be withdrawn a month later. An enthusiasts' special ran through on 5 September 1954. After scant occasional use the line northwards from Rowrah was abandoned in 1960 and subsequently lifted.

The line southwards from Rowrah through Cleator Moor East lead a charmed life, continuing with a limestone flow from a quarry at Rowrah until 1978, after which all traffic ceased and the tracks were lifted.

== Afterlife ==
By 2013 the station appeared to have been demolished and some of the trackbed had become a Public Open Space.

Preceding station	Disused railways	Following station
Frizington; Line and station closed	Whitehaven, Cleator and Egremont Railway	Moor Row; Line and station closed

== See also ==
- Furness Railway
- Cleator and Workington Junction Railway
