= Weddicar =

Civil parish in Cumbria, England

Coordinates: 54.559°N 3.514°W

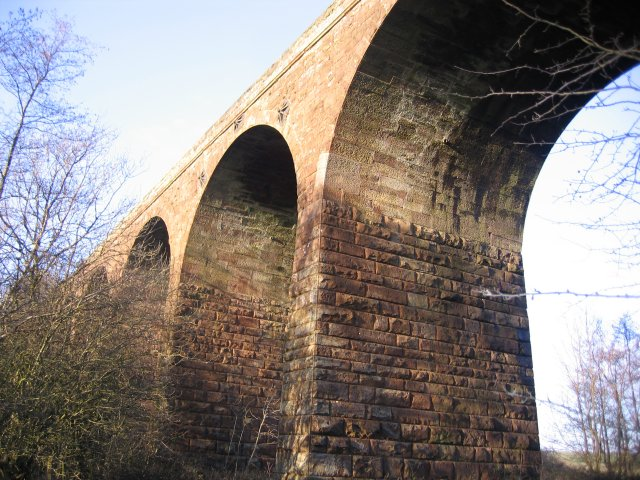
Keekle Viaduct carried the Cleator and Workington Junction Railway over the River Keekle near Keekle in the parish

Weddicar is a civil parish in Cumberland, Cumbria, England. At the 2011 census it had a population of 451.

The parish has an area of 712.98 hectares (1,761.8 acres). It lies east of Whitehaven and west of Cleator Moor; the main settlement is the hamlet of Keekle. The northwestern boundary of the parish follows the River Keekle. The B 5295 road from Whitehaven to Cleator Moor crosses the parish, as did the Cleator and Workington Junction Railway (closed 1992, now dismantled although Keekle Viaduct remains).

There is a parish council, the lowest level of local government.

== Listed buildings ==
There are two listed buildings in the parish: Nether End Farmhouse at grade II* and another farmhouse at grade II.
