= Yeathouse railway station =

Former railway station in England

Yeathouse

General information
- Location: Yeathouse, Frizington, Cumberland; England
- Coordinates: 54.5374°N 3.4797°W
- Grid reference: NY043167
- Platforms: 2

Other information
- Status: Disused

History
- Original company: Whitehaven, Cleator and Egremont Railway
- Pre-grouping: LNWR & FR Joint Railway
- Post-grouping: London, Midland and Scottish Railway

Key dates
- 11 June 1872: Opened, replacing Eskett
- 13 April 1931: Closed
- 11 March 1940: Reopened for workmen's trains
- 8 April 1940: Closed
Location

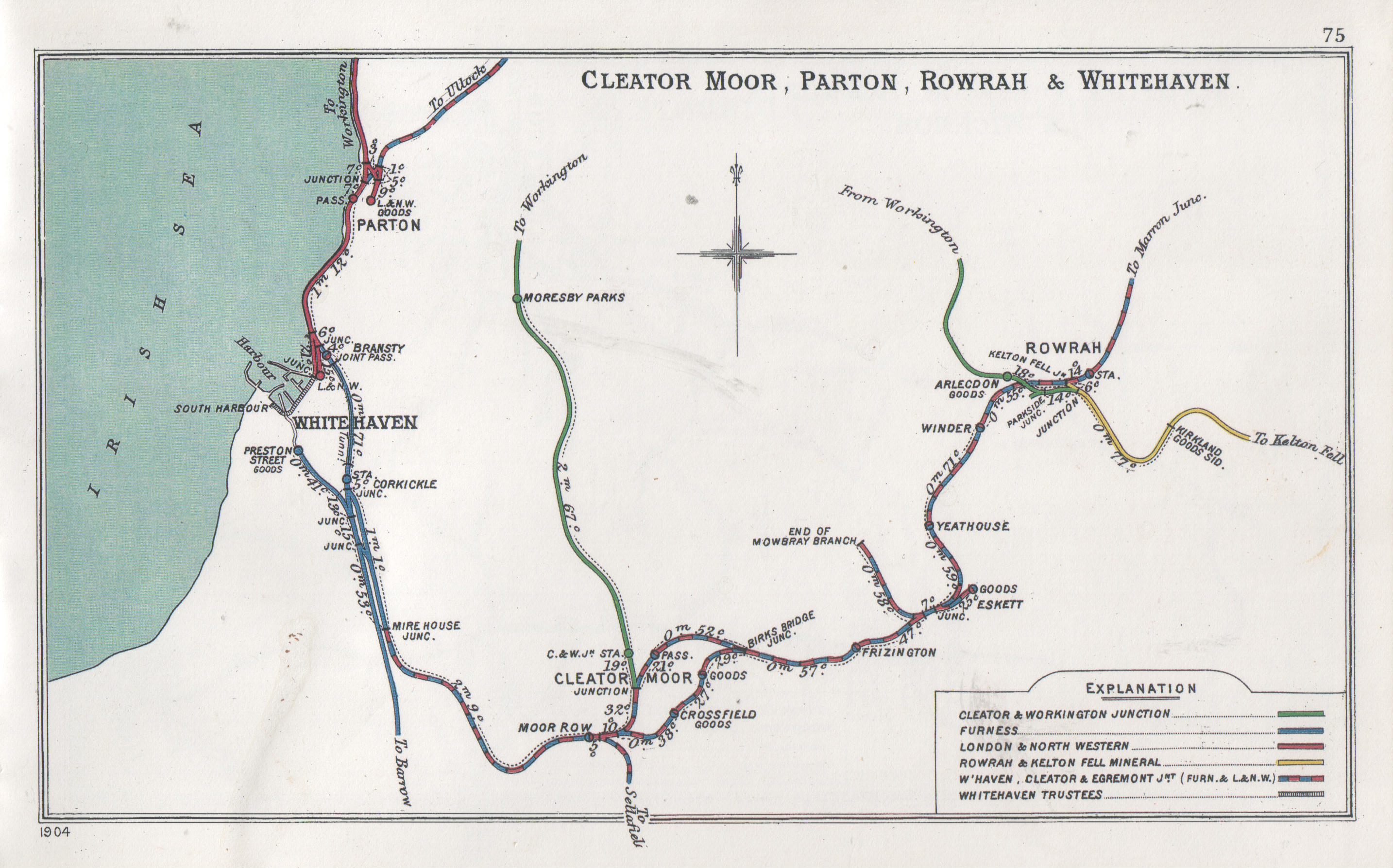
1904 railway junctions around Cleator Moor, Parton, Rowrah & Whitehaven

Yeathouse railway station was a later addition to the Whitehaven, Cleator and Egremont Railway. It served the communities of Yeathouse and Eskett, near Frizington, Cumbria, England.

== History ==
The line was one of the fruits of the rapid industrialisation of West Cumberland in the second half of the nineteenth century.

Eskett station opened to passengers with the line from Moor Row to Rowrah on 12 February 1864. The section of line through the station suffered subsidence problems so severe that the company built a deviation line to an alignment curving sharply and steeply to the west, including a new passenger station at Yeathouse. When the deviation and new station opened on 11 June 1872 the old alignment was severed north of Eskett station, which was converted to a goods depot. It remained as such until final closure in 1931.

The deviation made the line even more difficult to work for the rest of its existence.

== Services ==
Whilst some Whitehaven, Cleator and Egremont Railway (WCER) mineral, goods and passenger traffic to and from Rowrah passed north along the line to Marron Junction, the greater part arrived and left southwards towards Moor Row and therefore passed through Yeathouse. Mineral traffic was also generated locally from the quarries and mines such as Yeathouse Quarry workings on a branch heading southeast immediately north of Yeathouse station.

In 1922 seven all stations passenger trains called at Yeathouse in each direction, with an extra on Whitehaven Market Day. Four were Rowrah to Whitehaven services, the other three plied a long, circuitous route between Workington Main and Whitehaven via Camerton, Marron Junction, Ullock, Rowrah and Moor Row.

Yeathouse station's owning Whitehaven, Cleator and Egremont company was taken over by the LNWR and Furness Railway in 1879 as a Joint Line, whereafter passenger traffic through the station was usually worked by the LNWR.

Goods traffic typically consisted of a two daily turns Up and Down.

Mineral traffic was the dominant flow, though this was subject to considerable fluctuation with trade cycles. Stations and signalling along the line south of Rowrah were changed during the Joint regime to conform to Furness Railway standards.

== Rundown and closure ==
The station closed on 13 April 1931 when normal passenger traffic ended along the line, though workmen's trains were reinstated in March 1940, only to be withdrawn a month later.

The line southwards from Rowrah through Yeathouse lead a charmed life, continuing with a limestone flow from a quarry at Rowrah until 1978, after which all traffic ceased and the tracks were lifted.

== Afterlife ==
By 2008 Yeathouse station had been demolished. The trackbed had been transformed into part of National Cycle Route 71.

Preceding station	Disused railways	Following station
Winder; Line and station closed	Whitehaven, Cleator and Egremont Railway	Frizington; Line and station closed

== See also ==
- Furness Railway
- Cleator and Workington Junction Railway
