= Rowrah and Kelton Fell Railway =

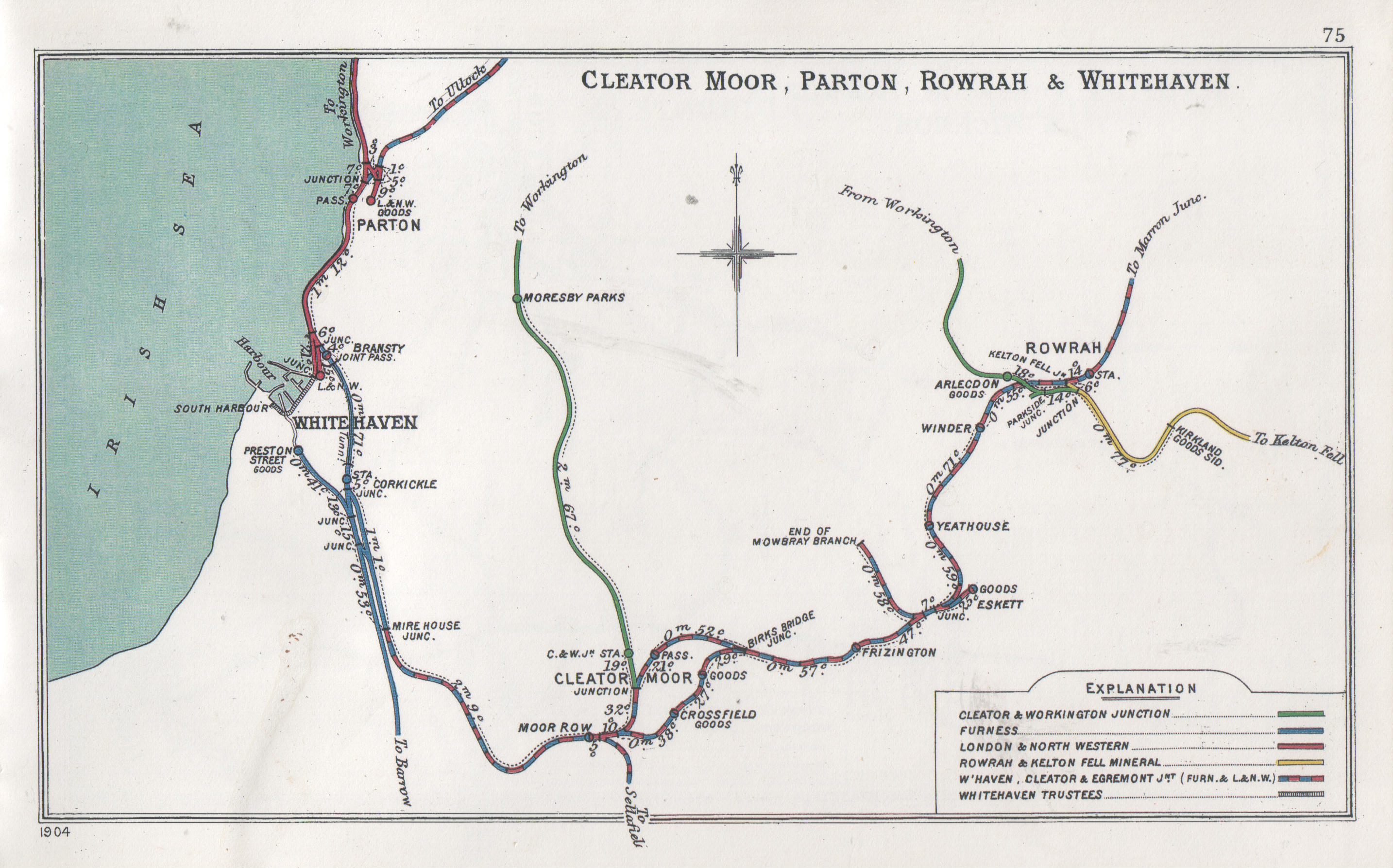
All four routes in to and out of Rowrah are clearly shown on this map dated 1904 and 1914

The Rowrah and Kelton Fell Railway was a standard gauge mineral railway in Cumberland, England, which was operated by William Baird and Company of Glasgow, Scotland. It opened in 1877 and closed in 1926.

== Route ==
The line ran south from Rowrah to Sheriff Gate where it branched into three. One line ran south-west to Salter Hall Quarry; a second ran south to Stockhow; a third ran east to Kirkland, for Bankstead mine. The Kirkland branch continued east to Kelton Fell and Knockmurton mines. There were junctions with both the Whitehaven, Cleator and Egremont Railway and the Cleator and Workington Junction Railway near Rowrah.

== Locomotives ==
| Name | Wheels | Builder | Notes |
|---|---|---|---|
| ? | 0-6-0ST | ? | ex-Whitehaven, Cleator and Egremont Railway |
| Salter | 0-4-0ST | Manning Wardle | |
| Wyndham | 0-6-0ST | Manning Wardle | |
| Dinah | 0-6-0ST | Manning Wardle | |
| Derwent | 0-6-0ST | Manning Wardle | Purchased 1925 from Moor Row Iron Mines |

== Closure ==
Knockmurton mine closed about 1920; Bankstead mine closed 1921; Salter Hall quarry and the railway closed 1926. The track was lifted in 1934.

== See also ==
- Rowrah railway station
- Arlecdon railway station

== Sources ==
- McGowan Gradon, W. (2004) [1952]. The Track of the Ironmasters: A History of the Cleator and Workington Junction Railway. Grange-over-Sands: Cumbrian Railways Association. ISBN 0-9540232-2-6.
