= Winder railway station =

Disused railway station in Cumbria, England

Winder

General information
- Location: Winder, Frizington, Cumberland; England
- Coordinates: 54.5486°N 3.4726°W
- Grid reference: NY048180
- Platforms: 2

Other information
- Status: Disused

History
- Original company: Whitehaven, Cleator and Egremont Railway
- Pre-grouping: LNWR & FR Joint Railway
- Post-grouping: London, Midland and Scottish Railway

Key dates
- 12 February 1864: Opened
- June 1874: Closed to passengers
- May 1875: Reopened to passengers
- 13 April 1931: Closed to passengers
- 11 March 1940: Reopened to workmen's trains
- 8 April 1940: Closed
Location

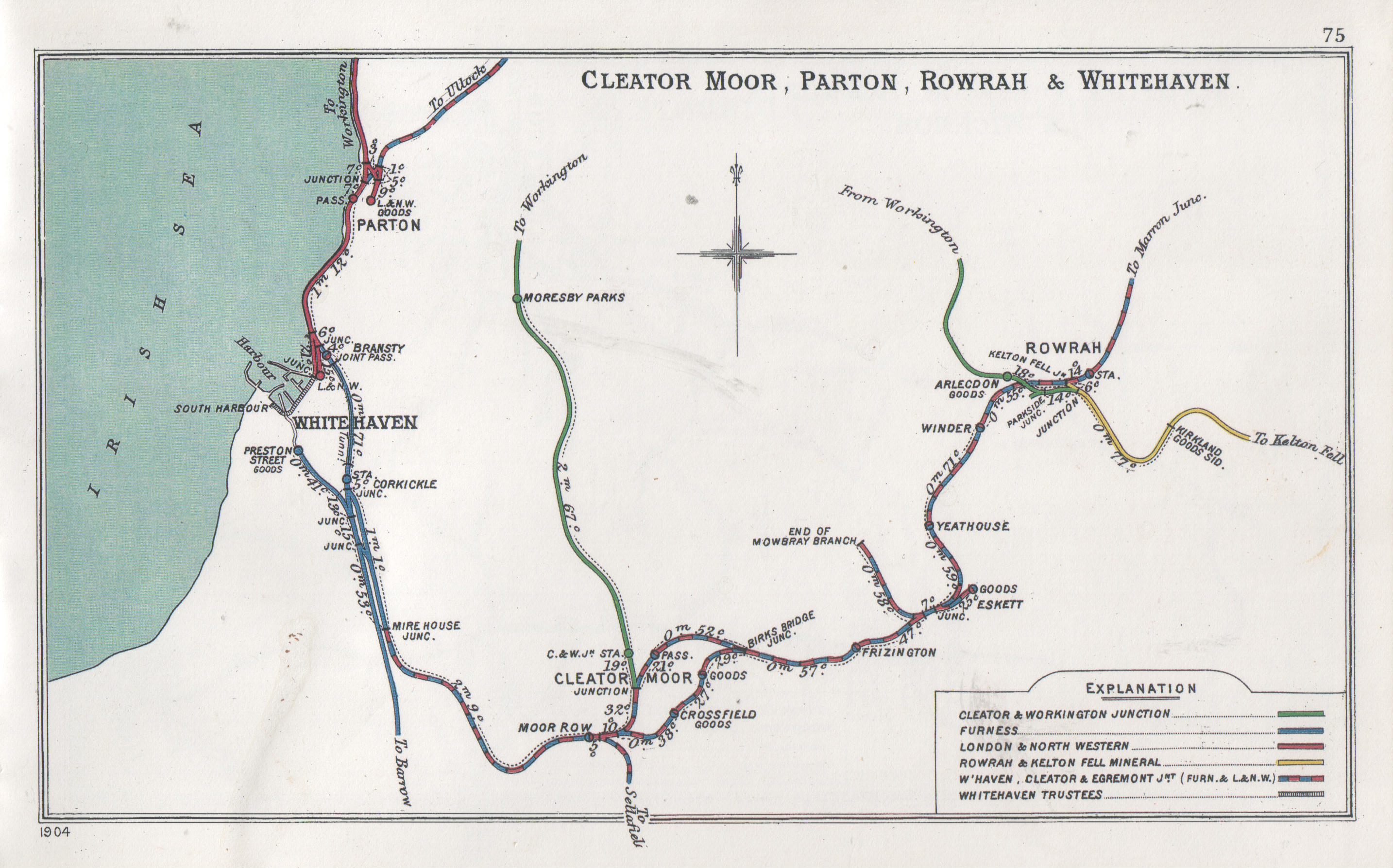
1904 railway junctions around Cleator Moor, Parton, Rowrah & Whitehaven

Winder railway station was built by the Whitehaven, Cleator and Egremont Railway. It served the village of Winder, Frizington, Cumbria, England.

== History ==
The line was one of the fruits of the rapid industrialisation of West Cumberland in the second half of the nineteenth century. The station opened to passengers with the line from Moor Row to Rowrah on 12 February 1864. The station closed for a year in the 1870s, then remained in continuous use until closure with the steep decline of the area's industrial fortunes in the Twentieth Century.

== Services ==
Whilst some Whitehaven, Cleator and Egremont Railway (WCER) mineral, goods and passenger traffic to and from Rowrah passed north along the line to Marron Junction, the greater part arrived and left southwards towards Moor Row and therefore passed through Winder. Mineral traffic was also generated locally from the quarries and mines such as the Postlethwaite's, Salterhall and Florence workings on a branch heading southeast immediately south of Winder station.

In 1922 seven all stations passenger trains called at Winder in each direction, with an extra on Whitehaven Market Day. Four were Rowrah to Whitehaven services, the other three plied a long, circuitous route between Workington Main and Whitehaven via Camerton, Marron Junction, Ullock, Rowrah and Moor Row.

Winder Station's owning Whitehaven, Cleator and Egremont company was taken over by the LNWR and Furness Railway in 1879 as a Joint Line, whereafter passenger traffic through the station was usually worked by the LNWR.

Goods traffic typically consisted of a two daily turns Up and Down.

Mineral traffic was the dominant flow, though this was subject to considerable fluctuation with trade cycles. Stations and signalling along the line south of Rowrah were changed during the Joint regime to conform to Furness Railway standards.

== Rundown and closure ==
The station closed on 13 April 1931 when normal passenger traffic ended along the line, though workmen's trains were reinstated in March 1940, only to be withdrawn a month later. An enthusiasts' special ran through on 5 September 1954. After scant occasional use the line northwards from Rowrah was abandoned in 1960 and subsequently lifted.

The line southwards from Rowrah through Winder lead a charmed life, continuing with a limestone flow from a quarry at Rowrah until 1978, after which all traffic ceased and the tracks were lifted.

== Afterlife ==
By 2008 Winder Station was a private residence, complete with a platform. The trackbed had been transformed into part of National Cycle Route 71.

Preceding station	Disused railways	Following station
Rowrah; Line and station closed	Whitehaven, Cleator and Egremont Railway	Eskett; 1864-1872
Rowrah; Line and station closed	Whitehaven, Cleator and Egremont Railway	Yeathouse; 1872-1931

== See also ==
- Furness Railway
- Cleator and Workington Junction Railway
