= Listed buildings in Cleator Moor =

Cleator Moor is a civil parish in the Cumberland district, Cumbria, England. It contains 15 listed buildings that are recorded in the National Heritage List for England. All the listed buildings are designated at Grade II, the lowest of the three grades, which is applied to "buildings of national importance and special interest". The parish contains the villages of Cleator Moor and Cleator, and the surrounding countryside. The listed buildings include churches and associated structures, houses and associated structures, shops, a bank, civic buildings including offices and a library, and a memorial fountain.

== Buildings ==
Name and location	Photograph	Date	Notes
St Leonard's Church; 54.50686°N 3.52389°W		12th century	The nave was rebuilt in 1841–42 by George Webster, and further alterations were carried out in 1900–03 by J. H. Martindale. The chancel is Norman and built in large blocks of sandstone and has pilaster buttresses, the rest of the church is in rubble with stepped buttresses and castellated parapets, and the roofs are slated with coped gables and apex crosses. The church consists of a west baptistry, a nave with a north porch, and a chancel with a vestry. At the west end, over the porch, is a gabled double bellcote.
Old Hall and wall 54.50661°N 3.52339°W	—	Late 17th century	Originally a hall, later altered, extended and subdivided to form a symmetrical group of nine houses. They are rendered, most with slate roofs. The central house, originally the hall, has three storeys, three bays, a rear wing, and a porch. It is flanked by two-storey two-bay houses, each with a bracketed cornice, and one with a porch. The outer houses project forward, they have two storeys and three bays, the central bay projecting forward and gabled. Most windows are sashes. Along the front of the houses is a wall of sandstone and boulders, with semicircular coping, and pair of monolithic gate posts.
Troughton House; 54.53433°N 3.52187°W	—	Late 18th or early 19th century	A stuccoed house on a moulded plinth with corner pilasters, an eaves string course, and a slate roof with coped gables. There are two storeys, an L-shaped plan, a symmetrical front of three bays, and a recessed two-bay wing to the right. Steps lead up to the doorway that has a rectangular fanlight, an architrave, and a cornice. The windows are sashes in stone surrounds, and in the wing is a porch.
The Flosh; 54.50985°N 3.51833°W	—	1832	Originally a country house, later used as offices, then a hotel. It was enlarged in 1837, and in 1866 a wing in Elizabethan style was added to the south. The building is roughcast with sandstone dressings on a chamfered plinth, with a string course and a Welsh slate roof. There are two storeys and a south front of seven bays. On the south front is a castellated porch with gargoyles in the corners, and gables with decorative bargeboards. The east front has four bays and two gabled dormers. The windows are mullioned or mullioned and transomed.
5 Jacktrees Road and verandah 54.52130°N 3.51715°W	—	1856	The verandah was added to the former Cooperative shop in 1876. The building is in rendered rubble and has a Welsh slate roof with coping at the south end. There are three storeys and 13 bays. In the ground floor is a 20th-century shop front with original fluted and panelled pilasters. In the upper floors are sash windows with stone surrounds. The cast iron verandah rests on a cornice above the shop front; it is glazed and carried on 13 Gothic columns with pierced spandrels.
St John's Church; 54.52340°N 3.52377°W		1870–72	The church was designed by C. J. Ferguson in Norman style, and restored in 1900. It is in sandstone with quoins and buttresses, and has a slate roof with coped gables. The church consists of a nave with a clerestory, aisles, a chancel with chapels, and a west tower. The tower has three stages, and there is a stair turret to the south. All the windows have round arches and hood moulds.
St Mary's Church; 54.51260°N 3.51455°W		1872	A Roman Catholic church by E. W. Pugin, it is in sandstone with slate roofs. The church consists of a nave and chancel under one roof, a clerestory, transepts, and a chancel with chapels. The entrance front has a single-storey porch with a lean-to roof, a central doorway and flanking lancet windows. Above the porch are three tall lancets, and an elaborate bellcote. This contains three lancet niches, two circular niches with statues, and a bell in an arched opening.
13–20 High Street and 1 Union Street; 54.52144°N 3.51553°W	—	Late 19th century	A row of eight shops, stuccoed, with a cornice over the shop fronts, a string course, an eaves cornice, and a hipped Welsh slate roof. There are three storeys and each shop has two bays. In the ground floor are 20th-century shop fronts, the shops separated by panelled pilasters with acanthus capitals. Above the windows in the middle floor are pediments, triangular and segmental alternating in pairs, and the top floor windows have stuccoed surrounds. The Union Street front has four bays and contains a doorway and a decorative panel.
National Westminster Bank; 54.52178°N 3.51764°W	—	Late 19th century	The bank is in stone on a chamfered plinth, with a string course, an egg and dart cornice, an eaves cornice, and a slate roof with moulded gables surmounted by finials and containing dormers. There are two storeys, an attic, and five bays. The central doorway has an architrave and a serpentine head. The ground floor windows and dormers also have serpentine heads, and between some ground floor windows are engaged Ionic columns. Also on the front are polygonal pilasters.
Local Government Offices; 54.52121°N 3.51628°W	—	1879	These comprise two buildings of similar design at right angles to each other. The older contains offices and a market hall, and the other smaller building of 1894 originated as a library. They are in sandstone with hipped slate roofs. Each has a symmetrical front of a single tall storey and five bays, and a central portico with granite columns and a pediment. Steps lead up to the doors that have architraves and semicircular fanlights. The windows are sashes in architraves.
Memorial fountain 54.52133°N 3.51614°W	—	1903	The fountain is in polished grey and pink granite. It has three steps, a moulded plinth, a squat inscribed drum, and a large bowl. From this a column rises and carries a smaller bowl. It was originally surmounted by a pelican, but this is missing.
Lych gate and walls, St Leonard's Church; 54.50710°N 3.52395°W	—	c. 1903	Designed by J. H. Martindale, the walls and the plinths of the lych gate are in sandstone. On the plinths is a wooden braced superstructure carrying a slate roof with gablets. On each side the walls, which are about 3 feet (0.91 m) high, form quadrants that are ramped at the ends. On the walls are wrought iron scrolled railings 18 inches (460 mm) high, and on the ends are cast iron lamp supports.
Library; 54.52110°N 3.51593°W	—	1906	The library is in sandstone on a chamfered plinth, and has a hipped Welsh slate roof. The symmetrical front has a single tall storey and five bays. The doorway is flanked by granite columns and has a pediment and an inscribed frieze; the door has an architrave and a semicircular fanlight with a mullioned window above. The windows are mullioned and transomed in architraves, and are separated by pilasters.
Cleator war memorial 54.50798°N 3.52046°W	—	1922	The war memorial is in a walled enclosure by the side of the road. It is in grey granite, and consists of an urn with a floral swag on a three-tier pedestal with rosettes and egg and dart moulding on the cornice. This stands on a plinth with a moulded foot on a three-tiered base. On the plinth are stone plaques with inscriptions and the names of those lost in the two World Wars. The enclosure has sandstone walls with embattled coping, decorative iron railings, and a gate.
Cleator Moor war memorial 54.52365°N 3.52341°W	—	1922	The war memorial is in the churchyard of St John's Church. It is in pink granite, and consists of a Celtic cross on a tapering shaft, which stands on a tapering four-sided plinth on one step. On the head of the cross is carved knot work, and on the lower part of the shaft and on the plinth are inscriptions and the names of those lost in the First World War. At the foot of the cross is a tablet with an inscription relating to the Second World War, and the memorial is surrounded by a low wall and eight square posts.
