= Keekle =

Hamlet in Cumbria, England

Coordinates: 54.532°N 3.539°W

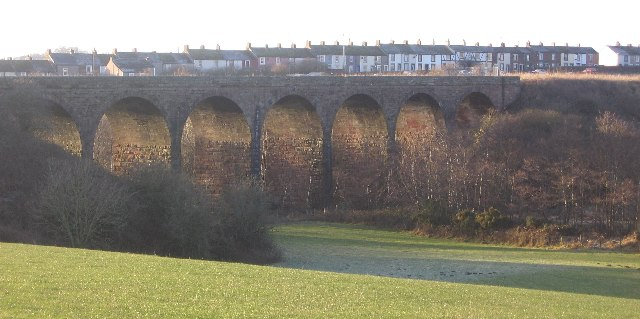
- Keekle Viaduct

- Location in Copeland Borough Location within Cumbria
- OS grid reference: NY004162
- Civil parish: Weddicar
- Unitary authority: Cumberland
- Ceremonial county: Cumbria
- Region: North West
- Country: England
- Sovereign state: United Kingdom
- Post town: CLEATOR MOOR
- Postcode district: CA25
- Dialling code: 01946
- Police: Cumbria
- Fire: Cumbria
- Ambulance: North West
- UK Parliament: Whitehaven and Workington

Keekle is a hamlet in Cumbria, England. It is located just to the northeast of Goose Butts (which is approximately 22 km (14 mi) from Cockermouth) along the B5295 road. The River Keekle flows past the eastern edge of the settlement. Keekle Viaduct has not carried trains since 1963.
