= Cleator =

Village in Cumbria, England

Coordinates: 54.508°N 3.521°W

- Village
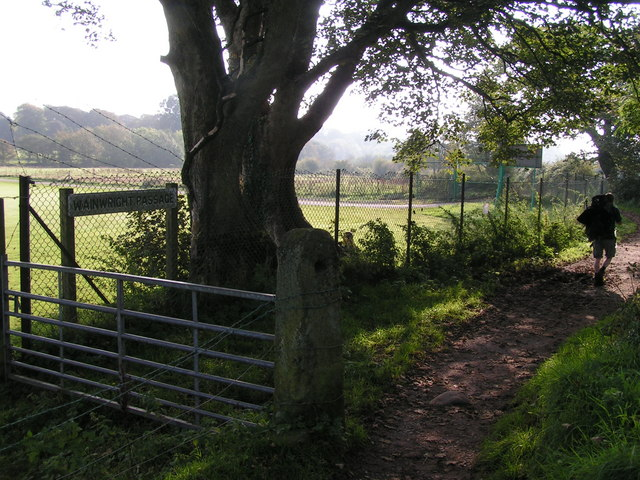
- Coast-to-Coast Path, near Cleator

- Location within Cumbria
- OS grid reference: NY015135
- Civil parish: Cleator Moor
- Unitary authority: Cumberland
- Ceremonial county: Cumbria
- Region: North West
- Country: England
- Sovereign state: United Kingdom
- Post town: CLEATOR
- Postcode district: CA23
- Dialling code: 01946
- Police: Cumbria
- Fire: Cumbria
- Ambulance: North West
- UK Parliament: Whitehaven and Workington

Cleator /ˈkliːtər/ is a village in the civil parish of Cleator Moor, in the Cumberland district of Cumbria, England. Cleator is located on the edge of the Lake District, with Dent Fell on the skyline to the south east. It is included in many nature initiatives such as Alfred Wainwright's Coast to Coast Walk.

Cleator is near the port town of Whitehaven and lies 1½ miles south of the town of Cleator Moor on the A5086 road. Cleator was the original village, Cleator Moor being the moor above the village. It is the site of the former Kangol hat factory. The factory buildings and shop are now closed. Cleator is located on the River Ehen, which is joined by the River Keekle at Longlands Lake.

On Thursday 19 November 2009, rainfall of over 300 mm was recorded in Cumbria. The surge of water off the fells of the Lake District flowed back to the Irish Sea down the rivers of West Cumbria, including the River Derwent which caused flooding and damage at Keswick, Cockermouth and Workington. The River Ehen burst its banks at Cleator, near to the Kangol factory, flooding fields and a number of residential properties.

Cleator Cricket Club, whose home is the picturesque J.D. Campbell Memorial Ground, field three teams, the 1st XI playing in the North Lancashire League. On 8 September 2013 the club achieved fame by winning the National Village Cup at Lord's Cricket Ground in London. They defeated the Gloucestershire team of Rockhampton by 1 wicket with 8 balls to spare in a tense and closely fought final.

Though they had in common a history in mining, Cleator village has no connection with the township of the same name, now reportedly little more than a ghost town, formerly called Turkey Creek, at the base of the Bradshaw Mountains in central Arizona, in the Southwestern United States. That township was founded in 1864 during a gold rush, and in 1925 it was purchased by the Manx-born James P. Cleator (died 1959), who named it after himself.

== Churches ==
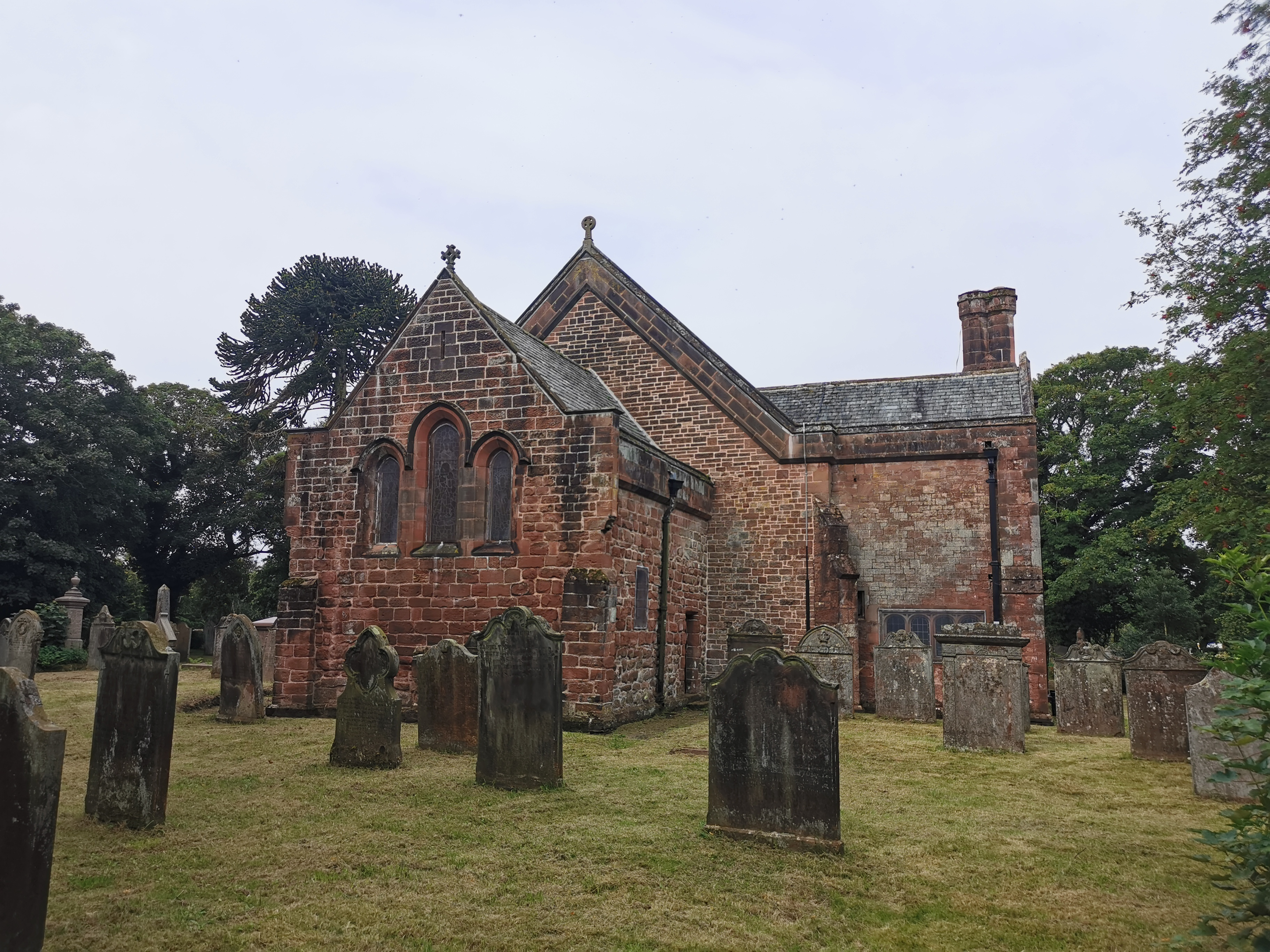
Parish Church of St Leonard

Though it has required construction repairs in later centuries, an ancient church has survived in the village, St Leonard's, whose site may have housed an earlier building even as early as the 5th century. While the current building underwent major interventions in 1841 and in 1900–1903, the chancel dates at least in part to the 12th century. Since the Reformation (16th century) the present building has been the Anglican parish church. The grounds are entered through a lychgate and there is a churchyard. The saint to whom the church is dedicated is presumably to be identified with Saint Leonard of Noblac or of Limoges, a 6th-century monk and hermit whose popularity spread rapidly throughout Europe in the 12th century. Numerous Christian churches with the same dedication currently exists throughout the world.

The sizeable Catholic St Mary's Church (officially titled Our Lady of the Sacred Heart) was designed by the architect E. W. Pugin (the son of the better-known A.W.N. Pugin, whose works include the Houses of Parliament). The church was constructed in the years 1869–1872 and opened in 1872. Here, too, there is a churchyard and the grounds include a grotto, constructed to give work to the unemployed men of the parish during the depression of 1926. Modelled on that of Lourdes, it is the venue for an annual procession.

Other churches in the area, located in nearby Cleator Moor, include the Methodist Church, first built in 1862 and rebuilt in 1934 after a fire; also the Grade II listed Anglican Church of St John Evangelist, designed in an Anglo-Norman style by the Carlisle-born architect Charles John Ferguson (1840–1904) and consecrated in 1872. Other nonconformist chapels, now closed, included the Presbyterian church, the Primitive Methodist chapel, a Congregational chapel, and a United Methodist Free church.

== Governance ==
Cleator forms part of the civil parish of Cleator Moor. There are two tiers of local government covering Cleator Moor, at parish (town) and unitary authority level: Cleator Moor Town Council and Cumberland Council. The town council is based in the Market Square in Cleator Moor.

=== Administrative history ===
Cleator was an ancient parish in the historic county of Cumberland. By the mid-19th century, there was acknowledged to be a need for more modern forms of local government to manage the rapid growth of the area, particularly in light of the development of Cleator Moor as effectively a new town on the former moorland to the north of Cleator village. An attempt to establish a local government district covering the whole parish of Cleator was rejected at a public meeting in May 1864, but later that year a smaller Cleator Moor local government district covering just part of the parish was created.

The Cleator Moor local government district was subsequently enlarged to cover the whole parish of Cleator in 1880. Although the district then covered the same area as the parish, the parish kept the name Cleator whereas the district was called Cleator Moor. Such districts were reconstituted as urban districts under the Local Government Act 1894.

Cleator Moor Urban District was abolished in 1934. Instead, the parish of Cleator was renamed Cleator Moor, reclassified as a rural parish and given a parish council, and it was included in the Ennerdale Rural District. Ennerdale Rural District was abolished in 1974, becoming part of the Borough of Copeland in the new county of Cumbria. Copeland was in turn abolished in 2023 when the new Cumberland Council was created, also taking over the functions of the abolished Cumbria County Council in the area.

== Industry and population trends ==
Cleator was the site of a number of textile mills (originally linen), and the Kangol firm established itself there in 1938. Following the development of iron ore mining in nearby areas, Cleator was the site of associated works (hence the street name "Kiln Brow" and the location "The Forge"). Longlands Lake nature reserve is on the site of the former Longlands iron ore mine, which first produced ore in 1879 from four pits. By 1924 the Cleator mines had been abandoned. In 1939 they started to subside and flood the area, creating Longlands Lake, which was acquired by Cumbria County Council in 1980.

The population of the village has varied considerably over the years, reflecting the fortunes of local industrial development. An estimate for 1688 (the year of the Glorious Revolution) put the number at 330, and it had increased but little, to 362, by 1801. It then more than doubled, to 763, by 1841. This was the beginning of an expansion which continued for the greater part of the rest of the century, with the arrival of immigrants from Ireland, and, thanks to mining prospects, even from Cornwall. Developments included the creation on the former common to the north of what by the 1880s became the town of Cleator Moor. By 1861 the population had reached 3,995, and increased to well over double the figure only twenty years later, in 1881, when it stood at 10,420. That was the peak. Numbers fell to 8,120 by 1901 and a half-century later in 1951 were registering 6,411. Changed conditions once more brought the figure to 7,686 by 1971; and it had reduced again to 6,939 in 2001.

Cleator village is now classed as part of the built up area of Cleator Moor by the Office for National Statistics.

== See also ==
- Listed buildings in Cleator Moor
