= Keekle Viaduct =

Bridge in United Kingdom

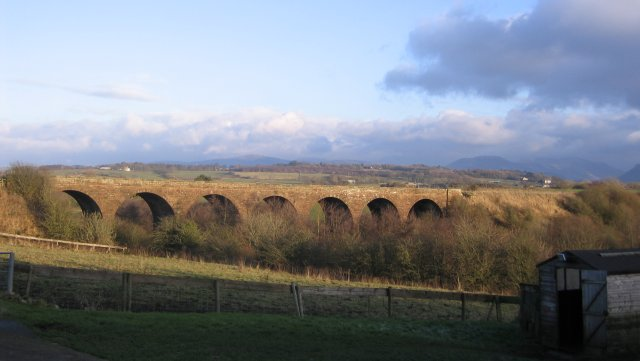
- Keekle Viaduct in 2005
- Coordinates: 54°31′57.0″N 3°32′22″W
- Carries: Ex-Cleator and Workington Junction Railway
- Crosses: River Keekle
- Locale: Keekle Terrace, Cumbria, England

Characteristics
- Design: 7 stone arches
- Width: Twin Standard Gauge Rail

History
- Opened: 1 October 1879
- Closed: 16 September 1963

Location
- Interactive map of Keekle Viaduct

Keekle Viaduct is a former railway viaduct near Keekle, Cumbria, England.

== Context ==
The viaduct is a substantial structure which carried the double-track C&WJR's Cleator Moor West to Siddick Junction via Workington Central main line over the River Keekle.

It is situated between the former stations of Cleator Moor West and Keekle Colliers' Platform.

Opened in 1879, it consists of seven equal stone arches across the river.

Timetabled passenger services over the viaduct ended on 13 April 1931. Goods and mineral trains, with very occasional passenger excursions and diversions continued to use the line until it closed completely on 16 September 1963.

The tracks were subsequently lifted. The structure was offered for sale for £1 in 1992, but there was no initial response, as any purchaser would have to maintain and repair it, rather than demolish it and recover the stone.

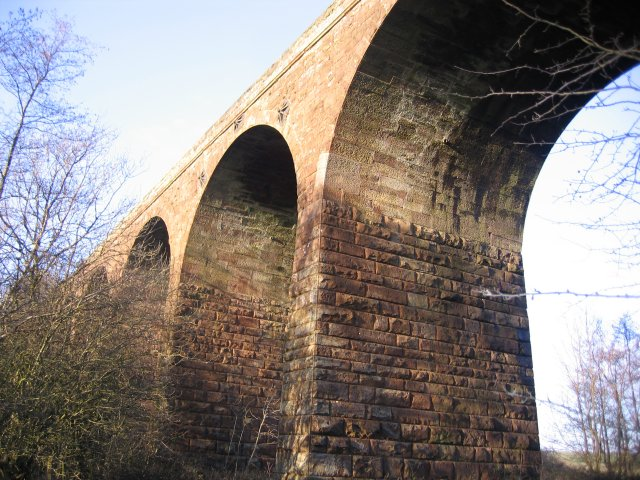
Looking up at Keekle Viaduct

== Modern times ==
In 2013 satellite imagery showed that the viaduct still stood. As of March 2026 the viaduct is still extant (personal visit). Access to the viaduct is blocked by metal fences at either end.

== Sources ==
- Anderson, Paul (April 2002). Hawkins, Chris (ed.). "Dog in the Manger? The Track of the Ironmasters". British Railways Illustrated. 11 (7). Clophill: Irwell Press Ltd.
- Joy, David (1973). Railways of the Lake Counties. Clapham, via Lancaster: Dalesman Publishing. ISBN 0-85206-200-1.
- McGowan Gradon, W. (2004) [1952]. The Track of the Ironmasters: A History of the Cleator and Workington Junction Railway. Grange-over-Sands: Cumbrian Railways Association. ISBN 0-9540232-2-6.
- Marshall, John (1981). Forgotten Railways: North West England. Newton Abbot: David & Charles. ISBN 0-7153-8003-6.
- Peascod, Michael, ed. (August 1992). "Not even for £1". Cumbrian Railways. 4 (16). Pinner: Cumbrian Railways Association. ISSN 1466-6812.
