= Eskett railway station =

Disused railway station in Cumbria, England

Eskett

General information
- Location: Eskett, Cumberland; England
- Coordinates: 54.5332°N 3.4732°W
- Grid reference: NY047163
- Platforms: 1

Other information
- Status: Disused

History
- Original company: Whitehaven, Cleator and Egremont Railway
- Pre-grouping: LNWR & FR Joint Railway
- Post-grouping: London, Midland and Scottish Railway

Key dates
- 12 February 1864: Opened
- 11 June 1872: Closed to passengers, replaced by Yeathouse
- 1931: Closed
Location

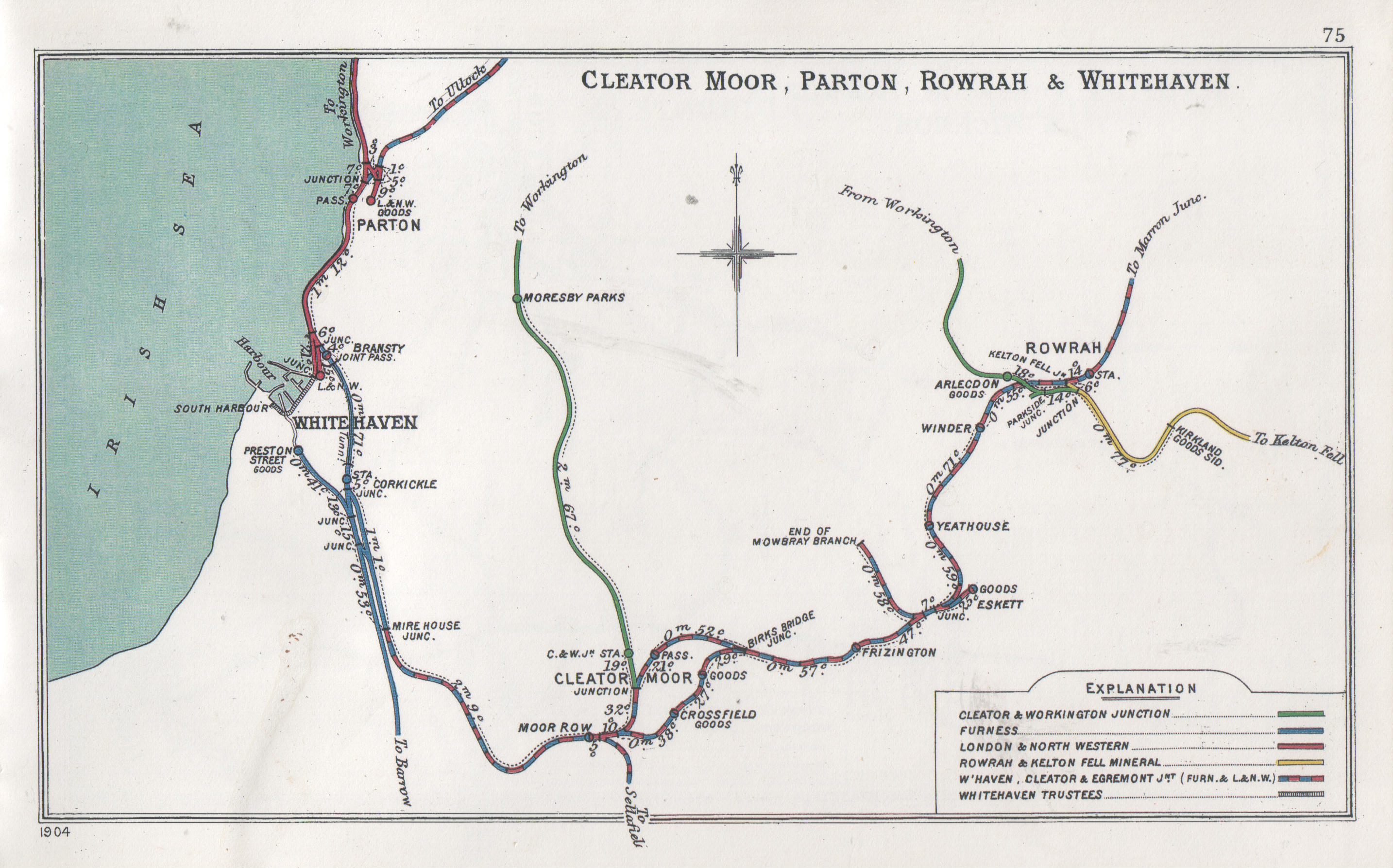
1904 railway junctions around Cleator Moor, Parton, Rowrah & Whitehaven

Eskett railway station was short-lived as a passenger station. it was built by the Whitehaven, Cleator and Egremont Railway to serve the hamlet of Eskett, near Frizington, Cumbria, England.

== History ==
The line was one of the fruits of the rapid industrialisation of West Cumberland in the second half of the nineteenth century.

The station opened to passengers with the line from Moor Row to Rowrah on 12 February 1864.

The section of line through the station suffered subsidence problems so severe that the company built a deviation line to an alignment curving sharply and steeply to the west, including a new passenger station - Yeathouse. When the deviation and new station opened on 11 June 1872 the old alignment was severed north of Eskett station, which was converted to a goods depot. It remained as such until final closure in 1931.

The deviation made the line even more difficult to work for the rest of its existence.

Preceding station	Disused railways	Following station
Winder; Line and station closed	Whitehaven, Cleator and Egremont Railway	Frizington; Line and station closed

== See also ==
- Furness Railway
- Cleator and Workington Junction Railway
