= Cleator Moor =

Town and civil parish in Cumbria, England

Coordinates: 54.5211°N 3.5119°W

- Town and parish
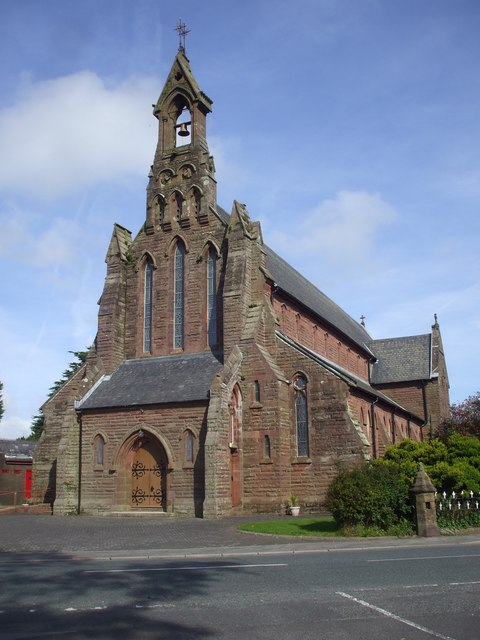
- St Mary's Catholic Church

- Location within Cumbria
- Population: 6,686 (Parish, 2021)
- OS grid reference: NY021150
- Civil parish: Cleator Moor
- Unitary authority: Cumberland
- Ceremonial county: Cumbria
- Region: North West
- Country: England
- Sovereign state: United Kingdom
- Post town: CLEATOR MOOR
- Postcode district: CA25
- Dialling code: 01946
- Police: Cumbria
- Fire: Cumbria
- Ambulance: North West
- UK Parliament: Whitehaven and Workington

Cleator Moor /ˈkliːtər ˈmʊər/ is a town and civil parish in the Cumberland district of Cumbria, England. The parish was historically called Cleator. During the Industrial Revolution in the 19th century, the new settlement of Cleator Moor was built on the moorland to the north of Cleator village, based around mining and the iron industry. There was a significant influx of Irish immigrants in the latter half of the 19th century, leading to the colloquial title of Little Ireland. Cleator Moor grew to become the main settlement in the parish, which was formally renamed Cleator Moor in 1934. Cleator village remains part of the parish, and is now classed as part of the built up area of Cleator Moor by the Office for National Statistics.

The town stands below Dent Fell, and is on the 190 miles (310 km) Coast to Coast Walk that spans Northern England.

== History ==
The name Cleator derives from the Old English word clāte meaning 'burdock' and the Old Norse erg meaning 'shieling'.

The town grew up to serve the iron works industry. The town had several iron ore mines and excessive mining caused subsidence. Some parts of the town have been demolished due to undermining in the area, most notably the whole of Montreal Street including the original Montreal Primary School.

The iron works was served by two railways. The Whitehaven, Cleator and Egremont Railway (WC&ER) was the first, opening for goods traffic in 1855, then two years later for passenger traffic. The WC&ER sold out to the London and North Western Railway in 1878 but when the Furness Railway objected to the sale it too became a partner, thus forming the Furness & London and North Western Joint Railway the following year. The second railway to serve Cleator Moor was the Cleator & Workington Junction Railway. This new company had a station on the western edge of the town and its double track main line made a junction with the former company at Cleator Moor West. The Whitehaven, Cleator and Egremont Railway suffered from subsidence which forced it to build two deviation branch lines and stations. In Cleator Moor itself a new line was built curving further northwest than the original, with a new station being opened in 1866 some 600 yards further west along Leconfield Street than the original, which became a goods station. The new station was known simply as Cleator Moor, but was renamed Cleator Moor East in 1924. Subsidence also necessitated a deviation at Eskett. As in Cleator Moor itself, a new line was built to the west of the original Eskett station which was retained as a goods station up to 1931. Yeathouse station was opened on the deviation line as a replacement.

The influx of Irish workers gave the town the nickname Little Ireland. As well as the settled Irish community, World War I and World War II saw an influx of immigrants from mainland Europe. In 1938, Jakob Spreiregen founded the company Kangol in Cleator, situated across the road from St Mary's Church. The original factory building still stands but is empty, since the company ended its association with the town in 2009. With the decline of traditional industries and the resulting high rate of unemployment, the town's economy is now dependent on the nearby Sellafield complex, which provides jobs to around half the town's people.

=== Sectarian troubles in the 19th century ===
It may be that the Irish Famine prompted some increased migration to the town, but links between West Cumbria and the northern counties of Ireland had been established before that time. Labourers crossed to work the harvest and, more permanently, to take jobs in the mines and ports long before the Famine. They were often prompted by the constant sub-division in Ireland of farmland among children. From the 1850s to the 1880s, the population expanded rapidly as rich veins of haematite (iron ore) were exploited. From a settlement of 763 in 1841, Cleator Moor grew to house 10,420 people by 1871, of whom 36% were Irish. As Donald MacRaild writes, "...formative economic developments, urban growth and the mass arrival of the Irish, took place entirely in years beyond the Famine." The Irish in Cleator Moor were predominantly Roman Catholic, but the general influx into the mines and industry of West Cumbria also brought Protestants from Ireland and with them a particular sectarianism to add to the anti-Catholicism of Victorian England.

During the late 1860s the Irish Protestant preacher William Murphy led anti-Catholic meetings throughout the country, inciting people to form mobs to attack Catholic targets. Near Chelmsford in Essex, they burnt down a Catholic convent. In May 1868, two chapels, a school, and over 100 houses and shops in Ashton-under-Lyme were ransacked. This led to the Catholic populations defending themselves and their buildings. When Murphy visited Whitehaven in April 1871, the Catholic iron ore miners of Cleator Moor were determined to confront him. The local authorities requested Murphy and his Orange Order backers to cancel his talks but they would not. He was heckled and threatened at the first meeting in the Oddfellows Hall, Whitehaven and eventually had to be escorted from the place. The following evening there was more concerted opposition as 200–300 Cleator Moor miners marched to the Hall and assaulted Murphy before the meeting began. Five men were sentenced for the attack. Murphy died in March 1872 and his death was attributed to the injuries he had received in Whitehaven.

Disturbances in the area were frequent during the years that followed, particularly when Orangemen assembled on 12 July. On that date in 1884, the most serious of them occurred. That was the year the local Orange Lodges decided to hold their annual gathering at Cleator Moor, a deliberately provocative move: "as if to court disturbance the Orangemen... decided they would this year hold their annual demonstration in the stronghold of the enemy" The marchers including eight bands paraded past the Catholic church and held their assembly at Wath Brow. As the gathering broke up and the Orangemen made their way back to the railway station, trouble broke out. They were attacked by groups of local men throwing stones and then rushing them. Some of the marchers carried revolvers, cutlasses and pikes which they now used to defend themselves. A local postal messenger, Henry Tumelty, a 17-year-old Catholic, was shot in the head and killed while other locals were listed as having received injuries. The local Catholic priests defended their parishioners, saying they had been provoked beyond measure by the foul sectarian tunes and the weaponry. Fr. Wray expressed serious regret: "It has thrown us back at least twenty years."

== Governance ==
There are two tiers of local government covering Cleator Moor, at parish (town) and unitary authority level: Cleator Moor Town Council and Cumberland Council. The town council is based in the Market Square at the former Free Library building (completed 1894).

Cleator Moor is within the Whitehaven and Workington constituency. Josh MacAlister is the Member of Parliament.

=== Administrative history ===
Cleator was an ancient parish in the historic county of Cumberland. By the mid-19th century, there was acknowledged to be a need for more modern forms of local government to manage the rapid growth of the area, particularly in light of the development of Cleator Moor as effectively a new town on the former moorland. An attempt to establish a local government district covering the whole parish of Cleator was rejected at a public meeting in May 1864, but later that year a smaller Cleator Moor local government district covering just part of the parish was created.

The Cleator Moor local government district was subsequently enlarged to cover the whole parish of Cleator in 1880. Although the district then covered the same area as the parish, the parish kept the name Cleator whereas the district was called Cleator Moor. Such districts were reconstituted as urban districts under the Local Government Act 1894.

Cleator Moor Urban District was abolished in 1934. Instead, the parish of Cleator was renamed Cleator Moor, reclassified as a rural parish and given a parish council, and it was included in the Ennerdale Rural District. Ennerdale Rural District was abolished in 1974, becoming part of the Borough of Copeland in the new county of Cumbria. Copeland was in turn abolished in 2023 when the new Cumberland Council was created, also taking over the functions of the abolished Cumbria County Council in the area.

== Demography ==
At the 2021 census, the parish had a population of 6,686. The built up area as defined by the Office for National Statistics (which, like the parish, also includes Cleator village) had a population of 6,670. At the 2011 census, the parish had a population of 6,936.

== St Mary's Church ==
The E.W. Pugin designed Catholic church of St Mary's was consecrated in 1872, replacing the earlier mission church built in 1853. The grounds are home to a meditative walk on the Stations of the Cross and Our Lady's Grotto, a replica of the Grotto at Lourdes, France.

== Transport ==
From 1879 Cleator Moor had two railway stations: Cleator Moor East on the Whitehaven, Cleator and Egremont Railway, and Cleator Moor West on the Cleator and Workington Junction Railway. In 1923 both railway companies and their stations passed over to the London Midland and Scottish Railway (LMS). The LMS had acquired shares in the local bus company so, to make public transport more profitable the LMS closed both stations to passengers in 1931. The goods facilities at Cleator Moor continued into the 1950s.

Cleator Moor now only has one bus service number 30 that passes through the town.

== Education ==
Cleator Moor has a Carnegie library, a grade II listed building which opened in 1906.

The town had two secondary schools but both have closed. St Cuthbert's stopped functioning in 1977 and in August 2008, after being open for 50 years, the town's other secondary school, Ehenside School was merged with Wyndham School in Egremont, making way for the West Lakes Academy. The academy initially used the Wyndham School buildings until a new academy building was constructed.

== Media ==
Local news and television programmes are provided by BBC North East and Cumbria and ITV Border. Television signals are received from the Caldbeck TV transmitter, and the local relay transmitter situated in Whitehaven.

The local radio stations are BBC Radio Cumbria and Greatest Hits Radio Cumbria & South West Scotland.

The town is served by a local newspaper, The Whitehaven News.

== Sport ==
Wath Brow Hornets are based in the town and play in the National Conference League, the top tier of amateur rugby league. The club won the GMB Union National Cup in 2004 and 2005, and the National Conference League in 2012.

Football team Cleator Moor Celtic F.C. has won the Cumberland Senior Cup seven times, most recently in 2018. England and former Manchester City goalkeeper Scott Carson began his career at Cleator Moor. The club has supplied players to Blackpool, Bolton Wanderers, Carlisle United, Ipswich Town, Liverpool, Sheffield Wednesday, and West Bromwich Albion.

== Notable people ==
- Artist L. S. Lowry regularly visited Cleator Moor and Cleator during the 1950s and painted local scenes including the Westminster Bank.
- Andrew Belton, the military adventurer, was born in Cleator Moor in 1882.
- Scott Carson, goalkeeper for Manchester City.
- Joe Kennedy, footballer for West Bromwich Albion (1925–1986)

== See also ==
- Listed buildings in Cleator Moor
