= Moor Row railway station =

Disused railway station in Cumbria, England

Moor Row
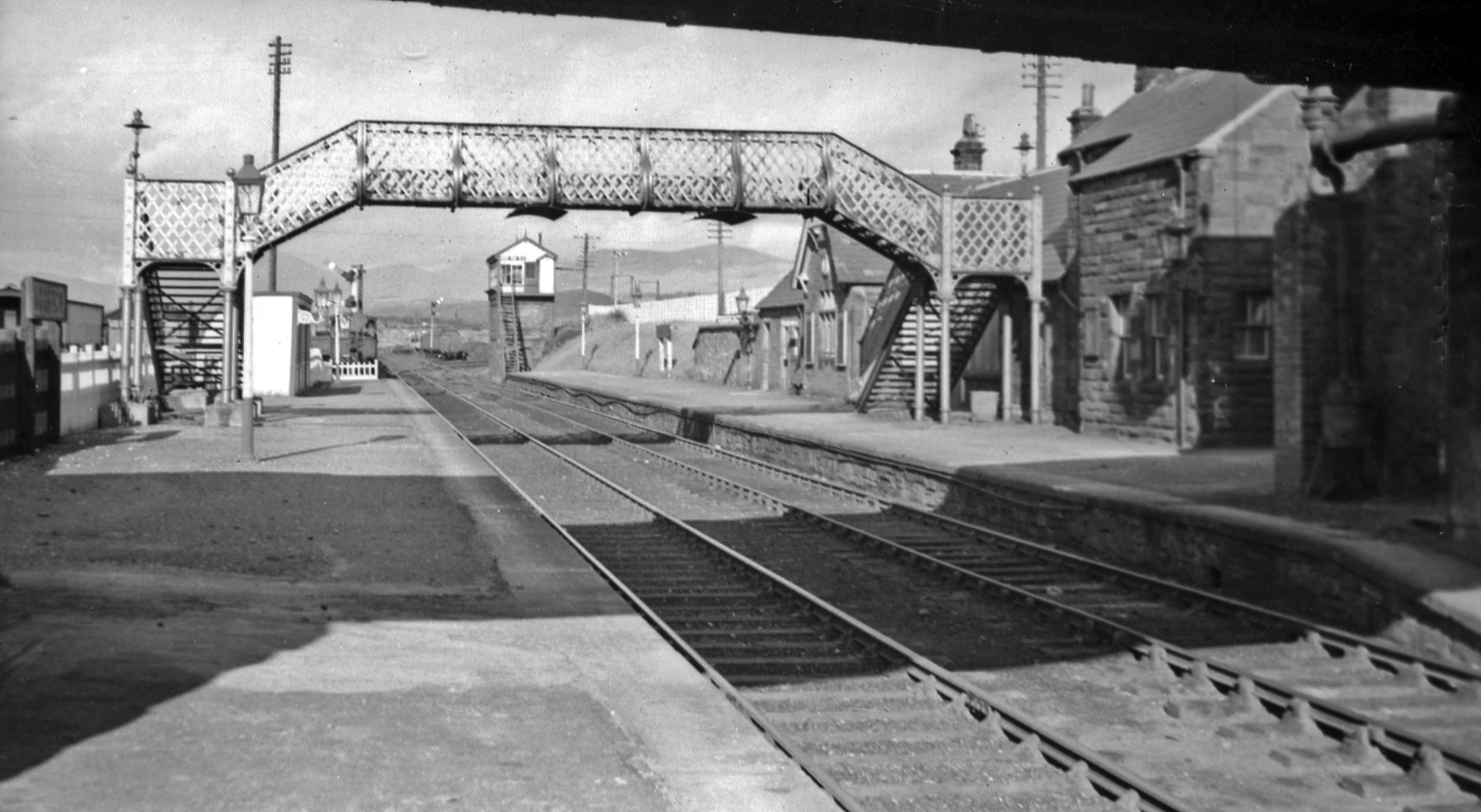
- Moor Row station 1952

General information
- Location: Moor Row, Cumberland; England
- Coordinates: 54.5166°N 3.5387°W
- Grid reference: NY004145
- Platforms: 2

Other information
- Status: Disused

History
- Original company: Whitehaven, Cleator and Egremont Railway
- Pre-grouping: LNWR & FR Joint Railway
- Post-grouping: London, Midland and Scottish Railway

Key dates
- 1 July 1857: Opened
- 7 January 1935: Closed
- 11 March 1940: Reopened to workmen's trains
- 8 April 1940: Closed
- 6 May 1946: Reopened
- 16 June 1947: Closed
- 23 May 1949: Reopened for workmen's trains to Sellafield.
- 6 September 1965: Closed
Location
- Location within the former Borough of Copeland Location within Cumbria

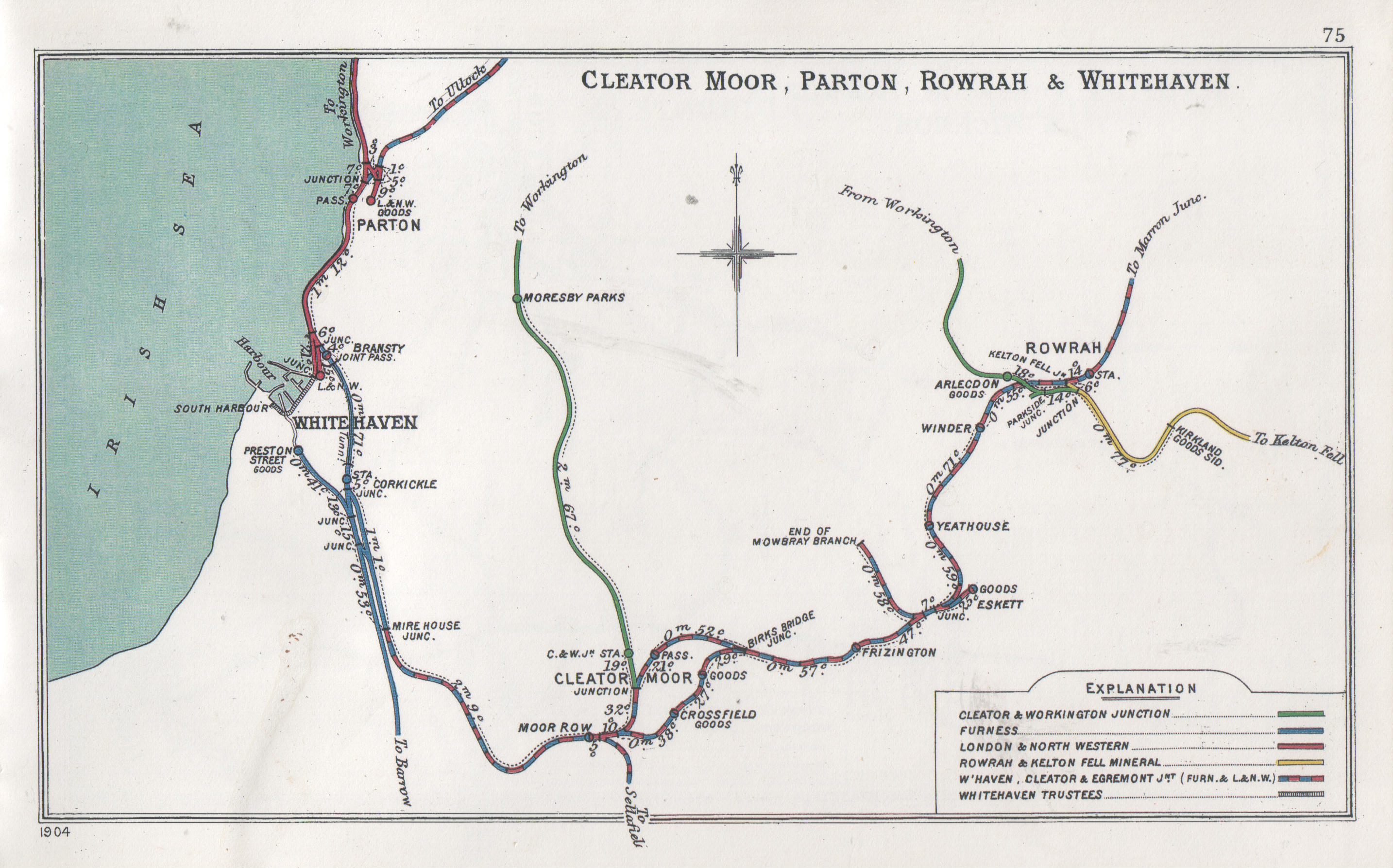
1904 railway junctions around Cleator Moor, Parton, Rowrah & Whitehaven

Moor Row railway station was built by the Whitehaven, Cleator and Egremont Railway. It served the village of Moor Row, Cumbria, England.

== History ==
Moor Row became the Crewe of the Iron Moor. The station was valuable to villagers and workmen and as a place to change trains, but Moor Row's greater railway role was to be the hub of what rapidly became a dense network of primarily industrial lines tapping reserves of stone, coal and, above all, iron ore in what had largely been a thinly populated area with generally modest agricultural potential.

The station opened to passengers on 1 July 1857 as the first stage of the network being developed from Whitehaven through Moor Row where it split, with one branch heading north east to Frizington and the other heading south to Egremont. The route towards Frizington suffered subsidence problems, which were resolved by building two deviations. One was in the Eskett area, the other directly affected Moor Row, with the original line to Cleator Moor being downgraded to goods only when a wholly new line was opened in 1866, turning sharply north just beyond the engine shed, within sight of the eastern end of the station platforms. A new passenger station was opened on the deviation - known locally as "The Bowthorn Line" - which was initially called plain Cleator Moor, but went on to be known as Cleator Moor East. The original and deviation lines parted east of Moor Row station and rejoined at Birks Bridge Junction north east of Cleator Moor village.

Over the next fifteen years both branches were extended: the northeasterly one beyond Frizington to Marron Junction and the southerly one beyond Egremont to Sellafield. At those end points both lines joined other lines with national connections. In traffic terms, even more important than reach was the striking number of quarries, mines and ironworks these lines spawned and tapped.

In July 1879 mineral traffic started on the Cleator and Workington Junction Railway, with a passenger service commencing on 1 October. This line headed north, leaving the Bowthorn Line at Cleator Moor Junction, 49 chains (0.99 km) from Moor Row station. It constituted the third and final route from Moor Row.

Trains were worked by a mixture of Furness Railway and LNWR locomotives.

An engine shed and sidings flanked the station, with the junctions for the branches starting at the eastern end of the platforms.

== Services ==
By a long measure the dominant traffic and revenue earner through Moor Row was minerals, especially iron ore.

General goods traffic before the rise of road transport was substantial, the line to Marron Junction, for example, justified two trains per day, despite its remote, rural nature.

Passenger traffic and revenue were problematic. Most workers walked to work, workmen's trains were provided where shift working at remote sites took place, this moved numbers of people but earned little. Discretionary travel was slight, market day extras ran in many areas, Moor Row included, but the economics of a one-day per week 3rd Class extra was marginal at best.

Moor Row's passenger services in 1922 consisted of:

- nine trains to Whitehaven, of which
  - three had come the long way round from Workington Main via Marron Junction and Rowrah
    - one with connections from Egremont and Workington Central
    - one with a connection from Workington Central
  - four had come from Rowrah, three with a connection from Sellafield or Egremont
  - two had come from Sellafield
    - one with a connection from Workington Central
- a Saturdays Only Egremont to Whitehaven
- three arrivals terminated at Moor Row with no onward connection
  - one from Sellafield on a Saturday evening
  - three from Workington Central (one of which arrived two minutes after a Whitehaven departure)
- other arrivals followed a similar pattern to departures
- there was no Sunday service

A three times a day unadvertised workmen's service from Moor Row to Beckermet Mines began on 15 January 1912, calling at Woodend, Egremont and St Thomas Cross Platform. It is not yet clear when this came to an end or if other workmen's services were provided.

An enthusiasts' special called on 5 September 1954.

== Run down and closures ==
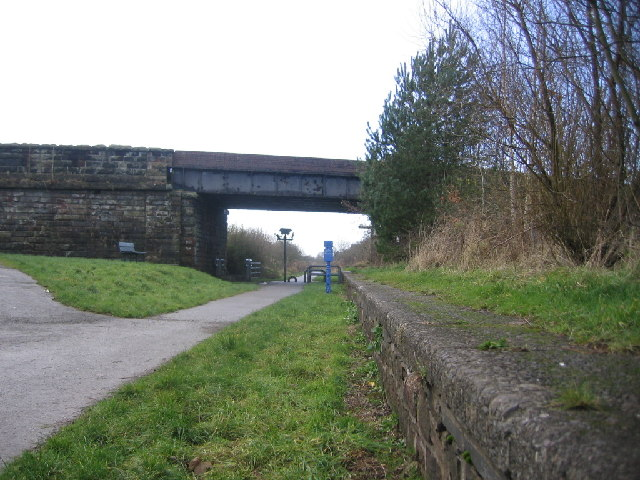
Remains of platform at side of cycle track in 2005

The services to Workington Central and Rowrah and beyond were withdrawn on 13 April 1931, leaving the Sellafield-Egremont-Whitehaven route as Moor Row's sole remaining public passenger service; it was withdrawn on 7 January 1935.

Life flickered briefly in Spring 1940 when workmen's trains were reinstated to support a period of high activity building the Royal Ordnance Factory at Drigg, but that lasted less than a month.

A public Sellafield-Egremont-Moor Row-Whitehaven service was reinstated on 6 May 1946, only to be "suspended" on 16 June 1947, a victim of the post-war fuel crisis. Bradshaw still listed the service as Suspended in 1949. It was never reinstated. Special trains and workmen's trains to Sellafield for the Nuclear Plant commenced in 1949 and survived to get a mention in the Beeching Report. They ended on 6 September 1965 when Moor Row station closed to passengers for good.

Declining quantities of freight continued to pass through the station site. The line south of Beckermet Quarry was taken out of use in January 1970, removing the possibility of diversionary or other through traffic to Sellafield and beyond. The last train from Rowrah Quarry passed in February 1978. The final traffic was iron ore from Beckermet Mine. The mine closed on 3 October 1980, with the line from the site to Corkickle through Moor Row closing on 1 November 1980, laying unused until it was lifted in 1993.

== Afterlife ==
In 2013 satellite images suggested that the station site is Public Open Space. The site of the adjacent sidings and locoshed were flattened but empty. By 2008 the trackbed had been transformed into part of National Cycle Route 71.

Preceding station	Disused railways	Following station
Cleator Moor West; Line and station closed	Cleator and Workington Junction Railway	Terminus
Cleator Moor; 1857-66	Whitehaven, Cleator and Egremont Railway	Corkickle; Line closed, station open
Cleator Moor East; 1866-1931	Whitehaven, Cleator and Egremont Railway	Corkickle; Line closed, station open
Woodend; Line and station closed	Whitehaven, Cleator and Egremont Railway	Corkickle; Line closed, station open

== See also ==
- Furness Railway
- Cleator and Workington Junction Railway
