= St Leonard, Cleator =

Coordinates: 54.5068°N 3.5239°W

St Leonard
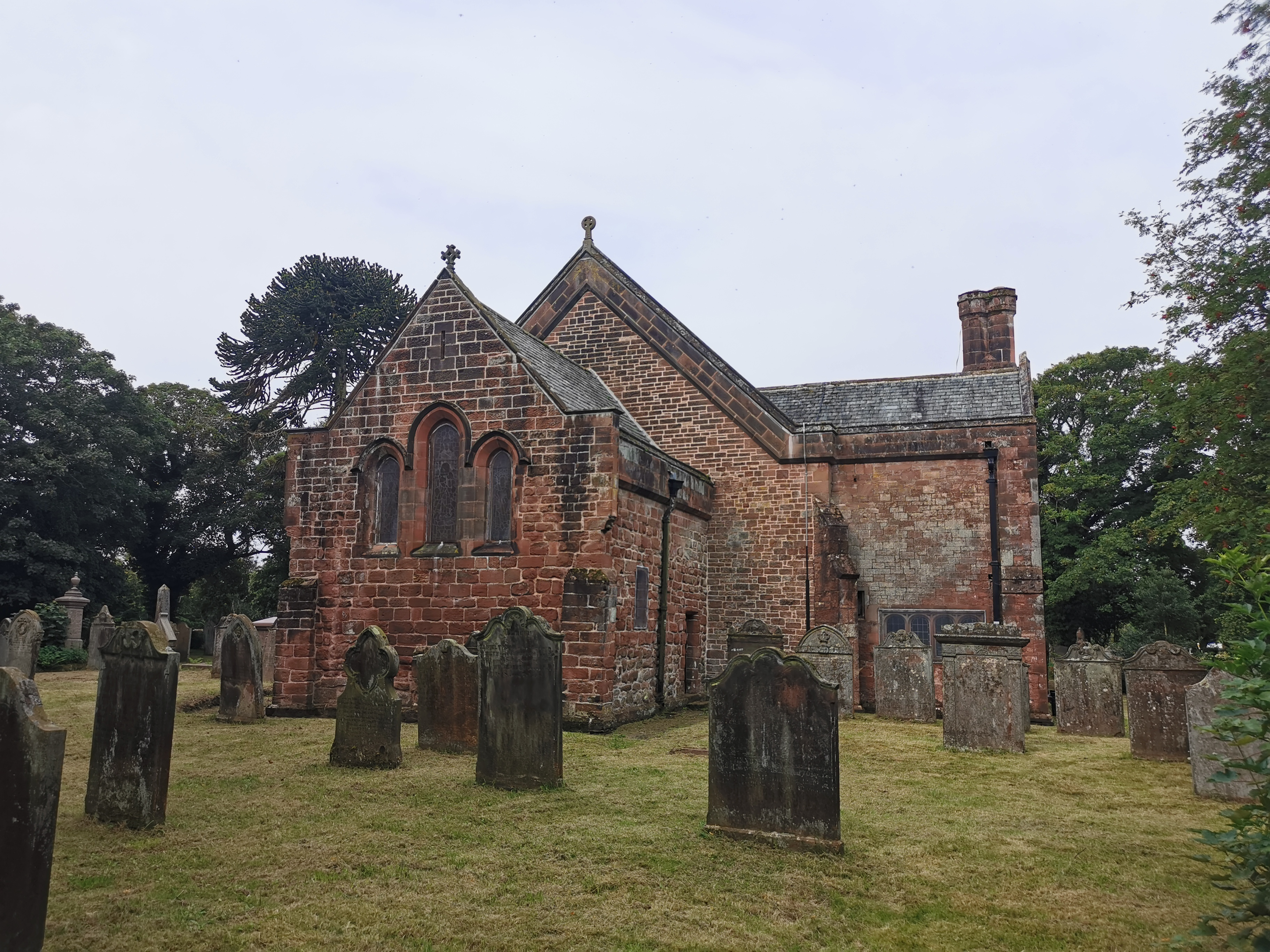
- St Leonard, Cleator

- Location in Copeland Borough Location in Cumbria
- OS grid reference: NY 0142113466
- Location: Cleator, Cumbria
- Country: England
- Denomination: Anglican
- Website: https://crosslacon.net/our-churches/st-leonards-cleator/

History
- Status: Parish church
- Dedication: St Leonard

Administration
- Province: York
- Diocese: Carlisle
- Archdeaconry: West Cumberland
- Deanery: Calder
- Parish: Cleator

Clergy
- Vicar: Revd N. Pennington

St Leonard is a church in Cleator, Cumbria, England. It is an active Anglican parish church in the deanery of Calder, and the diocese of Carlisle. Its benefice is Crosslacon. The church is a Grade II listed building.

== History ==
St Leonard's Church is first mentioned in the reign of King Henry I (1100 – 1135). The present chancel dates from that time but there is possibly even earlier evidence of a building phase (432) in the base of some walls. Below the ancient walls are the remains of earlier walls possibly pre Norman. It may be that these are the remains of the first church built in this Parish, erected by those who first evangelised these parts in Celtic days, possibly in the time of St Ninian (died 432), or St. Aidan (around 651). Richard of Cleator's brother, Nicholas, is recorded as ‘Nicholao persona’, and this has been interpreted as the first reference to the church at Cleator, ‘persona’ seemingly meaning ‘parson’. The rectory of the church at Cleator was held by Calder Abbey, founded 1134/5 as an offshoot of Furness Abbey. It is uncertain when the church at Cleator came into the possession of the monks of the abbey, as the chartulary for Calder Abbey no longer exists, but it was recorded at the Reformation as being in their possession. Restoration took place in the 15th century and again in 1792, 1841 and 1900.

== Architecture ==
The nave was rebuilt in 1841–42 by the architect George Webster. The western baptistry, the north porch and the vestry were all added in 1903 (the date is marked in the spandrels to the porch door) by J.H. Martindale (Carlisle). The chancel has sandstone blocks on a chamfered plinth with pilaster buttresses and blocking course; the rest is snecked rubble with stepped buttresses and castellated parapets. There are graduated slate roofs with apex crosses to the stone copings and a gabled bellcote to the west end, over the porch. There are corniced octagonal stone chimneys to the vestry on the north side. There is a nave with the western baptistry and the north porch and lower chancel. The windows to the chancel's side walls are original, with triple lancets to the east end that possibly date to the 19th century. All the other windows are early 20th-century and copy the 16th-century windows (traceried to the west end and the south side). There are 2 segment-headed arches opening on to the north porch; a vestry door to the east, a porch door (with inscription above) to the west, and a stone bench along the nave wall. The interior is characterised by a 4-bay nave with a hammer-beam roof. The chancel has foliate bosses to a wooden barrel vault. The 4-centred arches to the baptistry and chancel have Gothic panelling to the reveals. In the chancel there is a medieval piscina with Gothic-style wainscoting possibly from the 19th century. On the south side of the nave, there is a mural stair which leads to a polygonal pulpit carved in stone. As to the font, this is possibly from the 17th century, and it has a hexagonal bowl carried on a column mounted on an octagonal plinth. The seating in both the nave and the choir is from 1906. The stained glass windows are by Heaton, Butler & Bayne (London) and Abbott & Co. (London and Lancaster).

== Churchyard ==
The churchyard has approximately 200 grave stones including 2 Commonwealth War Graves from the First World War
