= Eskett =

Hamlet in Cumbria, England

Coordinates: 54.541°N 3.464°W

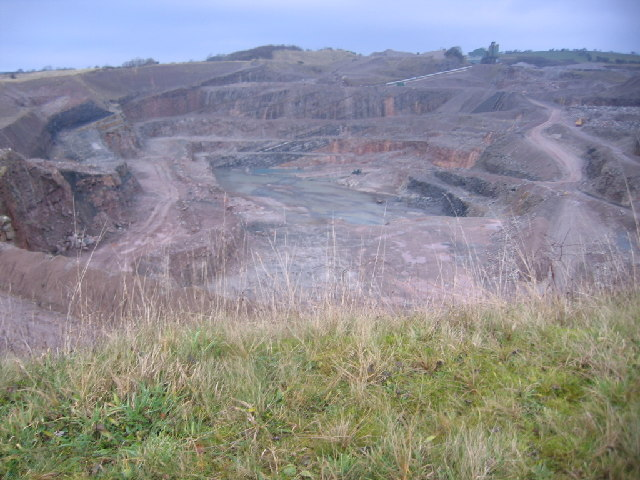
- Eskett Quarry

- Location in Copeland Borough Location within Cumbria
- OS grid reference: NY052171
- Civil parish: Lamplugh
- Unitary authority: Cumberland
- Ceremonial county: Cumbria
- Region: North West
- Country: England
- Sovereign state: United Kingdom
- Post town: FRIZINGTON
- Postcode district: CA26
- Dialling code: 01524
- Police: Cumbria
- Fire: Cumbria
- Ambulance: North West
- UK Parliament: Whitehaven and Workington

Eskett is a hamlet in Cumbria, England. Geologically it is known for its limestone formation.
