= CA postcode area =

Postcode area within the United Kingdom

Carlisle
- Postcode area
- Coordinates: 54.720°N 3.109°W
- Country: United Kingdom
- Postcode area: CA
- Postcode area name: Carlisle
- Post towns: 22
- Postcode districts: 30
- Postcode sectors: 83
- Postcodes (live): 12,642
- Postcodes (total): 16,214
- Statistics as at May 2020

The CA postcode area, also known as the Carlisle postcode area, is a group of 28 postcode districts in north-west England, within 22 post towns. These cover northern Cumbria, including Carlisle, Penrith, Workington, Whitehaven, Maryport, Cockermouth, Egremont, Alston, Appleby-in-Westmorland, Beckermet, Brampton, Cleator, Cleator Moor, Frizington, Holmrook, Keswick, Kirkby Stephen, Moor Row, Ravenglass, Seascale, St Bees and Wigton, plus a small part of Northumberland.

Mail for the CA postcode area is processed at Carlisle Mail Centre, along with mail for the DG postcode area.

== Coverage ==
The approximate coverage of the postcode districts:

Postcode district	Post town	Coverage	Local authority area(s)
CA1	CARLISLE	Carlisle (east)	Cumberland
CA2	CARLISLE	Carlisle (south and west)	Cumberland
CA3	CARLISLE	Carlisle (north)	Cumberland
CA4	CARLISLE	Warwick Bridge, Wetheral, Cumwhinton, Armathwaite	Cumberland, Westmorland and Furness
CA5	CARLISLE	Dalston, Burgh by Sands, Thursby	Cumberland
CA6	CARLISLE	Longtown, Penton, Blackford	Cumberland
CA7	WIGTON	Wigton, Silloth, Aspatria, Caldbeck, Hesket Newmarket	Cumberland, Westmorland and Furness
CA8	BRAMPTON	Brampton, Gilsland, Greenhead, Lambley, Slaggyford	Cumberland, Northumberland
CA9	ALSTON	Alston, Garrigill, Nenthead, Kirkhaugh	Westmorland and Furness, Northumberland
CA10	PENRITH	Penrith (Carleton Hall area), Shap, Tebay, Kirkby Thore, Langwathby, Lazonby, Pooley Bridge	Westmorland and Furness
CA11	PENRITH	Penrith (most of), Stainton, Mungrisdale, Glenridding, Patterdale	Westmorland and Furness
CA12	KESWICK	Keswick, Seatoller, Braithwaite, Bassenthwaite, Threlkeld	Cumberland, Westmorland and Furness
CA13	COCKERMOUTH	Cockermouth, Lorton, Buttermere	Cumberland
CA14	WORKINGTON	Workington, Distington, Stainburn, Seaton	Cumberland
CA15	MARYPORT	Maryport, Dearham, Flimby, Allonby	Cumberland
CA16	APPLEBY-IN-WESTMORLAND	Appleby-in-Westmorland	Westmorland and Furness
CA17	KIRKBY STEPHEN	Kirkby Stephen, Brough, Ravenstonedale	Westmorland and Furness
CA18	RAVENGLASS	Ravenglass	Cumberland
CA19	HOLMROOK	Holmrook, Santon Bridge, Eskdale	Cumberland
CA20	SEASCALE	Seascale, Sellafield, Gosforth, Wasdale Head	Cumberland
CA21	BECKERMET	Beckermet	Cumberland
CA22	EGREMONT	Egremont, Thornhill	Cumberland
CA23	CLEATOR	Cleator, Ennerdale Bridge	Cumberland
CA24	MOOR ROW	Moor Row	Cumberland
CA25	CLEATOR MOOR	Cleator Moor	Cumberland
CA26	FRIZINGTON	Frizington	Cumberland
CA27	ST. BEES	St Bees	Cumberland
CA28	WHITEHAVEN	Hensingham, Moresby, Parton, Sandwith, Whitehaven	Cumberland
CA95	WORKINGTON		non-geographic
CA99	CARLISLE	Jobcentre Plus	non-geographic

== Map ==
CA postcode area map, showing postcode districts in red and post towns in grey text, with links to nearby DG, DL, LA, NE and TD postcode areas.

== See also ==
- List of postcode areas in the United Kingdom
- Postcode Address File
