= River Keekle =

River in Cumbria, England

Coordinates: 54.5017°N 3.5276°W

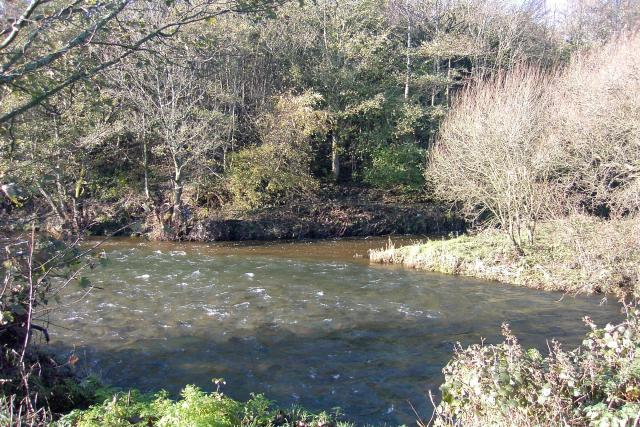
The River Keekle meets the River Ehen

The River Keekle is a river running through the English county of Cumbria.

The source of the Keekle is to be found at Keekle Head Farm on High Park between Gilgarran and Asby. From there, the river moves gradually southwards via former open cast mine between Frizington and Whitehaven, past the hamlet of Keekle, to Cleator, where it becomes subsumed by the River Ehen. The river is noted for its occasional abundance of salmon.

Oatlands Pit was sunk at Keekle Head in 1880 by The Moresby Coal Company which also built the pit terraces of Pica Village. The pit was sunk approx 500 yards south east of Pica. It was served by the Rowrah Branch of the Cleator to Workington railway. Production at Oatlands was suspended in 1930 with closure in 1932 and final abandonment in 1934.

In the 1980s, Oatlands became part of the extensive open cast coal mining operation working from Keekle Head. The River Keekle valley was an open cast coal mining site and the site was later used to bury mine spoil and other waste.

In 2010, there was lobbying against plans for dumping of low-level nuclear waste at the former open cast site at Keekle Head. In 2012, Cumbria County Council rejected proposals by Endecom (owned by recycling and waste management company Sita) to build a repository for low level and very low level radioactive waste on the site of the former coal mine at Keekle Head. The council said the plan would have an "unacceptable impact" on the surrounding landscape. Endecom appealed against the rejection, triggering a two-week-long public inquiry, held in Kendal. There was strong opposition to the proposal to put radioactive waste in the site of the former open cast mine from Radiation Free Lakeland and others. In 2013, a fresh inquiry was held.

In the 1990s, a 2.5 km stretch of the river was lined with plastic to protect it from potential mine water contamination and because of fears that possible future erosion could expose deeply buried mine waste underneath. Over the years, this plastic liner began to degrade and break up, with pieces being washed downstream, creating blockages, localised flooding and plastic pollution in the River Keekle, as well as posing a threat to the downstream River Ehen – a Site of Special Scientific Interest and a Special Area of Conservation. During 2019 and 2020, the West Cumbria Rivers Trust carried out a £1.5 million project to remove the plastic liner and restore the riverbed with funding from the European Agricultural Fund for Rural Development's Water Environment Grant and the Environment Agency's River Restoration Programme. Around 150 tonnes of plastic was removed, with the sheets shredded, cleaned and recycled. Some of the plastic has been made into a bench and picnic table at Walkmill Community Woodland car park to mark the project's success. The river is re-naturalising itself and evidence of natural gravel, cobbles and sediment deposition can now be seen. The stretch of river has the potential to become a great habitat for people and wildlife.
