= Moor Row =

Village in Cumbria, England

Coordinates: 54.514°N 3.538°W

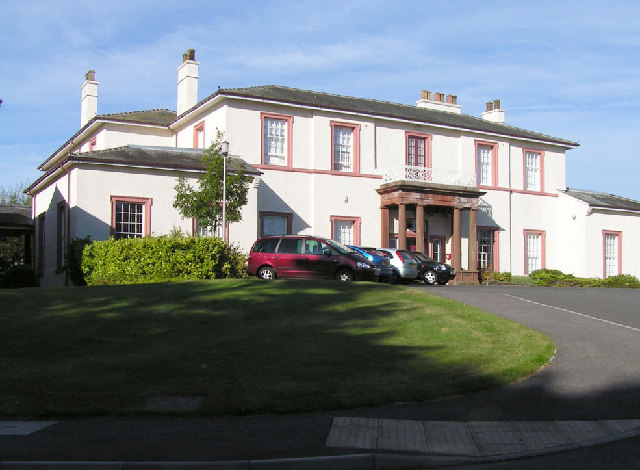
- Ingwell Hall, on the outskirt of Moor Row

- Location in Copeland Borough Location within Cumbria
- Area: 0.210 km^{2} (0.081 sq mi)
- Population: 759 (2018 estimate)
  - Density: 3,614/km^{2} (9,360/sq mi)
- OS grid reference: NY004142
- Civil parish: Egremont
- Unitary authority: Cumberland
- Ceremonial county: Cumbria
- Region: North West
- Country: England
- Sovereign state: United Kingdom
- Post town: MOOR ROW
- Postcode district: CA24
- Dialling code: 01946
- Police: Cumbria
- Fire: Cumbria
- Ambulance: North West
- UK Parliament: Whitehaven and Workington

Moor Row is a village in Cumbria, North West England. It is in Egremont civil parish and lies on a minor road off the A595, south-east of Whitehaven. In 2018 it had an estimated population of 759.

== History ==
Moor Row is a residential community on Cumbria's coastal plain. Government records, notably in census reports, record its name as Low Keekle, Ingwell View, Moor Row Junction, Moorroe, and Scalegill. The history of Moor Row goes back to before 1762 when the area between Summerhill Mansion and Woodend with Cleator was populated with residents of the Low Moor Row and High Moor Row homesteads. The Wildridge family lived at the Low Moor Row home stead on what became known as Church St. The Wildridge daughter Elizabeth married the local gardener called Dalzell who took over his new wife's estates when the Wildridges died. The village of Moor Row was built originally to house railway workers on the newly built Whitehaven Cleator and Egremont Railway, at the junction from Whitehaven south to Egremont and East to Cleator and the Frizington iron mines. The railway opened in 1855, and the first workers cottages had been built on the east side of what became Dalzell Street by 1860. The 19th century discovery of iron ore in the vicinity brought many to work in the nascent iron and steel industry in West Cumbria, including from Ireland, Scotland, the Isle of Man, Italy, and England. The 'row of houses on a moor' expanded as the employers needed more workers to keep their businesses going. Cornish tin miners were amongst those that moved here to work the mines, whose presence is noted by the name Penzance Street. Another street, Dalzell, is named after the Dalzell family who owned parcels of land along the road from Moor Row to Woodend past Gutterby and around Frizington and Aspatria. By 1885 the Dalzell estates were being run by the trustees of the family.

== Houses ==
The village name probably refers to the Scalegill street houses, which are noted on an 1860 Ordnance Survey map. The 1859 homes on Dalzell Street are thought to be the oldest of the terraced rows. The village has grown in the 20th century, adding modern suburban homes to the mixture and is continuing to do so in the 21st century. The growth of suburbia forms the corollary of the destruction of local amenities and facilities; only the school and a working men's institute survive from the many shops, coal merchants, takeaways, car dealerships, bus services and train services that once meant residents felt little need to leave the village except for luxury items. The other small businesses of builders, insurance agencies, joiners, decorators, smiths, dress makers, confectioners and bakers, have almost completely disappeared too. The local chapels have been converted in to houses and a car work shop, while the former Working Men's Institute building that has stood for 120 years is now a chapel with a war memorial mural painted on its gable. In the brave new green world of climate change mitigation there is no public transport, no local shops, and no local health care provision, and very few street lamps for pedestrian safety. The Sellafield traffic that uses the roads through the village as commuter rat runs exceeds the volume that uses the main road at Calder bridge, at speeds greatly in excess of the speed limits. There are no pedestrian crossings in the village.

== Mines ==
Moor Row's Montreal Mines produced 250,000 tons a year, the largest of any mine in the Whitehaven or Furness district except for the one at Hodbarrow. The mine property covered 1,000 acres (4.0 km^{2}), half of which was ore bearing. Both open pit and shaft mining took place. Between 1000 and 1200 people were employed locally in the industry. There were six active shafts lifting ore within Moor Row, whose workings spread around the village. One shaft is in the centre of a new suburban development in Montreal Place. The last mine was closed in the 1920s, leaving most of the workings drowned and the surrounding land flooded with cankered mine water. A number of mine shaft caps have sunk or collapsed in the last twenty years. The old railway yard is listed on the coal authority risk register as not suitable for housing development at its eastern end near the Keekle River because of under mining.

== Railway ==
Moor Row formerly had a station on the Whitehaven, Cleator and Egremont Junction Railway. There was a junction at Moor Row to Cleator Moor east to avoid mine subsidence at the original Cleator Moor station. A second branch ran to Egremont and on to Sellafield, which was marked by mine subsidence. A sub branch from Egremont served the Bigrigg mines. A railway shunting yard was built in the village, bringing further jobs and prosperity to the inhabitants along with an engine shed and carriage and wagon repair facilities.. It became western Cumbria's most important junction and goods yard until the end of World War II when trucks and the motorways brought about the decline of the railways in the UK. The railway closed in 1980 with the closing of the last mine at Beckermet. The railway bed is still in situ and runs to Mirehouse Junction and Rowrah. It is also now part of both the national coast to coast walk and cycleway.

== Employment ==
Westlakes Science and Technology Park is a local employer today. Also the nuclear power plant Sellafield is a few miles away which also offers local employment. The area has lost practically all the industries induced to the area in post WW2 government schemes managed through various development agencies. Those agencies' functions have largely been replaced by Britain's Energy Coast land agency owned by the government's Nuclear Decommissioning Authority that replaced BNFL as the owner operators of the Sellafield and Windscale plutonium factory. In 2022 the site started a 100-year clean up programme expected to cost over £100 billion at 2022 prices.

== Sport ==
The village has a football team, Moor Row F.C.
