= Rowrah railway station =

Disused railway station in Cumbria, England

Rowrah

General information
- Location: Rowrah, Cumberland; England
- Coordinates: 54.5536°N 3.4554°W
- Grid reference: NY059185
- Platforms: 2

Other information
- Status: Disused

History
- Original company: Whitehaven, Cleator and Egremont Railway
- Pre-grouping: LNWR & FR Joint Railway
- Post-grouping: London, Midland and Scottish Railway

Key dates
- 12 February 1864: Opened
- 13 April 1931: Closed to passengers
- 11 March 1940: Reopened to workmen's trains
- 8 April 1940: Closed to passengers
- 1967: Closed completely
Location

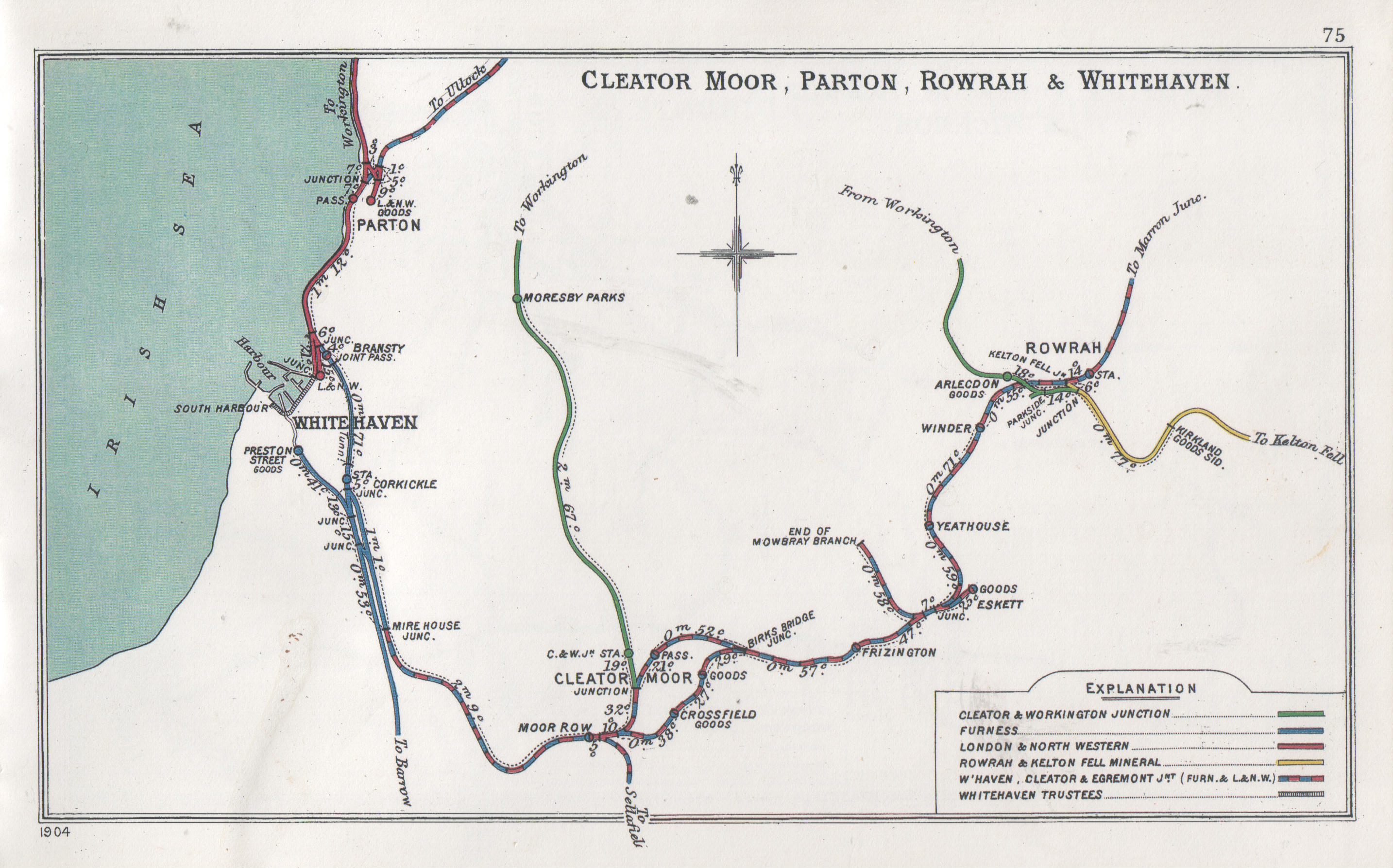
1904 railway junctions around Cleator Moor, Parton, Rowrah & Whitehaven

Rowrah railway station was built by the Whitehaven, Cleator and Egremont Railway. It served the village of Rowrah, Cumbria, England.

== Local lines ==
Rowrah was connected by three separate railway companies:

- The Whitehaven, Cleator and Egremont Railway curving southwest to north through the station.
- "Baird's Line" - a branch of the Cleator and Workington Junction Railway arriving at Rowrah from the northwest, and
- The Rowrah and Kelton Fell Railway which conveyed minerals from mines in the hills to the southeast.

Neither of the latter two ran directly through the station, but all were connected and complex interworking took place.

== Services ==
The Rowrah and Kelton Fell Railway was a mineral railway pure and simple. It never carried passengers or general goods.

Baird's Line was also a mineral line, though workmen's trains ran from Rowrah's "other" station at Arlecdon, which was on the north western edge of the village.

Rowrah Station's owning Whitehaven, Cleator and Egremont company was taken over by the LNWR and Furness Railway in 1879 as a Joint Line, whereafter the northern section through the station was usually worked by the LNWR. Passenger traffic northwards consisted of three trains a day in each direction, with an extra on Whitehaven market day and none on Sundays. Those few trains were supplemented southwards to Moor Row and Whitehaven, with a further four starting at Rowrah.

From opening, northbound passenger trains terminated at Marron Junction station where passengers changed for destinations beyond. In 1897 Marron Junction station closed, with trains running west through to Workington Main thereafter, a much better arrangement for most passengers. Passengers who would otherwise have changed at Marron Junction to head east to Brigham or beyond simply changed at the first stop after Marron Junction - Camerton.

In April 1910 six trains a day ran from Whitehaven to Rowrah via Moor Row, some continuing to Workington Main via Bridgefoot.

No Sunday passenger service ever ran over the line.

Goods traffic usually consisted of two daily turns Up and Down.

Mineral traffic was the dominant flow, typically six loaded and six empty through to Workington, though this was subject to considerable fluctuation with trade cycles. Stations and signalling along the line north of Rowrah were changed during the Joint regime to conform to LNWR standards.

== Rundown and closure ==
The Rowrah and Kelton Fell Railway closed in stages between 1920 and 1926. Its tracks were lifted in 1934. The Gilgarron Branch which ran westwards from Ullock Junction closed east of Distington with the ironworks there in the late 1920s. Baird's Line closed on 8 August 1938, with its limestone traffic to Workington being switched to the Rowrah to Marron Junction line. By 1954 this had been re-routed again, this time to run via Moor Row, rendering the line to Marron Junction redundant. This limestone traffic continued until 1978, long outlasting all other services to, from or through Rowrah.

The station closed on 13 April 1931 when normal passenger traffic ended along the line, though workmen's trains were reinstated in March 1940, only to be withdrawn a month later. Goods trains continued to call until 1954, but mineral traffic was down to the one limestone flow. An enthusiasts' special called on 5 September 1954. After scant occasional use the line northwards from Rowrah was abandoned in 1960 and subsequently lifted.

Such was the goods, ad hoc passenger traffic and special services that Rowrah continued to have a staffed station until 1967, 36 years after passenger services officially ceased.

Identified railway staff from Rowrah include:-

- George Stoddart was the last station master at Rowrah serving from 1947 to May 1967, leaving into retirement.
- Samuel Hastings, railway clerk, married Miss Mary Ann Yates both of Rowrah - 18th MARCH 1882

== Afterlife ==
In 2009 Rowrah Station was a private residence.

Preceding station	Disused railways	Following station
Lamplugh; Line and station closed	Whitehaven, Cleator and Egremont Railway	Winder; Line and station closed

== See also ==
- Cockermouth and Workington Railway
- Cockermouth, Keswick and Penrith Railway
- Furness Railway
- Anderson, Paul (April 2002). Hawkins, Chris (ed.). "Dog in the Manger? The Track of the Ironmasters". British Railways Illustrated. 11 (7). Clophill: Irwell Press Ltd. ISSN 0961-8244.
- Atterbury, Paul (2009). Along Lost Lines. Newton Abbot: David and Charles. ISBN 978-0-7153-2706-7.
- Bairstow, Martin (1995). Railways In The Lake District. Halifax: Martin Bairstow. ISBN 978-1-871944-11-2.
- Bradshaw, George (1985) [July 1922]. Bradshaw's General Railway and Steam Navigation guide for Great Britain and Ireland: A reprint of the July 1922 issue. Newton Abbot: David & Charles. ISBN 978-0-7153-8708-5. OCLC 12500436.
- Broughton, John; Harris, Nigel (1985). British Railways Past and Present: No. 1 Cumbria. Kettering: Silver Link Publishing Ltd. ISBN 978-0-947971-04-5.
- Butt, R. V. J. (October 1995). The Directory of Railway Stations: details every public and private passenger station, halt, platform and stopping place, past and present (1st ed.). Sparkford: Patrick Stephens Ltd. ISBN 978-1-85260-508-7. OCLC 60251199. OL 11956311M.
- Croughton, Godfrey; Kidner, R. W.; Young, Alan (1982). Private and Untimetabled Railway Stations, Halts and Stopping Places. The Oakwood Press. ISBN 978-0-85361-281-0. OCLC 10507501.
- Jowett, Alan (March 1989). Jowett's Railway Atlas of Great Britain and Ireland: From Pre-Grouping to the Present Day (1st ed.). Sparkford: Patrick Stephens Ltd. ISBN 978-1-85260-086-0. OCLC 22311137.
- McGowan Gradon, W. (2004) [1952]. The Track of the Ironmasters: A History of the Cleator and Workington Junction Railway. Grange-over-Sands: Cumbrian Railways Association. ISBN 978-0-9540232-2-5.
- Marshall, John (1981). Forgotten Railways: North West England. Newton Abbot: David and Charles. ISBN 978-0-7153-8003-1.
- Quayle, Howard (2007). Whitehaven: The Railways and Waggonways of a Unique Cumberland Port. Pinner: Cumbrian Railways Association. ISBN 978-0-9540232-5-6.
- Smith, Paul; Turner, Keith (2012). Railway Atlas Then and Now. Shepperton: Ian Allan Publishing. ISBN 978-0-7110-3695-6.
- Suggitt, Gordon (2008). Lost Railways of Cumbria (Railway Series). Newbury: Countryside Books. ISBN 978-1-84674-107-4.
- Webb, David R. (October 1964a). Cooke, B.W.C. (ed.). "Between the Solway and Sellafield: Part Two". The Railway Magazine. 110 (762). London: Tothill Press Limited. ISSN 0033-8923.
- Welbourn, Nigel (September 2010). Lost Lines: Joint Railways. Shepperton: Ian Allan Publishing. ISBN 978-0-7110-3428-0.
