= Whitehaven, Cleator and Egremont Railway =

Overview
- Status: Closed
- Owner: Whitehaven, Cleator and Egremont Railway
- Locale: Cumbria
- Termini: Whitehaven; Marron Junction Egremont
- Stations: 12

Service
- Type: Rural Line
- System: National Rail Network
- Services: 2
- Operator(s): Whitehaven, Cleator and Egremont Railway

History
- Opened: 1855
- Closed: 1964

Technical
- Track gauge: 4 ft 8 1/2 in (1,435 mm)

The Whitehaven, Cleator and Egremont Railway was an English railway company which built and operated a standard gauge railway in Cumberland, England intended to open up the hematite orefield to the south-east of Whitehaven. It opened for goods traffic in 1855 and for passenger traffic in 1857.

== History ==
=== Promotion and construction ===
A prospectus for the company promoting the railway was issued in December 1853. The line was to run for four and a half miles from a junction with the Whitehaven and Furness Junction Railway at Mirehouse, two miles south of Whitehaven to Egremont via Moor Row, and iron ore mines at Bigrigg and Woodend; a two-mile branch was to run from Moor Row to Frizington, (Note: Placenames in the orefield can be false friends, as the mining boom altered the pattern of settlement; often a name indicates an area, rather than the site of the current village: the 'Frizington branch' actually ran only to big haematite mines at Parkside - the Parkside Hotel was later built adjacent to the terminus.) serving an ironworks in Cleator Moor, and assorted ore mines in the district. The line was supported by the principal landowners (including the Earl of Lonsdale) and was predicted to be highly profitable. It was claimed that five to six hundred carts were employed to transport over a hundred thousand tons of ore a year raised in the area the railway would serve to Whitehaven; because of this traffic, the yearly rent of the tollgate at Hensingham had increased from £820 a year to £2,770 a year over the previous decade.

Whitehaven, Cleator, and Egremont Railway Act 1854
- Act of Parliament
- Parliament of the United Kingdom
- Long title: An Act for making a Railway from the Whitehaven and Furness Junction Railway, near Whitehaven, to Egremont, in the County of Cumberland, with a Branch therefrom to Frizington in the same County, to be called the Whitehaven, Cleator, and Egremont Railway; and for other Purposes.
- Citation: 17 & 18 Vict. c. lxiv

Dates
- Royal assent: 16 June 1854

Text of statute as originally enacted

The Whitehaven, Cleator, and Egremont Railway Act 1854 (17 & 18 Vict. c. lxiv) was obtained the following summer, and work promptly began on the Mirehouse-Frizington section; by December 1855 it was possible to run a trial train over this, particular attention being paid to the demonstration that trains could safely be stopped and started on the steep climb from Mirehouse to Moor Row. Opening for general mineral traffic followed in January 1856; the safety of the steep descent to Mirehouse being again insisted upon in a contemporary report: "This incline was descended at the rate of six miles per hour without the appliance of any break except to the engine. This is sufficient to set at rest any doubts which may have been entertained by any one respecting difficulty arising from the gradient on this section of the line." The Egremont branch was sufficiently complete by May 1856 that the directors were taken on an inspection tour of the entire line but a Board of Trade inspection of the line in August 1856 insisted on better siding accommodation at the Whitehaven and Furness Railway's Corkickle station and a more permanent arrangement with the W&FJR before passenger services could be authorised. The WC&ER contributed £2,000 towards the required work and the agreement with the W&FJR was extended to ten years. Formal opening ceremonies took place 16 July 1857, but passenger services had been running since the start of the month. In the last week of July 1858, about 6,400 tons of ore were transported by the WC&ER, three-quarters of this being shipped to Wales through Whitehaven harbour, despite its inadequate provision for the export of ore. An embankment failed at Woodend in October 1858, an adjoining viaduct was then condemned because of mining subsidence and (January–February 1859) services on the Egremont branch terminated at Woodend whilst the suspect section of viaduct was replaced by an embankment. The railway was so profitable that it was decided to pay the £500 cost of this out of current revenue, which still allowed an interim dividend of 4% for the first half of 1859. In 1862, Frizington branch services terminated at Cleator, again because of subsidence.

=== Expansion ===
Whitehaven, Cleator and Egremont Railway Act 1857
- Act of Parliament
- Parliament of the United Kingdom
- Long title: An Act to enable the Whitehaven, Cleator, and Egremont Railway Company to raise additional Capital; and for other Purposes.
- Citation: 20 Vict. c. iii

Dates
- Royal assent: 21 March 1857

Status: Current legislation

Whitehaven, Cleator and Egremont Railway Act 1861
- Act of Parliament
- Parliament of the United Kingdom
- Long title: An Act to enable the Whitehaven, Cleator, and Egremont Railway Company to extend their Railway from Frizington to Lamplugh in the County of Cumberland; to widen and enlarge their present Railway and Works; to raise further Capital; and for other Purposes.
- Citation: 24 & 25 Vict. c. lxii

Dates
- Royal assent: 7 June 1861

The powers and authorised capital obtained by the Whitehaven, Cleator, and Egremont Railway Act 1854 allowed only very limited operations, and further acts were obtained; the Whitehaven, Cleator and Egremont Railway Act 1857 (20 Vict. c. iii) increasing the capital (and hence authorised borrowing) of the company; the Whitehaven, Cleator and Egremont Railway Act 1861 (24 & 25 Vict. c. lxii) authorising the doubling of the line from Mirehouse to Frizington and (the shareholders having voted against its inclusion in the 1857 bill) a 'Lamplugh Extension' which did not run to the village of that name, but to Collier Yeat (near Rowrah) in Lamplugh parish. (Note: Joy says the terminus of the Lamplugh extension was Kidburngill, but the formal notice for the bill for the extension specifies Collier Yeat, and the subsequent formal notice for the extension down the Marron valley gives the existing terminus as Collier Yeat. There was a station at Kidburngill on the Marron extension, which was successively renamed Winder Gate, and then Lamplugh; in a court case in 1865 the contractor for the extensions said work on the section from Rowrah to Kidburngill started in August 1864.)

Passenger services on the extension began 1 February 1864; the WC&ER preferred to let new track bed down thoroughly under mineral traffic before seeking a Board of Trade inspection and mineral traffic over (part of) the extension had been running since 15 September 1862. Six hundred and thirty thousand tons of ore a year were now being hauled over a line projected on the basis of a hundred thousand tons a year and £20 shares of the WC&ER (regularly paying dividends of 10% or more) were traded at £50.

Whitehaven, Cleator and Egremont Railway Act 1863
- Act of Parliament
- Parliament of the United Kingdom
- Long title: An Act to enable the Whitehaven, Cleator, and Egremont Railway Company to extend their Railway from Lamplugh, to join the Cockermouth and Workington Railway, in the County of Cumberland; to divert and alter a Portion of the Frizington Branch Railway at Cleator Moor; to raise further Capital; and for other Purposes.
- Citation: 26 & 27 Vict. c. lxiv

Dates
- Royal assent: 8 June 1863

In 1863, an act was sought for extension of the Frizington branch to a junction with the Cockermouth and Workington Railway at Bridgefoot, thus removing the need for ore to be exported through the tunnel at Whitehaven; authorisation of deviation in the Cleator area to avoid subsidence was also sought. Objectors to the bill drew attention to the high mileage rates charged by the WC&ER and claimed the extension was being promoted primarily to protect the WC&ER's monopoly by preventing other companies accessing the orefield, but the WC&ER got its act: the Whitehaven, Cleator and Egremont Railway Act 1863 (26 & 27 Vict. c. lxiv). Mineral traffic over the Marron extension began 15 January 1866, it being claimed that it reduced carriage costs by 1s. 6d. per ton, compared to the route via Whitehaven: the line opened for passenger traffic 2 April 1866, but provision was limited, and the revenue from mineral traffic dwarfed that from passengers and parcels; the WCE&R "although chiefly a railway for the conveyance of iron ore, also holds itself out to carry passengers" was the comment of counsel for a passenger injured in an accident on the line. By 1871, mineral traffic on the Marron extension was so heavy that the directors thought it necessary to double the line.

Hearing of plans of the Whitehaven and Furness Junction to build a branch from Sellafield to Egremont to give a more convenient route for south-bound ore, the WC&ER took steps to promote a line of their own (to give a better basis for opposition to the W&FJR's project) An act for the Sellafield-Egremont line (as the Cleator and Furness Railway – a joint line of the W&FJR and the WC&ER) was obtained as the Cleator and Furness Railway Act 1866 (29 & 30 Vict. c. cxxxii).

=== Local neighbours taken over; overtures from LNWR rejected ===
Also in 1866 the W&FJR was absorbed by the Furness Railway, and the Cockermouth and Workington by the London and North Western Railway, but the WC&ER had suitable safeguards on tolls and powers inserted in the relevant acts. (Note: The Marron extension would be linked to the Bulgill branch (then under construction) of the Maryport and Carlisle Railway by two miles of the C&WR; together they would give a route to Scotland and Tyneside independent of other Cumbrian railways, given adequate running powers and reasonable tolls over the C&WR. An earlier Bill whereby the C&WR was to be leased by the Whitehaven Junction Railway had been defeated by the WC&ER and the M&CR, because suitable tolls and powers had not been offered. In sharp contrast, the L&NWR met the demands of the WC&ER "in a very fair and liberal spirit and agreed to everything they asked for".) An offer from the L&NWR to lease the WC&ER was rejected by the directors; the dividend having dropped to a mere 8% there were stormy scenes (and a motion for a committee of inquiry into the management of the railway) at the next half-yearly shareholders' meeting, a year later the dividend had recovered to its traditional 10%, and the shareholders' meeting passed off smoothly.

=== 'Great Dissatisfaction Among the Shareholders' ===
In February 1870, however, a shareholders' meeting voted for a committee of inquiry, passed a motion of no confidence in the board and called upon it to resign: this followed the admission that the company solicitor had been so dilatory in his completion of land purchases that the owners of land taken for construction of the original line some sixteen years ago had not yet received the purchase money, and were instead being paid interest at up to 10% per year on the sum owed them. The board did not resign, admitting to procrastination by the company solicitor, but pointing out that the effect on company finances (and in particular the dividend, which had averaged over 10%) had been minimal: instead they called another meeting to affirm confidence in the board. Although the meeting was again stormy the directors had exerted themselves sufficiently to gather enough proxies to reverse the earlier vote.

=== LNWR rebuffed again ===
By the end of August 1870, almost all the purchases had been satisfactorily completed, a dividend of 11% a year was declared, and harmony was restored, a proposal by the LNWR to lease the line, guaranteeing a dividend of 10% in perpetuity, being the main subject of discussion. Against the chairman's advice (and although the Furness Railway – the only alternative suitor – supported the LNWR offer) the WC&ER board sought to negotiate an even better deal but the LNWR (who were so confident of acceptance that they had already given notice of the necessary legislation) then withdrew their offer before it could be put to WC&ER shareholders and the chairman resigned. The next half-yearly meeting approved a dividend of 14% (revenue in the half-year was £35,000 and expenses £14,000, leaving (after transferring £3,000 to reserves) £21,000 to cover the dividend) but dissatisfaction was expressed that £3,000 of profit had been overlooked when declaring the previous half-year's dividend.

=== Amalgamation ===
Whitehaven, Cleator, and Egremont Railway Act 1877
- Act of Parliament
- Parliament of the United Kingdom
- Long title: An Act to authorise the Whitehaven, Cleator, and Egremont Railway Company to make new Railways and other Works in the county of Cumberland; to raise further Capital; and for other purposes.
- Citation: 40 & 41 Vict. c. ccxii

Dates
- Royal assent: 6 August 1877

Text of statute as originally enacted

London and North-western Railway (Whitehaven, Cleator, and Egremont Railway Vesting) Act 1877
- Act of Parliament
- Parliament of the United Kingdom
- Long title: An Act for vesting in the London and North-Western Railway Company the undertaking of the Whitehaven, Cleator, and Egremont Railway Company; and for other purposes.
- Citation: 40 & 41 Vict. c. xlvii

Dates
- Royal assent: 28 June 1877

Text of statute as originally enacted

London and North-western and Furness Railway Companies (Whitehaven, Cleator, and Egremont Railway Vesting) Act 1878
- Act of Parliament
- Parliament of the United Kingdom
- Long title: An Act for vesting in the Furness Railway Company jointly with the London and North-western Railway Company thee Whitehaven, Cleator, and Egremont Railway; and for other purposes.
- Citation: 41 & 42 Vict. c. xcv

Dates
- Royal assent: 17 June 1878

Text of statute as originally enacted

Many iron- and steel-works had set up in West Cumbria to be close to the orefield; their owners (faced with increased competition in the mid-1870s) thought the high dividends of the WC&ER indicated that its freight charges were too high; they were sufficiently united, determined, and able to secure local support, that their promotion of the Cleator and Workington Junction Railway obtained its act of Parliament, the Cleator and Workington Junction Railway Act 1876 (39 & 40 Vict. c. li), despite the opposition of the WC&ER, the LNWR, and the Furness Railway. Since the choice of railway routing lay with the consignee, not the consignor, the C&WJR (the 'track of the ironmasters') was thought likely to take considerable traffic from the WC&ER, which therefore now accepted the LNWR's offer of amalgamation in return for a guaranteed 10% dividend. This alarmed both the C&WJR and the Furness, which now joined forces and both objected to the amalgamation bill. The C&WJR came forward with a further bill for extension to a junction with the Cleator and Furness at Egremont and with the Maryport and Carlisle at Dearham; the system was to be operated by the Furness (which supported the bill). A compromise was reached between the LNWR, the Furness and the C&WJR, and the WC&ER amalgamation act, the London and North-western Railway (Whitehaven, Cleator, and Egremont Railway Vesting) Act 1877 (40 & 41 Vict. c. xlvii) was obtained in June 1877 (the LNWR having to promise the ironmasters a significant reduction of the freight rates): as envisaged by the compromise, the C&WJR did not proceed with its extensions, and a further act, the London and North-western and Furness Railway Companies (Whitehaven, Cleator, and Egremont Railway Vesting) Act 1878 (41 & 42 Vict. c. xcv), was passed the following year making the WC&ER system a joint line of the LNWR and the Furness. At the final shareholders' meeting of the company it was noted that the value of WC&ER £100 shares had been £170 before the intention to amalgamate had been announced; now that amalgamation was complete they were worth £230; by 1879 the Furness chairman was reporting a loss on the Furness's half-share of £9,000 during the first half of the year because of the reduced freight rates and a downturn in the iron trade.

At the 1923 grouping, both the LNWR and the Furness Railway (and therefore also the WC&ER) were absorbed into the London, Midland and Scottish Railway (LMS). The LMS became part of British Railways at nationalisation in 1948.

== Geography of the WCE&ER system ==
From a junction with the Whitehaven and Furness Junction Railway (absorbed into the Furness railway in 1866) at Mirehouse Junction, one mile south of Whitehaven (Corkickle) the line climbed steeply to Moor Row where the company had its engine shed and works. Just beyond Moor Row was a junction, from which one arm of the system headed north and east through Cleator Moor to Frizington. This arm originally terminated at the Parkside mines in Frizington, but as a result of subsequent extensions it eventually ran to a junction with the LNWR's Cockermouth-Workington line at Marron Junction. Stations on this arm were Cleator Moor - Frizington - Eskett (later Yeathouse) - Winder - Rowrah - Wright Green (later Lamplugh) - Ullock - Branthwaite - Bridgefoot - Marron Junction. From Moor Row junction, the other arm ran south to Egremont, with an intermediate station at Woodend. The southern arm was later extended (by the Cleator and Furness Railway - jointly owned by the WC&ER and the Furness Railway) via Beckermet where there was an intermediate station to a junction with the Furness's Whitehaven-Barrow line at Sellafield There was no north–south curve at the Moor Row junction. Various deviations from the original line were found necessary because of mining subsidence: most notably a new route through Cleator Moor (and a new Cleator Moor station) had to be built, although the old alignment was retained as the Crossfield branch (and the old station used as a goods station). The purpose of the WC&ER was to serve the mines that sprang up on the ore-field (and later the iron- and steel-works of the area), and therefore there was an extensive system of mineral railway branches running to mines and works (the Bigrigg, Beckermet, Eskett, Ehen Valley, Gillfoot, Mowbray, Pallaflat, and Ullcoats Branches). The Gilgarran Branch ran from a north-facing junction just north of Ullock to a colliery at Gilgarran, but was then extended via Distington, where it served an ironworks, to a south-facing junction with the main LNWR line along the coast at Parton.

== Closures ==
As mines closed, the branches serving them were closed. Passenger services over the system were withdrawn in the 1930s (northern arm 1931, southern arm 1935). The northern arm beyond a quarry at Rowrah was closed in 1954 (the track was lifted in 1964). After 1970, the southern arm was open only as far as the Florence iron ore mine at Egremont. British Steel ceased operations at the Rowrah quarry in 1978, and at Florence mine in 1980; complete closure of the line followed soon thereafter.

== See also ==
- Cumbrian Coast Line (history)
