= Great Broughton, Cumbria =

Village in Cumbria, England

Coordinates: 54.668°N 3.436°W

Great Broughton
- Village
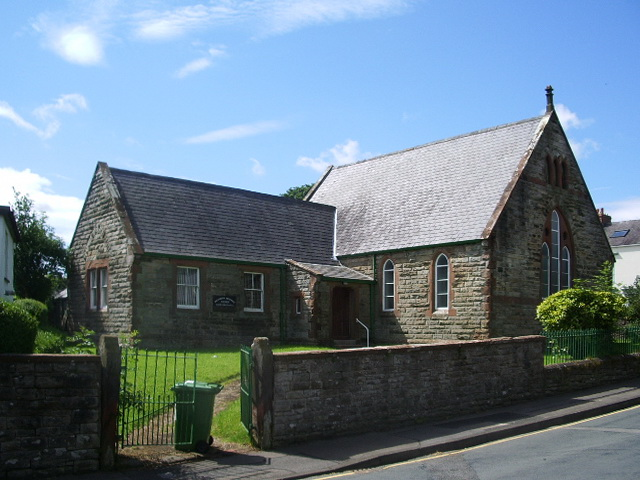
- Broughton Methodist Church

- Location in the former Allerdale district, Cumbria Location within Cumbria
- OS grid reference: NY074314
- Civil parish: Broughton
- Unitary authority: Cumberland
- Ceremonial county: Cumbria
- Region: North West
- Country: England
- Sovereign state: United Kingdom
- Post town: COCKERMOUTH
- Postcode district: CA13
- Dialling code: 01900
- Police: Cumbria
- Fire: Cumbria
- Ambulance: North West
- UK Parliament: Penrith and Solway

Great Broughton is a village and former civil parish, now in the parish of Broughton, in the Cumberland district, in the ceremonial county of Cumbria, England. It caters strongly for visitors. The estimated resident population was 1,823 in 2017.

== Location ==
Great Broughton is 3 miles (4.8 km) west of Cockermouth, just north of River Derwent and the A66 road, and 4 miles (6.4 km) from the sea at Flimby. Neighbouring villages are Camerton to the west, Broughton Moor to the north and Papcastle to the east.

== Governance ==
The village is in the parliamentary constituency of Penrith and Solway.

For local government purposes, the village was in the Broughton St Bridget electoral ward of Allerdale Borough Council, which stretched north to Bridekirk and had a population at the 2011 Census of 4,178. Broughton is now part of the Dearham and Broughton Ward of Cumberland Council.

The village has its own parish council, Broughton Parish Council, which covers Great & Little Broughton.

Great Broughton was formerly a township in Bridekirk parish, from 1866 Great Broughton was a civil parish in its own right until it was abolished on 1 October 1898 to form Broughton and Broughton Moor. In 1891 the parish had a population of 1447.

== Amenities and features ==
The village has a local shop, holiday cottages, a primary school, three pubs and a Royal British Legion branch. There is a 15-room hotel named the Broughton Craggs at the bottom of the village on the road heading to Cockermouth. Several houses offer bed and breakfast. Great Broughton also borders the village of Little Broughton, which contains both new housing estates and older houses, along with a pub, the Sundial.

The churchyard of the Anglican Christ Church contains a Grade II listed war memorial erected in 1921, bearing the names of 22 servicemen killed in the First World War and five servicemen and a female civilian killed in the Second.

There is a Methodist church in the village, but the congregation is no longer active. A planning application was approved in 2005 to turn the building into a dwelling.

Broughton Carnival takes place every July.

Until decommissioned in 1992, the RNAD Broughton Moor bordered the top end of the village. The Ministry of Defence police houses remain as South Terrace. The rest of the former RNAD site is still up for tender from its current owners, Cumbria County Council, which purchased it from the Ministry of Defence for a nominal sum in 2007.

== Access ==
The village is on a bus route to Cockermouth. It once had a station on the Cleator and Workington Junction Railway, but it closed to passengers in 1908 and completely in 1921. The nearest station today is at Workington, 7 miles (11 km) away, which has services to Barrow, Whitehaven and Carlisle.

During the floods of November 2009, the main bridge over the River Derwent, giving access to the village from the A66, sustained structural damage and was closed pending a structural report from engineers. The bridge was built in 1832. It re-opened after structural work in early 2010.

== See also ==
- Listed buildings in Broughton, Cumbria
