= St Peter's Church, Camerton =

Coordinates: 54.6558°N 3.4973°W

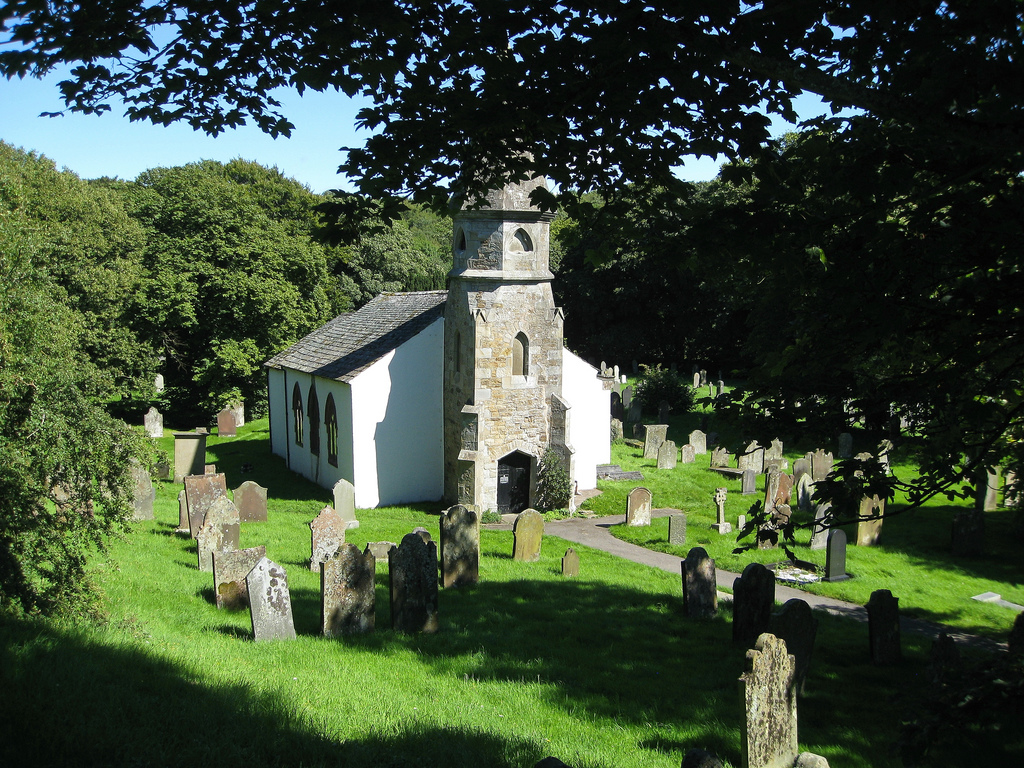
- St Peter's church seen from the northwest

- Location in Cumbria
- OS grid reference: NY 035300
- Location: Camerton, Cumbria
- Country: England
- Denomination: Church of England

History
- Status: Parish church
- Dedication: Saint Peter

Architecture
- Functional status: Active
- Heritage designation: Grade II
- Designated: 13 December 1985
- Architectural type: Church
- Completed: 1694

Administration
- Province: York
- Diocese: Carlisle
- Archdeaconry: West Cumberland
- Deanery: Solway
- Parish: Seaton and Camerton

Clergy
- Vicar: Rev. Ian Grainger

St Peter's Church, Camerton is the Church of England parish church of Camerton, Cumbria. It is about 1/2 mile (800 m) south of the village.

== History ==
The church is on the bank of the River Derwent, in a bend surrounded on three east, north and south by the river and on the west by farmland. Access is by a road through fields. There is car parking at the church but no toilet facilities.

St Peter's church has served the parish since about the 11th century, and is one of the oldest parishes in the Diocese of Carlisle. But the church has been rebuilt at least twice, in 1694 and again in 1796. The Gothic Revival west tower and spire were added in 1855.

In the church is the effigy of Sir Thomas Curwen, nicknamed Black Tom, dated 1510.

The church was restored in 1885 and 1892. For a considerable time after building, the churchyard at Camerton was the burial place for Workington and Flimby as well as Camerton and Seaton. . St Peter's is a Grade II listed building.

The church was closed for 19 months after the floods of 2009.

== See also ==
- Listed buildings in Camerton, Cumbria
