= Broughton Moor =

Village and civil parish in Cumbria, England

Coordinates: 54°41′15″N 3°28′11″W

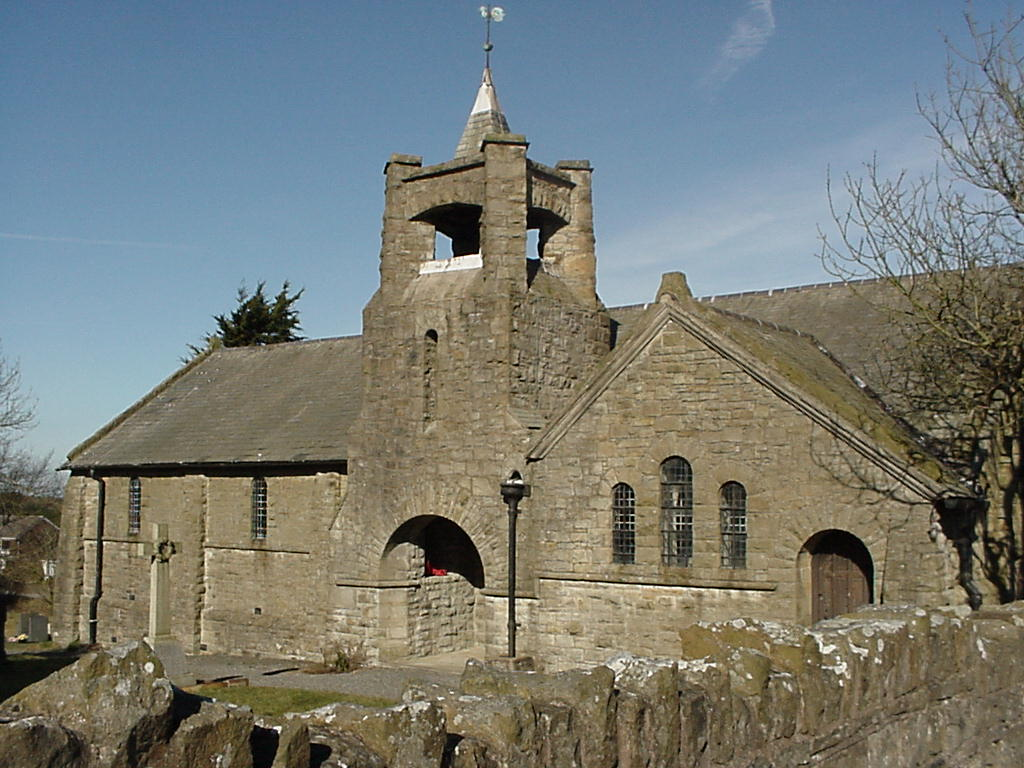
- St Columba's Church

- Location in Allerdale, Cumbria Location within Cumbria
- Population: 783 (2011)
- OS grid reference: NY061345
- Civil parish: Broughton Moor
- Unitary authority: Cumberland
- Ceremonial county: Cumbria
- Region: North West
- Country: England
- Sovereign state: United Kingdom
- Post town: MARYPORT
- Postcode district: CA15
- Dialling code: 01900
- Police: Cumbria
- Fire: Cumbria
- Ambulance: North West
- UK Parliament: Penrith and Solway

Broughton Moor is a village and civil parish in Cumbria, England. It is situated on an extensive moor about 2 miles (3.2 km) north of Broughton, 5 miles (8 km) north west of Cockermouth, 2.5 miles (4.0 km) south of Maryport and 4.5 miles (7 km) north of Workington.

According to the 2001 census it had a population of 726, increasing to 783 at the 2011 Census.

In addition to the village of Broughton Moor, the parish includes Harker Marsh (grid reference NY061345).

== History ==
The earliest record of Broughton Moor (then spelled Broghton more) appeared as early as 1187 in Holme Cultram Abbey records. Broughton Moor was formed into a civil parish on 1 October 1898, by Local Government Board Order 38,315, from Great Broughton and Little Broughton townships, and was in the Workington division of the county, the ward of Allerdale-below-Derwent, Derwent petty sessional division, Cockermouth Poor Law Union, the county court district of Cockermouth and Workington, the rural deanery of Maryport, the Archdeacon of West Cumberland and the Diocese of Carlisle.

The church of St Columba, erected in 1904, is a building of stone, with chancel, nave, south porch and a tower containing one bell. The Church was consecrated on 3 May 1905. It was built by the villagers under the direction of Lloyd Wilson to the designs of the well-known church architect, W. D. Caroe, who gave his services gratuitously. It is said that Mr Caroe had recently returned from a visit to St Columba's on the island of Iona and that he was influenced by the ruined abbey church of Our Lady, hence the feeling of early Celtic influence. Until 1936, St Columba's was a chapelry in the Parish of Christ Church, Little Broughton. It is now a listed building. The register dates from 1905. There is a Wesleyan chapel, built in 1903, and there was a Primitive Methodist chapel, built 1864.

Broughton Moor belongs to Cumberland's former coal mining industry. There were collieries here and opencast coal sites cleared many of the deep mines in April 1958. Coal production ceased at Broughton Moor in June 1959 but was started up again sometime after 1964 when the Blooming Heather opencast site extended towards the village from nearby Dearham.

The soil is limey; subsoil, stone. The population in 1912 was 932. Between the 1930s and 1992 the area was home to Royal Navy Armaments Depot Broughton Moor

== Governance ==
The village is part of the parliamentary constituency of Penrith and Solway.

For Local Government purposes it is in the Cumberland unitary authority area.

The village also has its own Parish Council; Broughton Moor Council.

== Broughton Moor today ==
Broughton Moor is a quiet village situated almost centrally in the triangle formed by Cockermouth, Maryport and Workington. With a current population of around 600 (adults) it was built originally to house the mining community. Only two miles from the coast, Broughton Moor is situated on a ridge overlooking the Solway Firth to the north with superb views and spectacular sunsets over the Galloway Hills, while to the south there is the incomparable vista of the Lakeland Fells. There is a mix of privately owned and local authority housing and a blend of social groups. Nowadays the local coal mines have closed, and after extensive opencast mining in recent years the land has reverted to its former agricultural state. The majority of the workforce are employed outside the village in surrounding towns and industries.

The village includes Broughton Moor Primary School with approximately 70 children on roll and a preschool. In addition to St Columba's Parish Church, Broughton Moor has a Methodist Chapel. The village also has a Public House, The Miners Arms, a village shop and a fish and chip shop.

The area surrounding the village offers walks over fields and through woodland and there is a small tarn. There is diverse wildlife such as red squirrels, foxes, badgers, buzzards, sparrowhawks, pheasants, owls etc. as well as those species more frequently seen.

Part of the tarn field has been purchased by Persimmon Homes who are currently building over 40 new homes on the site.

The village is still locally well respected due to the part it played in World War II. See RNAD Broughton Moor.

== See also ==
- Listed buildings in Broughton Moor
- Royal Navy Armaments Depot Broughton Moor
