= Camerton railway station =

Camerton railway station may refer to:

- Camerton railway station (Somerset), a former railway station in Camerton, Somerset, England
- Camerton railway station (Cumberland), a disused station in Camerton, Cumberland (now Cumbria), England
- Camerton Colliery Halt railway station, another disused station in Camerton, Cumbria, England
