= Dovenby =

Village in Cumbria, England

Coordinates: 54.68°N 3.41°W

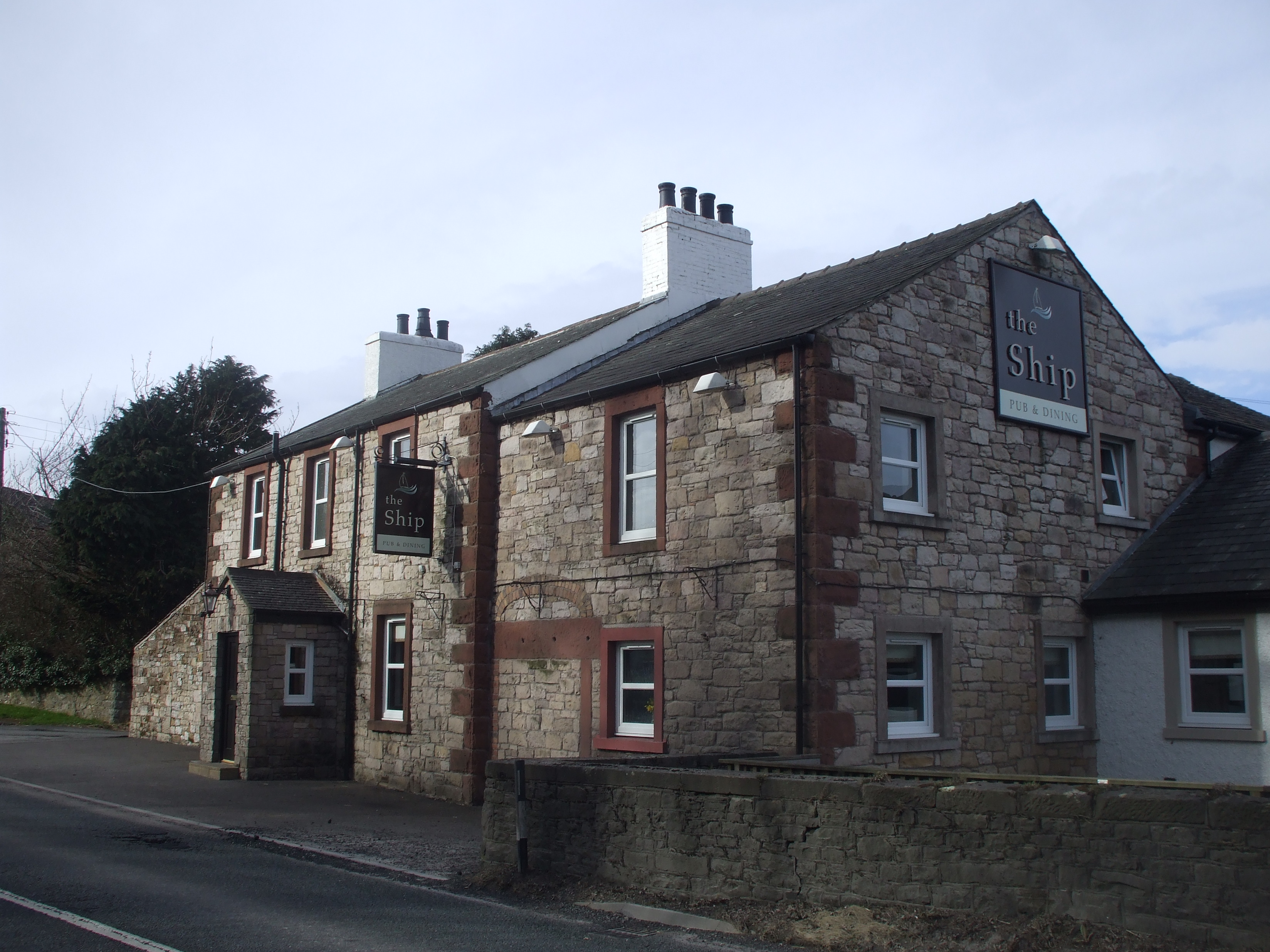
- The Ship public house, Dovenby

- Location in Allerdale, Cumbria Location within Cumbria
- OS grid reference: NY0933
- Civil parish: Bridekirk
- Unitary authority: Cumberland
- Ceremonial county: Cumbria
- Region: North West
- Country: England
- Sovereign state: United Kingdom
- Post town: COCKERMOUTH
- Postcode district: CA13
- Dialling code: 01900
- Police: Cumbria
- Fire: Cumbria
- Ambulance: North West
- UK Parliament: Penrith and Solway

Dovenby is a village and former civil parish, now in the parish of Bridekirk, in the Cumberland district, in the county of Cumbria, England. It is on the A594 road and is 2.5 miles (4.0 km) north west of Cockermouth, 2.6 miles (4.2 km) east of Dearham, 4.5 miles (7.2 km) east of Maryport, 7.4 miles (11.9 km) north east of Workington and 27 miles (43.5 km) south west of Carlisle. In 1931 the parish had a population of 163.

== Toponymy ==
'Dovenby' is 'Dufan's bȳ' or 'Dufan's hamlet or village'. 'Bȳ' is late Old English, from Old Norse 'býr'. The personal name 'Dufan' "is of Irish origin (OIr 'Dubhán'), a diminutive of 'dubh', 'black', but it is on record from Iceland."

== Governance ==
Dovenby is part of the Penrith and Solway constituency for the UK parliament.

For Local Government purposes it's in the Cumberland unitary authority area.

It was previously part of the Broughton St Bridget's electoral ward of Allerdale Borough Council. This ward stretched north to Bridekirk with a total population at the 2011 Census of 4,178. Dovenby was part of the Dearham and Broughton Ward of Cumbria County Council.

For Parish Council purposes Dovenby belongs to Bridekirk Parish Council, along with the villages of Tallentire and Bridekirk.

Dovenby was formerly a township in Bridekirk parish, from 1866 Dovenby was a civil parish in its own right until it was abolished on 1 April 1934 and merged with Bridekirk.

== Dovenby Hall ==
The oldest part of the estate is a 13th century peel tower. The main house was built for Sir Thomas Lamplugh in the 16th century and, after the house came into the ownership of the Dykes family in about 1800, it was remodelled for the Ballentine-Dykes family in the early 19th century.

The house was acquired by the local authorities from Colonel Ballantine-Dykes for use as a mental hospital in 1930. Following the closure of the hospital, it was bought by Malcolm Wilson, a former rally driver, in January 1998 and, after a major refurbishment, then became home to Ford's World Rally Championship team.

== M-Sport ==
Dovenby is the headquarters of M-Sport the auto racing team.

== Notable people ==
- Malcolm Wilson (born 1956), rally driver and rally-team owner
- Matthew Wilson (born 29 January 1987), rally driver

== See also ==
- Listed buildings in Bridekirk
