= Listed buildings in Bridekirk =

Bridekirk is a civil parish in the Cumberland district in Cumbria, England. It contains 29 listed buildings that are recorded in the National Heritage List for England. All the listed buildings are designated at Grade II, the lowest of the three grades, which is applied to "buildings of national importance and special interest". The parish contains the villages of Bridekirk, Dovenby and Tallentire. Most of the listed buildings are houses and associated structures, or farmhouses and farm buildings, in or near these villages. The other listed buildings include two cross bases, a church, the ruins of its predecessor and tombs in the churchyard, a public house, a former timber saw mill and associated buildings, three milestones, and a monument.

== Buildings ==
Name and location	Photograph	Date	Notes
Cross base, St Bride's Church; 54.69056°N 3.37203°W	—	Medieval	The cross base is in the churchyard of St Bride's Church to the east of the church. It is in calciferous sandstone and consists of a stone with one side broken, giving the appearance of a seat.
Cross base, Dovenby Hall; 54.68680°N 3.40390°W	—	Medieval	The cross base is in a field to the northeast of the hall. It is in red sandstone, and consists of a stone with a rectangular socket and the remains of a square tapered shaft.
Ruin of St Bridget's Church; 54.69063°N 3.37123°W		12th century	The ruin is in the churchyard of the present active church. It is in calciferous sandstone and red sandstone, and only part of three of the chancel walls remain. The east window consists of three round-headed lights, the south window is mullioned and its lintel consists of a medieval grave slab. Inside are three aumbries.
Dovenby Hall and rear wing 54.68558°N 3.40552°W	—	Late 13th century	Originally a fortified house, it was extended in 17th century, remodelled as a country house in the early 19th century, and later used for other purposes. It is stuccoed with green slate roofs, and consists of a tower and a two-storey house with an L-shaped plan. Its features include an Ionic portico with four columns, windows, some of which are sashes and others are mullioned, a two-storey canted bay window, armorial plaques, and a sundial.
Bush Inn; 54.70566°N 3.38513°W		Late 17th century (probable)	Originally a private house, later used as a public house, it was altered in the 19th century. The building is rendered with a Welsh slate roof, and has two storeys and two bays. It has a plank door and casement windows, all with hood moulds.
Middle Farmhouse; 54.70414°N 3.38700°W	—	Late 17th or early 18th century	A roughcast farmhouse with a green slate roof, in two storeys and four bays. It has a gabled porch, and sash windows under continuous hood moulds in both floors. At the rear are horizontal sliding sash windows in the upper floor.
Thompson tomb 54.69052°N 3.37152°W	—	1688	The tomb is in the churchyard of St Bride's Church, to the east of the church. It is a table tomb, and carries a long inscription.
Trough House; 54.68682°N 3.40691°W	—	1711	Originally a farmhouse, later a private house, it is roughcast on a chamfered plinth, with a string course, quoins, an eaves cornice, and a green slate roof. The doorway and the sash windows have architraves, and above the door is a fanlight.
Midtown Farmhouse and stables 54.70514°N 3.38559°W	—	Early 18th century	The farmhouse and attached stables are roughcast with green slate roofs. The house has two storeys and five bays, with a single-bay stable to the right, and a single-storey extension to the left. The house has a 20th-century porch, and casement windows in chamfered surrounds, and in the stable is a plank door and a loft door above.
Burton House; 54.70562°N 3.38524°W	—	1727	A roughcast house with a green slate roof, in two storeys and three bays, and with a lower recessed three bays to the left. The main part of the house contains casement windows, and in the recessed part the windows are sashes.
Anns Hill; 54.68059°N 3.36799°W		Mid 18th century	A house with its front in channelled reeded ashlar on a chamfered plinth, with an eaves cornice, quoins, and a green slate roof that has coped gables. It has two storeys with an attic and five bays. The doorway and the sash windows have architraves, and in the left gable wall is an attic window.
Trohear and Paitson tombs 54.69052°N 3.37162°W	—	Mid 18th century	The tombs are in the churchyard of St Bride's Church, to the east of the church. They are in sandstone, and both are table tombs dated respectively 1742 and 1752.
Dale House; 54.70623°N 3.38322°W	—	1753	A rendered house on a chamfered plinth, with an eaves cornice, quoins, and a green slate roof. It has two storeys and four bays. The doorway and the sash windows have architraves.
Tallentire Hall; 54.70377°N 3.39125°W	—	c. 1770	A country house incorporating a stair turret from a previous 16th-century hall, and extended in 1863. It is in calciferous sandstone with green slate roofs, and has two storeys. The main block has nine bays, with two three-bay extensions to the rear, and the stair turret at the left. The turret has three storeys and an embattled parapet. On the front of the house is a Doric porch, and the windows are of various types; other features include a balustraded parapet and bay windows. Adjoining the right rear extension is a three-storey tower with a pyramidal roof.
Lime Tree House; 54.68634°N 3.40840°W	—	1771	A roughcast house with quoins and a green slate roof, in two storeys and three bays. The doorway has an architrave with a pediment, and the windows are sashes.
The Chestnuts and barn 54.70684°N 3.38244°W	—	Late 18th or early 19th century	The farmhouse and the barn attached to its rear have green slate roofs. The house is stuccoed with quoins, it has two storeys and three bays, and the windows are sashes. The barn is in rubble and has two storeys and three bays, with a lower barn to the right. It contains doorways, ventilation slits, windows and, at the rear, a segmental-headed cart entrance.
Milestone north of Dovenby; 54.69182°N 3.41000°W	—	Late 18th or early 19th century	The milestone was provided for the Cockermouth to Maryport Turnpike road. It is in stone with a rounded top and has a curved face with a cast iron plate. The plate is inscribed with the distances in miles to Cockermouth Court House and to Maryport Market Place.
Milestone, Papcastle roundabout 54.67211°N 3.37530°W	—	Late 18th or early 19th century	The milestone was provided for the Cockermouth to Maryport Turnpike road. It is in stone with a rounded top and has a curved face with a cast iron plate. The plate is inscribed with the distances in miles to Cockermouth Court House and to Maryport Market Place.
Milestone south of Ann's Hill; 54.67773°N 3.36768°W		Late 18th or early 19th century	The milestone is in stone and has a rounded top and a curved face with a cast iron plate. The plate is inscribed with the distances in miles to Carlisle, Wigton, and Cockermouth.
School of Nursing; 54.68820°N 3.40539°W	—	Late 18th or early 19th century	A stuccoed house with an eaves cornice, angle pilasters, and a green slate roof. There are two storeys and three bays, and the windows are sashes. The central doorway has pilasters and a fanlight. At the rear is a round-headed stair window.
Monument; 54.68196°N 3.40334°W	—	1837	The monument is in the grounds of Dovenby Hall. It is in pink sandstone and consists of a stepped plinth and a square shaft carrying an urn. There are inscriptions on two faces.
Anns Hill Lodge; 54.67981°N 3.36840°W	—	Early 19th century	The former lodge is pebbledashed on a plinth, and has an eaves cornice, quoins, and a green slate roof. It is in a single storey and two bays, and has pedimented gables with shaped finials. The doorway has an architrave, and the windows are casements with either architraves or shaped lintels.
Bridekirk Vicarage; 54.69030°N 3.37112°W	—	Early 19th century	The vicarage is rendered on a chamfered plinth, and it has a string course, quoins, and a green slate roof, and is in Georgian style. There are two storeys and four bays, with a higher single-bay extension to the left. On the front is a projecting Ionic porch, and above the door is a fanlight. The windows are sashes with architraves, and in the ground floor they have hood moulds. In the extension are two-storey canted bay windows.
Dovenby Mill; 54.68642°N 3.39075°W	—	Mid 19th century	Originating as a timber saw mill, it is in calciferous sandstone with quoins and a green slate roof. The building has three storeys and two bays, with lower extensions to the front and to the left, giving it an L-shaped plan. In the main part is a doorway with a quoined surround, and sash windows. In the front extension is a sliding door and ventilation slits, and the left extension contains a garage door.
Dovenby Mill House; 54.68632°N 3.39101°W	—	Mid 19th century	The house is in calciferous sandstone with red sandstone quoins and a green slate roof. It has two storeys and three bays, and the windows are mullioned. The doorway and windows have chamfered surrounds, and above them are hood moulds.
Barn, Dovenby Mill; 54.68623°N 3.39119°W	—	Mid 19th century	The barn is in calciferous sandstone with quoins, a green slate roof, and gables with bargeboards. It has 2 1/2 storeys and five bays. The barn contains a central carriage opening with an elliptical arch, doorways, a loft door, and ventilation slits on two levels.
Lamp post, Tallentire Hall (northeast); 54.70398°N 3.39121°W	—	Mid 19th century	The lamp post is in cast iron. It has a square plinth with winged birds holding a draped urn. The shaft is decorated with a pattern of leaves and flowers, and it carries two segmental-arched arms with a floral head and an upright globe.
Lamp post, Tallentire Hall (southeast); 54.70366°N 3.39095°W	—	Mid 19th century	The lamp post is in cast iron. It has a square plinth with winged birds holding a draped urn. The shaft is decorated with a pattern of leaves and flowers, and it carries two segmental-arched arms with a floral head and an upright globe.
St Bride's Church; 54.69046°N 3.37231°W		1868–70	Designed by Cory and Ferguson, the church is in calciferous sandstone with green slate roofs. It has a cruciform plan, and consists of a nave with a south porch, a tower at the crossing, transepts, and a chancel with an apse. Its style is Norman, and it incorporates some Norman material and items from an earlier church, including the font. In the west front is a wheel window over three round-headed lancets.
