= Abraham Fletcher =

English mathematician

- Born: 1714; Little Broughton, Bridekirk, Cumberland, England
- Died: January 1, 1793 (aged 78–79)
- Occupations: Mathematician, schoolmaster
- Notable work: The Universal Measurer (1752–53), The Universal Measurer and Mechanic (1762)

Abraham Fletcher (1714 – 1 January 1793) was an English mathematician.

== Life ==
Fletcher was born in Little Broughton, Bridekirk, Cumberland, and was the son of a tobacco-pipe maker, who taught him his own trade but gave him no higher instruction. Fletcher learnt to read, write, and cipher as best as he could, applying himself particularly to the study of arithmetic, from which he proceeded to the investigation of mathematical theorems. After the day's toil in the workshop he would hoist himself by a rope into the loft over his father's cottage, in order to pursue his studies uninterruptedly. Having worked through Euclid he set up as a schoolmaster at the age of thirty, and acquired considerable reputation as a teacher of mathematics.

He married early. His wife, like his parents, discouraged the pursuit of learning as an unprofitable thing. Turning his attention to botany, Fletcher studied the properties rather than the classification of plants; increased his income by the sale of herbal decoctions, and was known to his neighbours as 'Doctor Fletcher.' He also studied judicial astrology and cast his own nativity. 'This gives,’ says another astrologer, 'seventy-eight years and fifty-five days' duration of life. Fletcher lived seventy-eight years seventy-one days, dying on 1 January 1793.

== Works ==
- The Universal Measurer. In Two Parts. The First Part Contains the Theory of Measuring in Projecting and Dividing the Forms of Superficial and Solid Figures. The Second Part Teacheth the Practice of Measuring in all it's various uses whether Artificers Works, Gauging, Surveying, or Mining, Whitehaven, 1752-53, 8vo. 2 Vols.
- The Universal Measurer and Mechanic, a work equally useful to the Gentleman, Tradesman, and Mechanic, with copperplates, London, 1762, 8vo.
