= Little Broughton =

Village in Cumbria, England

Coordinates: 54.673°N 3.432°W

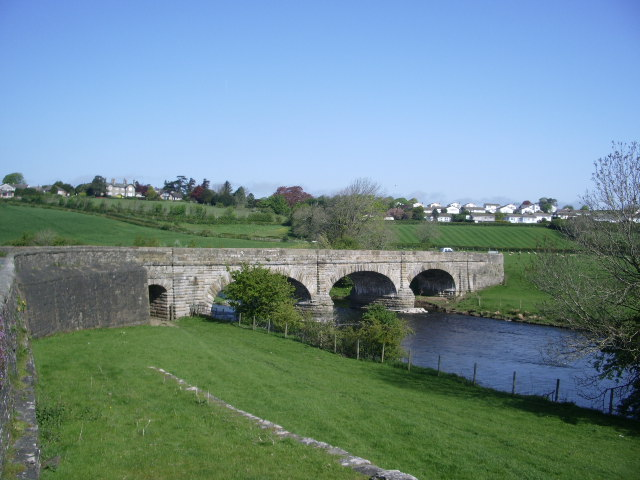
- Broughton High Bridge

- Location in Allerdale, Cumbria Location within Cumbria
- OS grid reference: NY076318
- Civil parish: Broughton
- Unitary authority: Cumberland
- Ceremonial county: Cumbria
- Region: North West
- Country: England
- Sovereign state: United Kingdom
- Post town: COCKERMOUTH
- Postcode district: CA13
- Dialling code: 01900
- Police: Cumbria
- Fire: Cumbria
- Ambulance: North West
- UK Parliament: Penrith and Solway

Little Broughton is a village and former civil parish, now in the parish of Broughton, in the Cumberland district, in the county of Cumbria, England, located 3 miles (4.8 km) west of Cockermouth. In 1891 the parish had a population of 820.

== Governance ==
Little Broughton is part of the Penrith and Solway constituency of the UK Parliament.

For Local Government purposes it was in the Broughton St Bridget's electoral ward of Allerdale Borough Council until 2023. This ward stretches north to Bridekirk with a total population at the 2011 Census of 4,178. It is now administered as part of the Cumberland unitary authority.

The village belongs to a Broughton Parish Council, which covers Great and Little Broughton.

Little Broughton was formerly a township in Bridekirk parish, from 1866 Little Broughton was a civil parish in its own right until it was abolished on 1 October 1898 to form Broughton and Broughton Moor.

== See also ==
- Listed buildings in Broughton, Cumbria
