= Listed buildings in Camerton, Cumbria =

Camerton is a civil parish in the Cumberland district in Cumbria, England. It contains three listed buildings that are recorded in the National Heritage List for England. All the listed buildings are designated at Grade II, the lowest of the three grades, which is applied to "buildings of national importance and special interest". The parish contains the village of Camerton and surrounding countryside. The listed buildings comprise a church, a country house, and a farmhouse and barn.

== Buildings ==
Name and location	Photograph	Date	Notes
St Peter's Church; 54.65632°N 3.49653°W		1694	The church was altered in 1796, and the tower added in 1855. The walls are roughcast, the tower is in calciferous sandstone rubble, and the roof is in green slate. The church consists of a three-bay nave, a tower incorporating a porch, a south chapel, and a single-bay chancel. The tower has anglebuttresses, a west door, and a short octagonal spire.
Camerton Hall; 54.66100°N 3.50036°W		Early 19th century	A country house, altered in 1910, stuccoed with string courses and a green slate roof, in late Georgian style. It has two storeys with an attic, a main range of four bays, and a rear extension with two storeys and five bays. On the front is a Tuscan porch and a door with a fanlight. The middle two bays are recessed, and the outer bays are bowed. The windows are sashes.
Ribton House and barn 54.66258°N 3.47345°W		Early 19th century	A farmhouse and barn in mixed calciferous sandstone and limestone rubble, with angle pilasters and a green slate roof. It has two storeys and three bays, with the barn at right-angles on the left. The windows in the house are sashes, and in the barn are a carriage entry with a segmental arch, blocked windows, and ventilation slits.
