= Camerton, Cumbria =

Village and civil parish in Cumbria, England

Coordinates: 54.664°N 3.495°W

Camerton
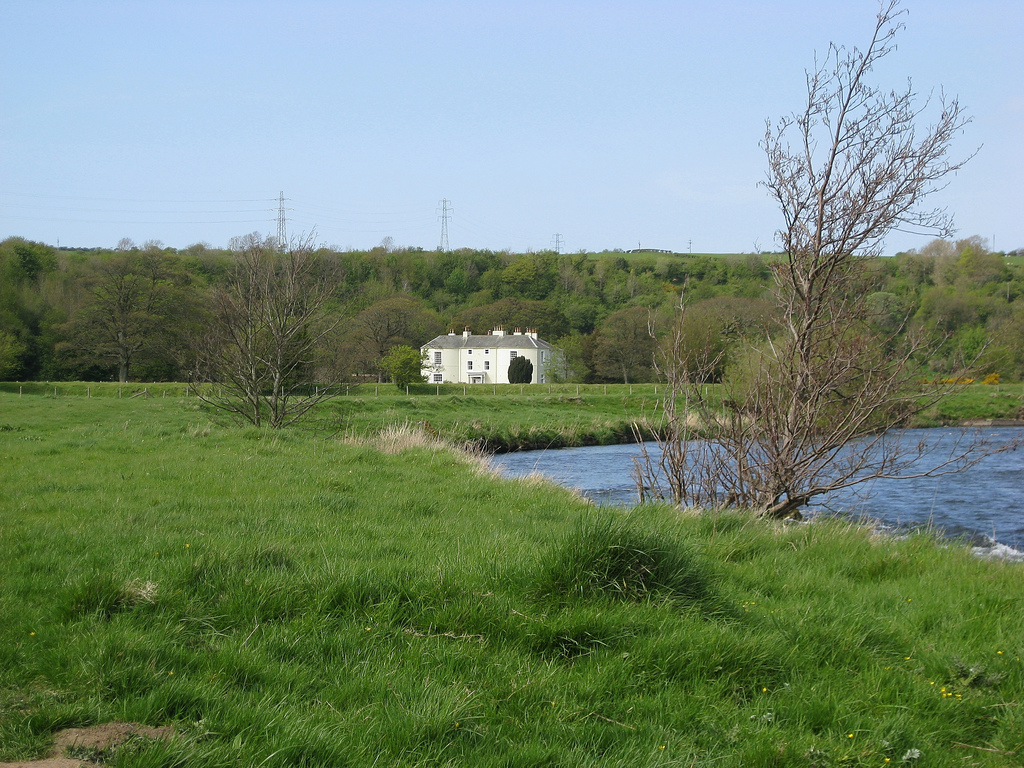
- Camerton Hall

- Location in Allerdale, Cumbria Location within Cumbria
- Population: 174 (2011)
- OS grid reference: NY037312
- Civil parish: Camerton
- Unitary authority: Cumberland
- Ceremonial county: Cumbria
- Region: North West
- Country: England
- Sovereign state: United Kingdom
- Post town: WORKINGTON
- Postcode district: CA14
- Dialling code: 01900
- Police: Cumbria
- Fire: Cumbria
- Ambulance: North West
- UK Parliament: Whitehaven and Workington

Camerton is a small village and civil parish in Cumbria, historically part of Cumberland, near the Lake District National Park in England. According to older maps, it was originally called "Camberton".

The village is situated about 1 mile (1.6 km) north-east of Seaton, 3.9 miles (6.3 km) north-east of Workington and 7.8 miles (12.6 km) west of Cockermouth. It's linked by road to Great Broughton and Flimby, and there was a small footbridge over the river to Great Clifton however this was destroyed by the floods of November 2009. It has a population of 172, increasing slightly to 174 at the 2011 Census.

== Governance ==
Camerton is part of the parliamentary constituency of Whitehaven and Workington.

For Local Government purposes it is in the Cumberland unitary authority area.

Camerton has its own Parish Council; Camerton Parish Council.

== Railways ==
Two railway lines once served Camerton. The line and railway station in the valley bottom were built by the Cockermouth and Workington Railway (CWR) which was eventually extended eastwards to Penrith, giving national connections and even the "Lakes Express", a through train to London, though this passed straight through Camerton. The station closed in 1952 and the line in 1966. In 2013 the station master's house was still in use as a private residence. The former railway embankment could still be seen, but the supports and pier of the former bridge over the river were washed away during the 2009 Workington floods, leaving no trace.

A second line ran on higher ground to the north of the village, this was the Cleator and Workington Junction Railway's (C&WJR) "Northern Extension" which was part of a wider venture to connect west Cumbrian ironworks with Scotland. Camerton never had a public station on that line, the nearest being at Seaton (Cumbria) and Great Broughton, though their lives as passenger stations were very short. Although this line lost its meagre passenger services past Camerton as early as 1908 and was closed and lifted north of Buckhill Colliery in the 1930s, trains still passed Camerton along it until 1992 to serve the RNAD Broughton Moor.

== Collieries ==
Camerton once had two pits, both of which mined both coal and clay. Camerton No. 2 Colliery was north of the village next to the C&WJR line where an unadvertised workmen's halt was provided. This colliery appears to have been abandoned in 1908.

Camerton No. 1 Colliery was next to the river. It was connected to the CWR line. It is unclear when it was abandoned.

Both pits had associated brickworks.

== Toponymy ==
'Tūn' is Old English for 'homestead' 'village'. The first element in the name might be a personal name (possibly 'Cāfmǣr') or else Welsh 'cym(m)er' 'confluence' that might refer to nearby stream and river, "but the phonology would offer difficulties, and the stream running into the Derwent is insignificant." So, the name means perhaps 'the village of Cāfmǣr', or 'the village by the confluence of waters'.

== St Peter's church ==
St Peter's church is located south-east of the village on a meander of the River Derwent. The church building partly dates from the mid-19th century, but "parts of the structure could be medieval, for instance, the transept arch with its step and chamfer." The church contains the tomb of 'Black Tom', an old 'lord' of Camerton. According to local legend, Black Tom's ghost haunts the churchyard. Black Tom is also the name of the village pub. Legend has it that a blue pig was seen one night by someone leaving the pub.

== Walking ==
There are walking opportunities in the area including the nearby Scaw Bank wood.

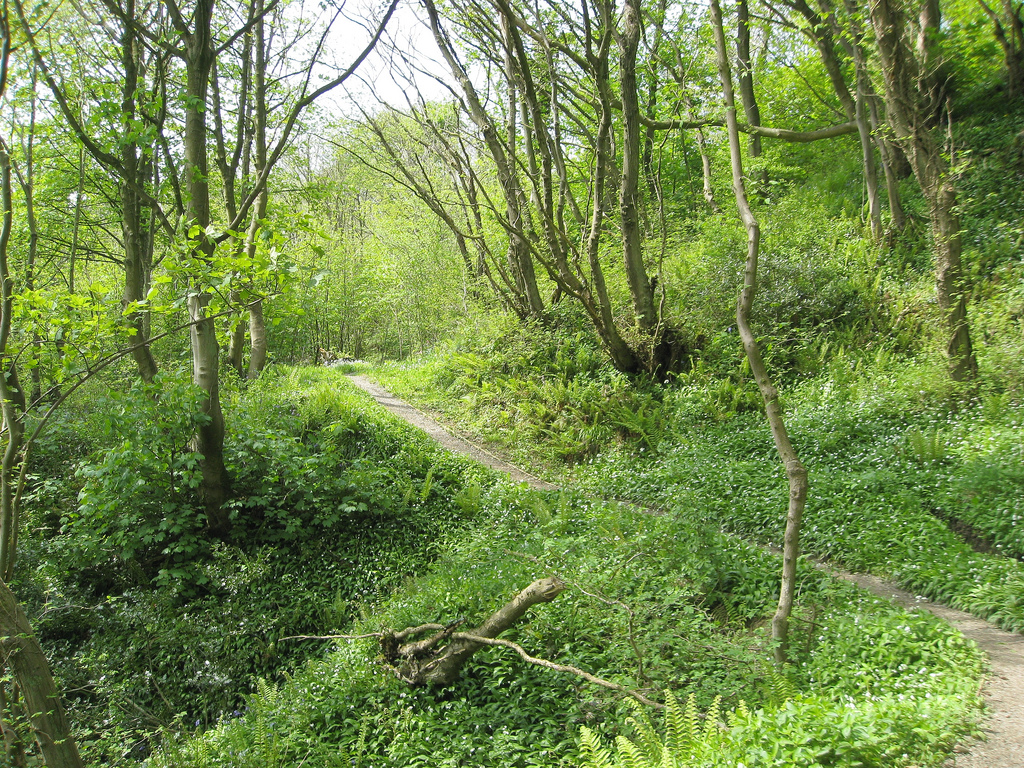
Scaw Bank Wood, Camerton

== See also ==
- Listed buildings in Camerton, Cumbria
