= Great Broughton railway station =

Disused railway station in Cumbria, England

Great Broughton

General information
- Location: Great Broughton, near Cockermouth, Cumberland; England
- Coordinates: 54.6748°N 3.4459°W
- Grid reference: NY068320
- Platforms: 1

Other information
- Status: Disused

History
- Original company: Cleator and Workington Junction Railway

Key dates
- 4 January 1888: Opened
- July 1897: Closed
- 1 September 1908: Opened
- 1 November 1908: Closed to passengers
- 1 September 1921: Closed completely
Location
- Location within the former Allerdale Borough Location within Cumbria

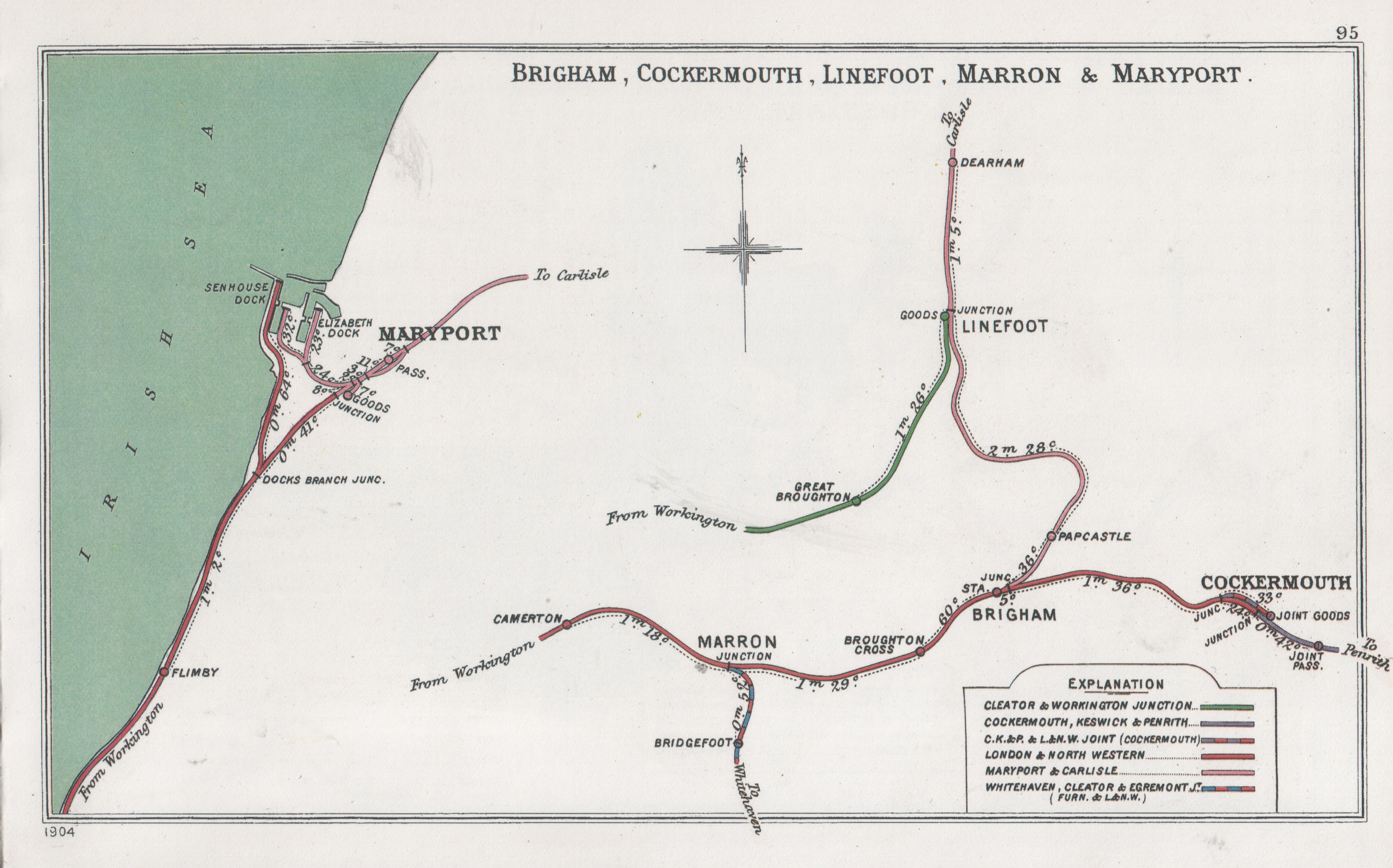
A 1904 Railway Clearing House Junction Diagram showing railways in the vicinity of the station

Great Broughton railway station briefly served the village of Great Broughton, near Cockermouth in Cumberland (now in Cumbria), England.

The station was opened by the Cleator and Workington Junction Railway (C&WJR) on 1 September 1908 on its "Northern Extension" from Calva Junction on the northern edge of Workington to the Maryport and Carlisle Railway's Derwent Branch at Linefoot. The C&WJR built this 7 miles 30 chains (11.9 km) line to connect the C&WJR with Carlisle and beyond. The line was double track from Workington to Seaton, then single through Great Broughton to Linefoot.

Most stations on C&WJR lines had heavy industrial neighbours, such as ironworks next to Cleator Moor West, or served primarily industrial workforces, such as Keekle Colliers' Platform. Great Broughton, however, was a fairly isolated country village, though there were small collieries nearby.

== History ==
The C&WJR was built in the late 1870s, being one of the fruits of the rapid industrialisation of West Cumberland in the second half of the nineteenth century, specifically being born as a reaction to oligopolistic behaviour by the London and North Western and Whitehaven, Cleator and Egremont Railways.

It was originally intended to drive the line northwards across country to meet the Caledonian Railway and cross into Scotland by the Solway Viaduct, but an accommodation was made with the LNWR leading to the intended northern extension being greatly watered down to three lines:

- a 1 mile 54 chains (2.7 km) link from Workington Central to Siddick Junction which opened in 1880
- a 30 chains (0.60 km) link from Cloffocks Junction to the CKPR line which opened in March 1885, and
- the "Northern Extension" through Great Broughton to Linefoot.

All lines in the area were primarily aimed at mineral traffic, notably iron ore, coal and limestone, none more so than the Northern Extension, which passed through open country. Passenger services were provided calling at Great Broughton, but they were so unsuccessful they petered out after a mere two months. The C&WJR earned the local name "The Track of the Ironmasters".

The founding Act of Parliament of June 1878 confirmed the company's agreement with the Furness Railway that the latter would operate the line for one third of the receipts.

All C&WJR's lines were heavily graded. Almost all of the first three miles of the Northern Extension from Calva Junction through Seaton was rising at 1 in 70, with gentler slopes thereafter to the extension's summit at Great Broughton This favoured loaded coal and coke trains heading for Workington..

The Northern Extension became part of the London, Midland and Scottish Railway at the Grouping of 1923.

Like any business tied to one or few industries, the C&WJR was particularly at the mercy of trade fluctuations and technological change. The Cumberland iron industry led the charge in the nineteenth century, but became less and less competitive as time passed and local ore became worked out and harder to win, taking the fortunes of the railway with it. The peak year was 1909, when the C&WJR handled 1,644,514 tons of freight. Ominously for the line, that tonnage was down to just over 800,000 by 1922, bringing receipts of £83,349, compared with passenger fares totalling £6,570.

The high water mark for tonnage on the C&WJR was 1909, the high water mark for progress was 1913, with the opening of the Harrington and Lowca line for passenger traffic. A chronology of the line's affairs from 1876 to 1992 has almost no entries before 1914 which fail to include "opened" or "commenced". After 1918 the position was reversed, when the litany of step-by-step closures and withdrawals was relieved only by a control cabin and a signalbox being erected at Harrington Junction in 1919.

== Services ==
C&WJR passenger trains consisted of antiquated Furness stock hauled largely by elderly Furness engines referred to as "rolling ruins" by one author after a footplate ride in 1949.

No Sunday passenger service was ever provided on any C&WJR line.

The Northern Extension had three stations: Seaton, Great Broughton and Linefoot, the last being run jointly with the Maryport and Carlisle Railway (MCR). A passenger service was provided to Seaton over two periods: 1888 to 1897 and 1907 to 1922. The service in the first period appears to have been out and back over the 2 miles 19 chains (3.6 km) to Workington Central. This was reduced to Wednesdays and Saturdays only (Workington Market Days) from March 1891 and to Saturdays only from January 1894, being withdrawn completely in July 1897.

The company tried again ten years later, with what appears to have been another daily out and back from Workington Central. From 1 September 1908 this was extended, on Saturdays only, to Great Broughton and Linefoot, making those outposts qualify as stations having had a publicly advertised passenger service. That experiment failed, as they disappeared from the timetable in December of that year, leaving Seaton as the only Northern extension station with a public passenger service. Both Great Broughton and Linefoot stations remained open for goods traffic.

The W&CJR ran many workmen's trains. Three collieries were served by the Northern Extension - Camerton, Buckhill and Alice Pit. No source lists any station, halt or workmen's service to this last, which was at the northern end of the line near Linefoot Junction. The 1920 Working Time Table lists Alice Pit, but shows no booked services of any description.

Camerton Colliery Halt and Buckhill Colliery Halt both had workmen's services at some point, but they are not mentioned in the May 1920 Working Time Table. Indeed, Camerton Colliery is not mentioned at all.

The 1920 Working Time Table shows no Goods (as opposed to mineral) trains or "Through goods" trains booked to call at or pass Great Broughton in either direction.

== Rundown and closure ==
The West Cumberland iron and steel industry was heavily dependent on supplies of coke from the Northumberland and Durham coalfields. The Northern Extension allowed "a large proportion" of this traffic to be routed away from Maryport and the coastal line. Likewise the short chord between Workington Bridge and Cloffocks Junction allowed Durham coke traffic to reach the furnaces via Cockermouth then the C&WJR. These must have suffered a significant decline, as by 1920 there were just two booked mineral workings each way each weekday between Linefoot and Workington through Great Broughton. It is therefore no surprise that the line north of Buckhill Colliery closed on 1 September 1921, closing Great Broughton and its residual goods traffic with it.

The final stationmaster at Great Broughton was Joseph W Allason who retired, aged 78, on closure of the station after 42 years service.

== Afterlife ==
The trtack was lifted before the Second World War. By 2013 the trackbed through the station site could be traced on satellite images.

Preceding station	Disused railways	Following station
Buckhill Colliery Halt; Line and station closed	Cleator and Workington Junction Railway; Northern Extension	Linefoot; Line and station closed

== See also ==
- Whitehaven, Cleator and Egremont Railway
- Cockermouth and Workington Railway
