= Broughton, Cumbria =

Civil parish in Cumbria, England

Coordinates: 54.67°N 03.44°W

Broughton
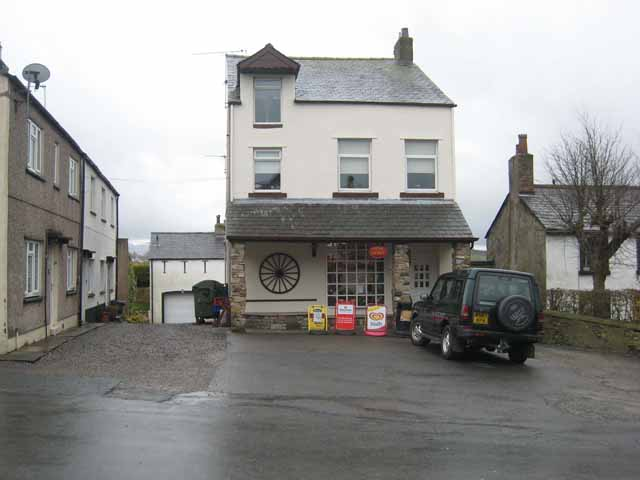
- Great Broughton Post Office

- Location in Allerdale Location within Cumbria
- Population: 1,704 (2011)
- OS grid reference: NY075315
- Civil parish: Broughton
- Unitary authority: Cumberland
- Ceremonial county: Cumbria
- Region: North West
- Country: England
- Sovereign state: United Kingdom
- Post town: COCKERMOUTH
- Postcode district: CA13
- Dialling code: 01900
- Police: Cumbria
- Fire: Cumbria
- Ambulance: North West
- UK Parliament: Penrith and Solway

Broughton is a civil parish in Cumbria, England, consisting of Great Broughton and Little Broughton. It is located on the River Derwent, about 6 miles (9.7 km) east of Workington and 3 miles (4.8 km) west of Cockermouth. According to the 2001 census it had a population of 1,727, decreasing slightly to 1,704 at the 2011 Census.

== Governance ==
Broughton is in the parliamentary constituency of Penrith and Solway. Markus Campbell-Savours, a member of the Labour Party, is the Member of Parliament.

For Local Government purposes it is in the Cumberland unitary authority area.

It was previously in the Broughton St Bridget's electoral ward of Allerdale Borough Council. This ward stretched north to Bridekirk with a total population at the 2011 Census of 4,178. Broughton was also part of the Dearham and Broughton Ward of Cumbria County Council.

The village also has its own parish council; Broughton Parish Council which covers Great & Little Broughton.

== See also ==
- Listed buildings in Broughton, Cumbria
