= Listed buildings in Broughton Moor =

Broughton Moor is a civil parish in the Cumberland district in Cumbria, England. It contains three listed buildings that are recorded in the National Heritage List for England. Both the listed buildings are designated at Grade II, the lowest of the three grades, which is applied to "buildings of national importance and special interest". The parish contains the village of Broughton Moor and is otherwise rural. The listed buildings consist of a milestone, a church, and a war memorial in the churchyard.

== Buildings ==
Name and location	Photograph	Date	Notes
Milestone; 54.69416°N 3.43046°W	—	Late 18th or early 19th century	The milestone was provided for the Cockermouth to Maryport Turnpike road. It is in stone with a rounded top and has a curved face with a cast iron plate. The plate is inscribed with the distances in miles to Cockermouth Court House and to Maryport Market Place.
St Columba's Church; 54.68669°N 3.46964°W		1905	Designed by W. D. Caroe, it is in calciferous sandstone on a chamfered plinth and has a green slate roof with coped gables and cross finials. The church consists of a nave and a chancel, with a south tower incorporating a porch. The porch has a round-headed arch, above which is a lancet window, and an open bell stage with segmental arches. On the top is a spiked weathervane. The windows have round heads.
War memorial 54.68660°N 3.46962°W		1921	The war memorial is in the churchyard of St Columba's Church. It is in grey granite, and consists of a Latin cross on a tapering four-sided plinth on a single-stepped square base. On the centre of the cross-head is carved a wreath in relief. The plinth carries inscriptions and the names of those lost in the two World Wars.
