= Seaton railway station (Cumbria) =

Disused railway station in Cumbria, England

Seaton
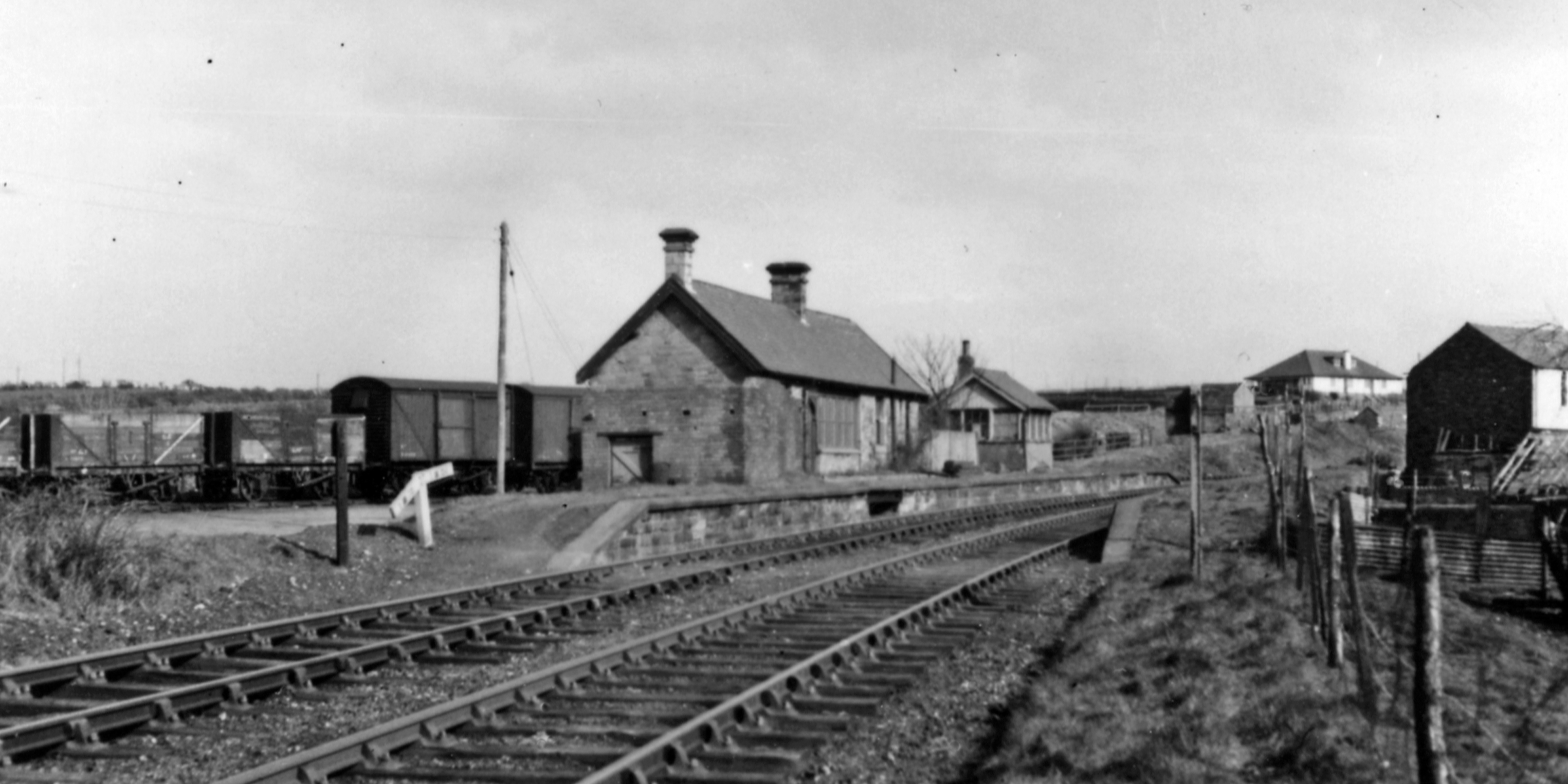
- Seaton station, 1951.

General information
- Location: Seaton, near Workington, Cumberland; England
- Coordinates: 54.6621°N 3.5234°W
- Grid reference: NY018307
- Platforms: 2

Other information
- Status: Disused

History
- Original company: Cleator and Workington Junction Railway

Key dates
- 4 January 1888: Opened
- July 1897: Closed
- February 1907: Reopened
- February 1922: Closed to passengers
- 6 April 1962: Closed completely
- 4 June 1992: Line through the station closed
Location
- Location within the former Allerdale Borough Location within Cumbria

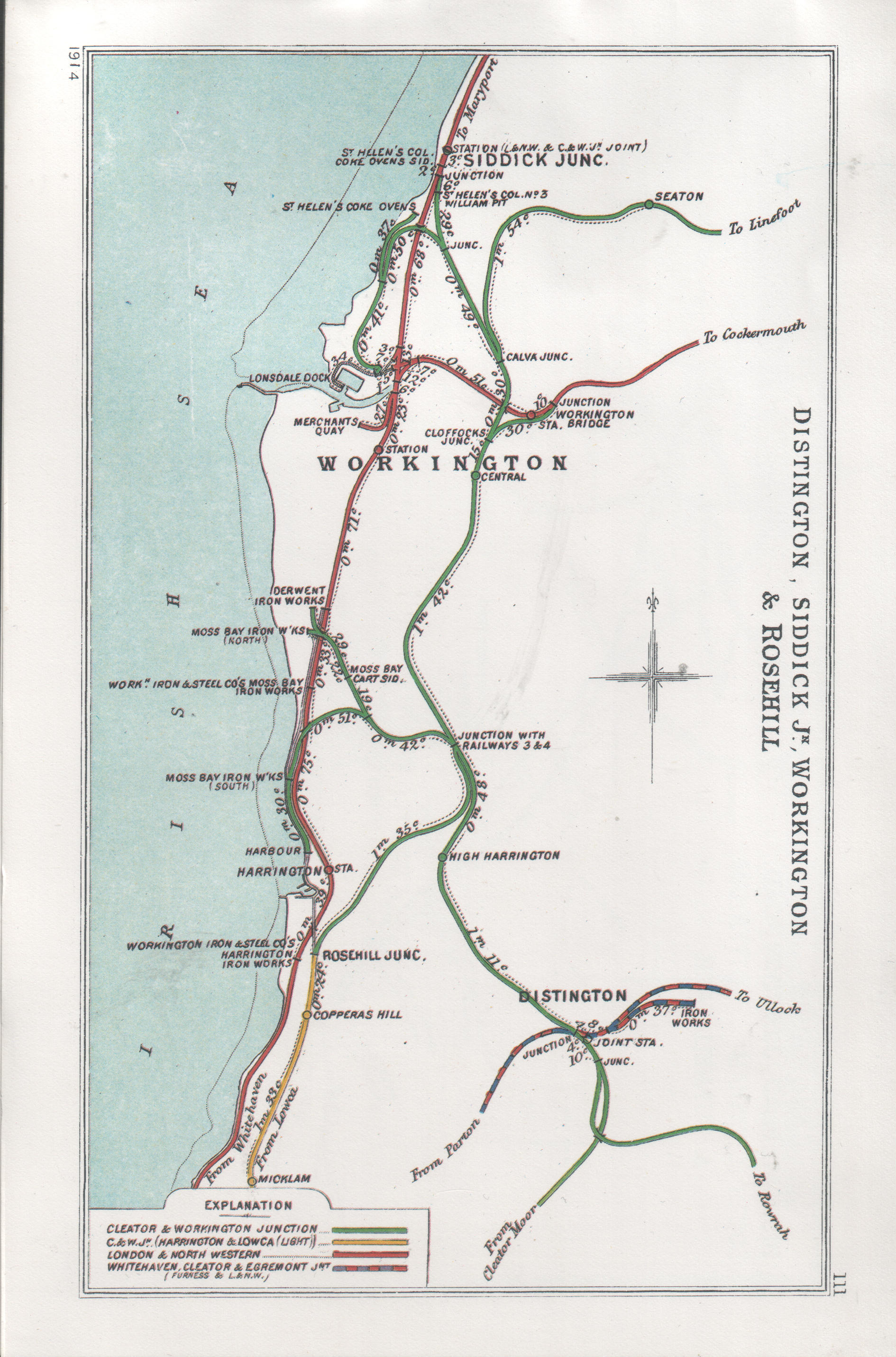
A 1914 Railway Clearing House Junction Diagram showing the complex network which existed in the Workington area

Seaton railway station served the village of Seaton, near Workington in Cumberland (now in Cumbria), England.

The station was opened by the Cleator and Workington Junction Railway (C&WJR) in 1888 on its new "Northern Extension" from Calva Junction on the northern edge of Workington to the Maryport and Carlisle Railway's Derwent Branch at Linefoot. The C&WJR built this 7-mile-30-chain-long (11.9 km) line to connect the C&WJR with Carlisle and beyond. The line was double track from Workington to Seaton, then single to Linefoot Junction.

Most stations on C&WJR lines had heavy industrial neighbours, such as ironworks next to Cleator Moor West, or served primarily industrial workforces, such as Keekle Colliers' Platform. Seaton, however, was a fairly isolated country village.

== History ==
The C&WJR was built in the late 1870s, being one of the fruits of the rapid industrialisation of West Cumberland in the second half of the nineteenth century, specifically being born as a reaction to oligopolistic behaviour by the London and North Western and Whitehaven, Cleator and Egremont Railways.

It was originally intended to drive the line northwards across country to meet the Caledonian Railway and cross into Scotland by the Solway Viaduct, but an accommodation was made with the LNWR leading to the intended northern extension being greatly watered down to three lines:

- a 1 mile 54 chains (2.7 km) link from Workington Central to Siddick Junction which opened in 1880
- a 30 chains (0.60 km) link from Cloffocks Junction to the CKPR line which opened in March 1885, and
- the "Northern Extension" through Seaton to Linefoot Junction.

All lines in the area were primarily aimed at mineral traffic, notably iron ore, coal and limestone, none more so than the Northern Extension, which passed through open country. Passenger services were provided calling at Seaton, but they were so unsuccessful they petered out in 1922. The C&WJR earned the local name "The Track of the Ironmasters".

The founding Act of Parliament of June 1878 confirmed the company's agreement with the Furness Railway that the latter would operate the line for one third of the receipts.

All C&WJR's lines were heavily graded. Almost all of the first three miles of the Northern Extension from Calva Junction through Seaton was rising at 1 in 70. This favoured loaded coal and coke trains.

The Northern Extension became part of the London, Midland and Scottish Railway at the Grouping of 1923.

Like any business tied to one or few industries, the C&WJR was particularly at the mercy of trade fluctuations and technological change. The Cumberland iron industry led the charge in the nineteenth century, but became less and less competitive as time passed and local ore became worked out and harder to win, taking the fortunes of the railway with it. The peak year was 1909, when the C&WJR handled 1,644,514 tons of freight. Ominously for the line, that tonnage was down to just over 800,000 by 1922, bringing receipts of £83,349, compared with passenger fares totalling £6,570.

The high water mark for tonnage on the C&WJR was 1909, the high water mark for progress was 1913, with the opening of the Harrington and Lowca line for passenger traffic. A chronology of the line's affairs from 1876 to 1992 has almost no entries before 1914 which fail to include "opened" or "commenced". After 1918 the position was reversed, when the litany of step-by-step closures and withdrawals was relieved only by a control cabin and a signalbox being erected at Harrington Junction in 1919.

== Services ==
C&WJR passenger trains consisted of antiquated Furness stock hauled largely by elderly Furness engines referred to as "rolling ruins" by one author after a footplate ride in 1949.

No Sunday passenger service was ever provided on any C&WJR line.

The Northern Extension had three stations: Seaton, Great Broughton and Linefoot, the last being run jointly with the Maryport and Carlisle Railway (MCR). A passenger service was provided to Seaton over two periods: 1888 to 1897 and 1907 to 1922. The service in the first period appears to have been out and back over the 2 miles 19 chains (3.6 km) to Workington Central. This was reduced to Wednesdays and Saturdays only (Workington Market Days) from March 1891 and to Saturdays only from January 1894, being withdrawn completely in July 1897.

The company tried again ten years later, with what appears to have been another daily out and back from Workington Central. From September 1908 this was extended, on Saturdays only, to Great Broughton and Linefoot Junction, making those outposts qualify as stations having had a publicly advertised passenger service. That experiment failed, as they disappeared from the timetable in December of that year, leaving Seaton as the only Northern extension station with a public passenger service.

On 2 June 1913 a new public passenger service was opened from Lowca to Workington Central, aimed mainly but not exclusively at workers travelling to and from the remote Harrington No 10 Colliery and associated bi-products works on the clifftop at Lowca. One of these trains ran beyond Workington to Seaton and a second one did so on Saturday afternoons. Southbound ("Down") the early morning train started at Seaton and one other made an out and back trip from Seaton to Workington, rather than a through train. All others plied between Lowca and Workington Central only. This remained the case in 1919. The Lowca service continued to 1926, but the Seaton experiment ended altogether in February 1922.

The W&CJR ran many workmen's trains. Three collieries were served by the Northern Extension - Camerton, Buckhill and Alice Pit. No source lists any station, halt or workmen's service to this last, which was at the northern end of the line near Linefoot Junction. The 1920 Working Time Table lists Alice Pit, but shows no booked services of any description.

Camerton Colliery Halt and Buckhill Colliery Halt both had workmen's services at some point, but they are not mentioned in the May 1920 Working Time Table. Indeed, Camerton Colliery is not mentioned at all.

The 1920 Working Time Table shows no Goods (as opposed to mineral) trains or "Through goods" trains booked to call or pass Seaton in either direction.

== Rundown and closure ==
The West Cumberland iron and steel industry was heavily dependent on supplies of coke from the Northumberland and Durham coalfields. The Northern Extension allowed "a large proportion" of this traffic to be routed away from Maryport and the coastal line. Likewise the short chord between Workington Bridge and Cloffocks Junction allowed Durham coke traffic to reach the furnaces via Cockermouth then the C&WJR. These must have suffered a significant decline, as by 1920 there were just two booked mineral workings each way each weekday between Linefoot Junction and Workington through Seaton. There was also a daily booked mineral train from Workington to Buckhill Colliery which passed through Seaton. It is therefore no surprise that the line north of Buckhill Colliery closed on 1 September 1921, leaving Seaton station "stranded" on what was effectively a long siding.

Given this early decline it is remarkable that Seaton station remained open for goods traffic until 6 April 1962 and even more remarkable that the line through Seaton went on to outlive all other former C&WJR metals by some years. Buckhill Colliery's output and Seaton station's slender goods traffic appear to be the sole reasons for keeping the remnant of the Northern Extension open after 1922, though Camerton Colliery appears to have still been in production until 1931. Buckhill Colliery closed in 1932, though even here it is questionable how much rail borne coal traffic it generated after 1924 when an aerial ropeway was installed taking its coals over the Derwent to William Pit at Great Clifton.

The branch's longevity came about because the Admiralty, attracted by a remote area with rail and sea access, chose part of the site of Buckhill Colliery and the surrounding area to build a rail-served armaments depot which opened in 1938 and closed in 1992, taking the line with it. After the closure of the C&WJR south of Workington Central in 1965 all trains through Seaton to the armaments depot travelled south from Siddick Junction past Calva Junction, where they reversed towards Seaton.

== Enthusiasts' specials ==
An enthusiasts' special passed through Seaton on 5 September 1954, travelling to the then limit of public railway at Buckhill, the only one to traverse the C&WJR using main line passenger stock.

The next such train to traverse any C&WJR metals was the "Solway Ranger" brakevan special on 7 May 1966, which repeated the run through Seaton to Buckhill, with a third and final such trip on 2 March 1968

== Afterlife ==
By 2015 the trackbed through Seaton was part of the West Cumbria Cycle Network.

| Preceding station | Disused railways | Following station |
|---|---|---|
| Workington Central; Line and station closed | Cleator and Workington Junction Railway; Northern Extension | Camerton Colliery Halt; Line and station closed |

== See also ==
- Whitehaven, Cleator and Egremont Railway
- Cockermouth and Workington Railway
