= Listed buildings in Broughton, Cumbria =

Broughton is a civil parish in the Cumberland district in Cumbria, England. It contains four listed buildings that are recorded in the National Heritage List for England. All the listed buildings are designated at Grade II, the lowest of the three grades, which is applied to "buildings of national importance and special interest". The parish contains the villages of Great Broughton and Little Broughton, and is otherwise rural. The listed buildings consist of houses, a war memorial, and a farmhouse and farm building.

== Buildings ==
Name and location	Photograph	Date	Notes
17 West End; 54.66763°N 3.43725°W	—	Late 17th or early 18th century	Originally a house, later altered and used for other purposes, it is roughcast with a green slate roof. The building has two storeys and three bays, a central door with a plain surround, and sash windows with plain reveals.
Pennybridge and barn 54.66366°N 3.43547°W	—	Late 18th century	A farmhouse and attached barn that are stuccoed and have tiled roofs. The house has two storeys and three bays, quoins and sash windows with architraves. On the front is a gabled porch and a door, also with an architrave. The barn, to the left, has a blocked segmental arch and a projecting cart entrance.
Scott House; 54.66812°N 3.43481°W	—	Early 19th century	A roughcast house with a green slate roof, in two storeys and four bays. Above the doorway is a cornice hood, and the windows are sashes.
Great Broughton War Memorial; 54.67161°N 3.43526°W	—	1920	The war memorial is in the churchyard of Christ Church, Great Broughton. It is in slate and consists of a stele-like panel on a four-sided plinth and a single-stepped base. The panel has a pointed top, a carved laurel wreath, inscriptions, and the names of those lost in both World Wars.
