= Camerton Colliery Halt railway station =

Disused railway station in Cumbria, England

Camerton Colliery Halt

General information
- Location: Camerton, near Cockermouth, Cumberland; England
- Coordinates: 54.6631°N 3.4964°W
- Grid reference: NY029309

Other information
- Status: Disused

History
- Original company: Cleator and Workington Junction Railway

Key dates
- 24 March 1887: Opened for workmen's trains
- By October 1923: Closed
Location
- Location within the former Allerdale Borough Location within Cumbria

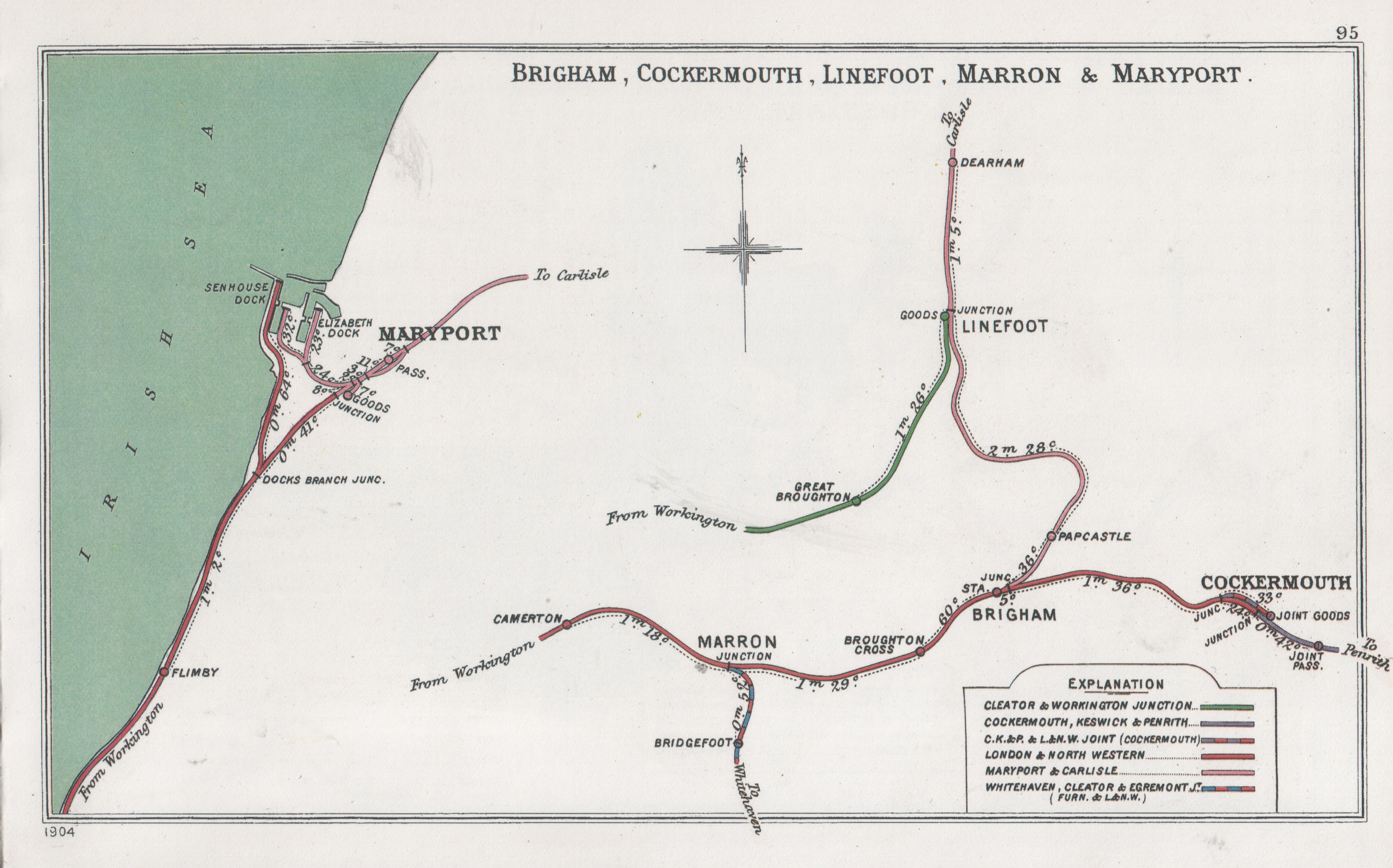
A 1904 Railway Clearing House Junction Diagram showing railways in the vicinity of the halt

Camerton Colliery Halt railway station was an unadvertised halt for workers at one or both of the collieries at Camerton, near Cockermouth in Cumberland (now in Cumbria), England.

== Location ==
The halt is listed in the 1904 Railway Clearing House Handbook of Stations as "Camerton Colliery". It also appears in three authoritative works, but does not appear in Jowett's railway atlas, nor can it be identified on any Ordnance Survey Map, although both collieries and their connections to Camerton's railways are plain to see.

Camerton No. 1 colliery was situated in the valley bottom, north of the river, east of the Cockermouth and Workington Railway station and near that company's line to Cockermouth, to which it was connected. It appears to have closed in the early 1930s.

Camerton No. 2 colliery was situated to the north west of the village, on higher ground above the valley next to the road to Seaton, almost 1 km from No.1 Colliery by foot. In February 1890 it was connected to the Cleator and Workington Junction Railway's (C&WJR) "Northern Extension" which ran between Workington Central and Linefoot via Seaton (Cumbria). The specialist work on the line and the specialist work on unadvertised stations agree that the C&WJR provided the halt. The former does not give a location except in a large scale map, but the latter give its map reference as NY037313 which is where the Flimby Road crosses that company's line, some 650 metres east of No.2 Pit, but slightly nearer No.1 Pit.

The line's specialist work omits the halt from its Track Diagrams.

== Opening and closure ==
The halt opened on 24 March 1887, but its closure is acknowledged as unclear. As it was never publicly advertised standard works such as Bradshaw's Guide are silent. The C&WJR's 1920 Working Time Table (WTT) makes no mention of the colliery or the halt. What appears to be the only on line mention of Camerton's collieries appears to suggest that Camerton No.2 was abandoned in 1911, which would explain it not being in the WTT or on OS maps from the 1930s.

== Services ==
Access to a C&WJR WTT for any date between 1890 and 1910 would give clear evidence of the halt's location and services.

== History ==
The C&WJR was built in the late 1870s, being one of the fruits of the rapid industrialisation of West Cumberland in the second half of the nineteenth century, specifically being born as a reaction to oligopolistic behaviour by the London and North Western and Whitehaven, Cleator and Egremont Railways.

It was originally intended to drive the line northwards across country to meet the Caledonian Railway and cross into Scotland by the Solway Viaduct, but an accommodation was made with the LNWR leading to the intended northern extension being greatly watered down to three lines:

- a 1 mile 54 chains (2.7 km) link from Workington Central to Siddick Junction which opened in 1880
- a 30 chains (0.60 km) link from Cloffocks Junction to the CKPR line which opened in March 1885, and
- the 6 miles 30 chains (10.3 km) "Northern Extension" on the high ground past Camerton to Linefoot.

All lines in the area were primarily aimed at mineral traffic, notably iron ore, coal and limestone, none more so than the Northern Extension, which passed through open country. Passenger services were provided calling at Great Broughton, but they were so unsuccessful they petered out after a mere two months. The C&WJR earned the local name "The Track of the Ironmasters".

The founding Act of Parliament of June 1878 confirmed the company's agreement with the Furness Railway that the latter would operate the line for one third of the receipts.

All C&WJR's lines were heavily graded. Almost all of the first three miles of the Northern Extension from Calva Junction past Camerton was rising at 1 in 70, with gentler slopes thereafter to the extension's summit at Great Broughton This favoured loaded coal and coke trains heading for Workington..

The Northern Extension became part of the London, Midland and Scottish Railway at the Grouping of 1923.

Like any business tied to one or few industries, the C&WJR was particularly at the mercy of trade fluctuations and technological change. The Cumberland iron industry led the charge in the nineteenth century, but became less and less competitive as time passed and local ore became worked out and harder to win, taking the fortunes of the railway with it. The peak year was 1909, when the C&WJR handled 1,644,514 tons of freight. Ominously for the line, that tonnage was down to just over 800,000 by 1922, bringing receipts of £83,349, compared with passenger fares totalling £6,570.

The high water mark for tonnage on the C&WJR was 1909, the high water mark for progress was 1913, with the opening of the Harrington and Lowca line for passenger traffic. A chronology of the line's affairs from 1876 to 1992 has almost no entries before 1914 which fail to include "opened" or "commenced". After 1918 the position was reversed, when the litany of step-by-step closures and withdrawals was relieved only by a control cabin and a signalbox being erected at Harrington Junction in 1919.

The line north of Buckhill was closed in 1921 and subsequently lifted. Buckhill colliery closed in 1932, depriving the line of purpose. Nevertheless, it became a remarkable survivor, because the Admiralty, attracted by a remote area with rail and sea access, chose part of the site of Buckhill Colliery and the surrounding area to build a rail-served armaments depot which opened in 1938 and closed in 1992, taking the line with it. After the closure of the C&WJR south of Workington Central in 1965 all trains past the site of the halt to the armaments depot travelled south from Siddick Junction past Calva Junction, where they reversed towards Seaton.

== Afterlife ==
By 2013 the trackbed through the site of the halt was a public off-road trail.

Preceding station	Disused railways	Following station
Seaton (Cumbria); Line and station closed	Cleator and Workington Junction Railway; Northern Extension	Buckhill Colliery Halt; Line and station closed

== See also ==
- Whitehaven, Cleator and Egremont Railway
- Cockermouth and Workington Railway
