= Tallentire =

Village in Cumbria, England

Coordinates: 54.70389°N 3.41978°W

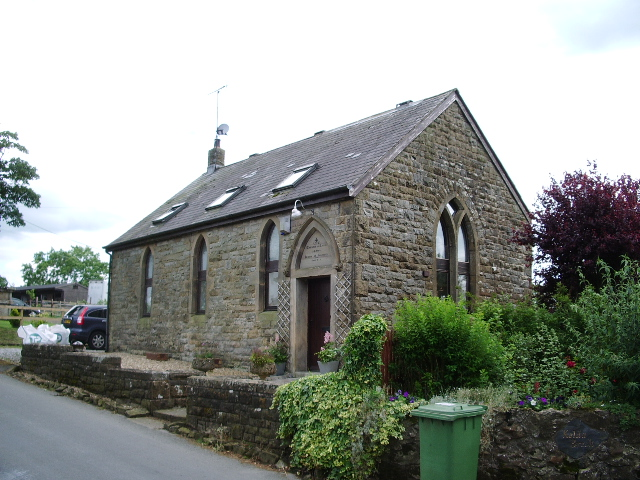
- Former chapel, Tallentire

- Location in Allerdale Location within Cumbria
- OS grid reference: NY108352
- Civil parish: Bridekirk
- Unitary authority: Cumberland
- Ceremonial county: Cumbria
- Region: North West
- Country: England
- Sovereign state: United Kingdom
- Post town: COCKERMOUTH
- Postcode district: CA13
- Dialling code: 01900
- Police: Cumbria
- Fire: Cumbria
- Ambulance: North West
- UK Parliament: Penrith and Solway

Tallentire is a village and former civil parish, now in the parish of Bridekirk, in the Cumberland district of Cumbria, England. It is about 2.5 miles (4.0 km) north of Cockermouth. The village is located just outside the Lake District National Park. In 1931 the parish had a population of 184.

== Toponymy ==
The name Tallentire is one of Brittonic origins. The first element tāl means "brow, front, end", and the terminal element *tīr means "land" (Welsh tâl and tir). Unusually, "Tallentire" appears to contain a definite article in the form of -en, leading to the proposition that *[h]ïn was a definite article in the Brittonic of the North, although ï[r] (Welsh y; see Penyghent, Penicuik) is considerably more common. The meaning of the name may be "end of the land".

== Governance ==
Tallentire is part of the Penrith and Solway constituency for UK parliament.

For Local Government purposes it's in the Cumberland unitary authority area.

It was previously part of the Broughton St Bridget's electoral ward of Allerdale Borough Council. This ward stretched north to Bridekirk with a total population at the 2011 Census of 4,178. Tallentire was part of the Dearham and Broughton Ward of Cumbria County Council.

Tallentire was formerly a township in Bridekirk parish, from 1866 Tallentire was a civil parish in its own right until it was abolished on 1 April 1934 and merged with Bridekirk.
