= Bridekirk =

Village in Cumbria, England

Coordinates: 54.689°N 3.369°W

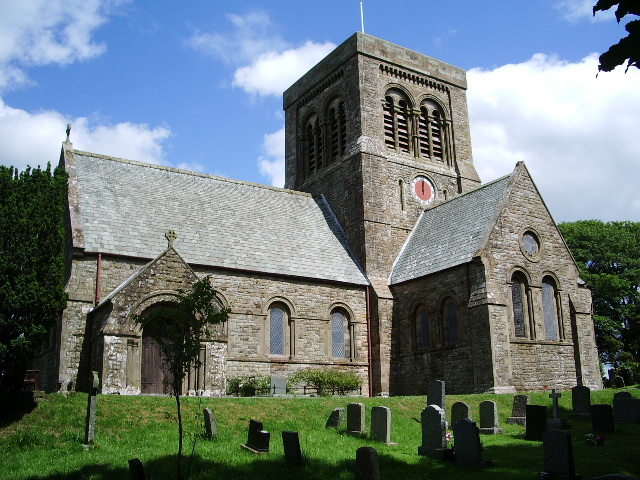
- St. Bridget's Church, Bridekirk

- Location in Allerdale, Cumbria Location within Cumbria
- Population: 735 (2011)
- OS grid reference: NY117335
- Civil parish: Bridekirk
- Unitary authority: Cumberland
- Ceremonial county: Cumbria
- Region: North West
- Country: England
- Sovereign state: United Kingdom
- Post town: COCKERMOUTH
- Postcode district: CA13
- Dialling code: 01900
- Police: Cumbria
- Fire: Cumbria
- Ambulance: North West
- UK Parliament: Penrith and Solway

Bridekirk is a village and civil parish in the Cumberland district in the county of Cumbria, England. It is around 3.2 kilometres (2 mi) north of the Derwent river and about the same distance from the nearest large town of Cockermouth just south of the river. Bridekirk is just outside the Lake District National Park (1 mile (1.6 km) by road) and is not far from the Maryport and Carlisle Railway.

Bridekirk ecclesiastical parish had in 1811 a population of 1552 persons. It has since been altered in area by the formation of separate parishes:

1. Great Broughton, in 1863, which included Ribton
2. Christ Church, Cockermouth, in 1865, was given part of the township of Papcastle
3. Broughton Moor parish in 1898 was formed with Little Broughton

In addition to the township of Bridekirk itself, Bridekirk ecclesiastical parish now only contains Papcastle, Dovenby, and Tallentire.

The civil parish of Bridekirk comprises only Bridekirk, Tallentire and Dovenby villages.

== Demography ==
According to the United Kingdom Census 2001, the Civil Parish of Bridekirk (which covers a larger area than Bridekirk village) has a population of 636 and 246 households in total.

There are 335 economically active people in Bridekirk Parish (between the ages of 16 and 74) and 125 economically inactive people in the same age bracket.

== Toponymy ==
Bridekirk is "the church of St Bride" (St Bridget). Kirkja is Old Norse for "church".

== History ==
The earliest measure of Bridekirk's population was after the 1800 Census Act when the government of Great Britain wanted to find the overall population of England, Wales and Scotland. The 1801 census found the total population to be 1400. The first records of housing numbers were in 1831, when there were 424 houses in Bridekirk. From 1851 to 1881, there was a sharp decrease in the amount of housing, with over 500 in 1851 and only 26 houses in 1881.

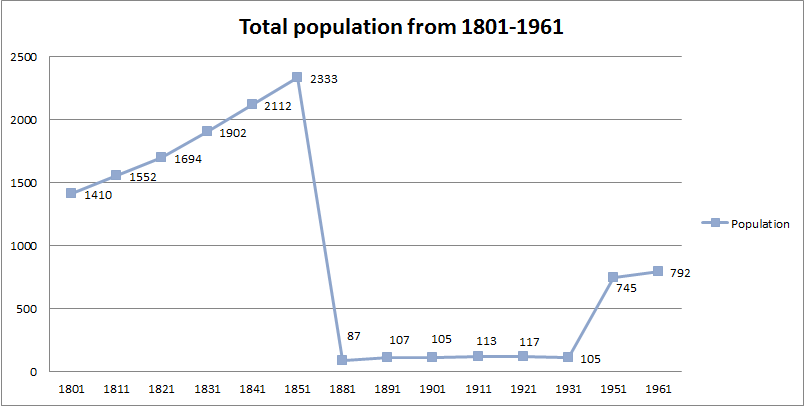
Population of Bridekirk from 1801 to 1961.

Bridekirk has had three major boundary changes in its history. The first was in 1887 when the town of Dovenby was added to the parish. The second and third changes were in 1934 when Bridekirk's boundaries were made smaller by two towns being excluded from Bridekirk parish.

The reason for the appearance of a sudden decline in the total population from 1851 to 1881 is because the census area for Bridekirk changed from including other townships in the area to smaller civil parish sub-districts. Rather than the townships that were included under Bridekirk's parish, the recorded population for Bridekirk was just the township of Bridekirk.

== Employment ==
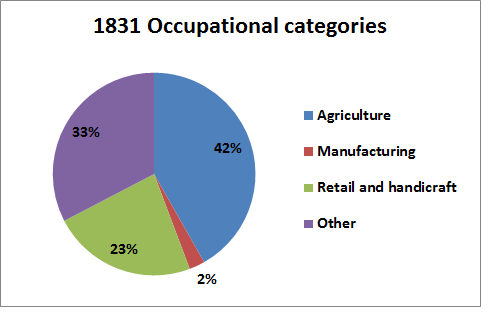
Occupations in Bridekirk in 1831

The pie chart on the right shows the earliest available information on the proportion of Bridekirk's workforce in each of four broad categories. The Agricultural bracket, being the largest group, included both large-scale and small-scale farmers and agricultural labourers. Retail and handicrafts included workers employed in small businesses producing and selling goods. The manufacturing category is small because the category mainly includes large-scale production and although 1831 was in the period of the Industrial Revolution, Bridekirk, being a small town, did not have a high number of factories or a large workforce for large-scale production.

Bridekirk had a much larger production and agricultural sectors compared to today's employment in Bridekirk. However, as shown above under the "Demography" section above, nowadays, around two-thirds of the population work in the service sector, whereas in 1831 that was less than a third of the population, shown in the "other" category.

=== Modern times ===
There are two main categories of employment in Bridekirk Parish:

- Extractive and manufacturing industries = 33.7% (113 people)
- Service industries = 66.5% (223 people)

Other categories of employment are:

- Managerial and professional occupations = 55.8% (187 people)
- Small employers/self employed = 22.3% (75 people)
- Lower supervisory and technical occupations = 6.5% (22 people)
- Unemployed = 2% (7 people)

== St Bridget's Church ==
A wooden church had existed here since ancient times, but was replaced with a stone church in 1130. Before the Dissolution of the Monasteries in the 16th century, St Bridget's Church was owned by Gisborough Priory in the North Riding of Yorkshire. Following the deterioration of the building over the years, a new church was built by the architects Corey and Ferguson in 1868, alongside the ruins of the chancel of the old church. Incorporated in the new church are several elements of the old church: the tympanum and archway of the south door, the door in the south transept, and the former chancel arch. The new church is in neo-Norman style.

Inside the church, the 12th-century font is probably a remaining feature of the original church. For a Norman sculpture in the United Kingdom, it is in very good condition. The font was carved by Richard of Durham with a runic inscription, which translates as "Richard he me wrought, and to this beauty me brought." The font has interlaced carvings and portrays the story of Adam and Eve and also shows Christ's baptism.

Outside the church, near the old chapel, there are a number of ancient tombstones and coffin lids.

St Bridget's was not simply an ordinary country church in medieval times, but was in fact a very important and ancient Minster Church, which would be in receipt of significant gifts.

== Notable residents ==
The 17th century MP Sir Joseph Williamson was born in Bridekirk, where his father was the vicar.

The 18th century poet Thomas Tickell was born at Bridekirk, also the son of the town's vicar.

== Governance ==
Bridekirk is part of the Penrith and Solway constituency for the UK Parliament.

For Local Government purposes it's in the Cumberland unitary authority area.

It was previously part of the Broughton St Bridget's electoral ward of Allerdale Borough Council. This ward stretched north to Bridekirk with a total population at the 2011 Census of 4,178. Bridekirk was part of the Dearham and Broughton Ward of Cumbria County Council.

Bridekirk Parish Council meets once a month in Bridekirk Dovenby School, normally on the second Thursday of the month at 7:30 pm, with the MP for Workington, the Cumbria County Councillor and the Allerdale Borough Councillors invited and attending when possible. However, the Parish Council has its own Councillors most of whom always attend the meetings.

Proceedings of meetings are available on the Parish Council website.

== Transport ==
Within the Bridekirk area the only public transport was a bus service, but recent budget cuts have led to this being discontinued. Buses still run past Dovenby on the main road, and near to Bridekirk on the main Carlisle road.

The nearest main road is the A595 which goes directly north-east to Carlisle, approximately 24.7 miles (39.8 km) from Bridekirk. For a public transport route, there is a bus route from Cockermouth to Maryport and then it takes approximately 45 minutes for the old Maryport and Carlisle Railway route to get from Maryport to Carlisle.

== Climate ==
Climate data for Bridekirk, Cumbria, England
Month	Jan	Feb	Mar	Apr	May	Jun	Jul	Aug	Sep	Oct	Nov	Dec	Year
Mean daily maximum °C (°F)	6 (43)	7 (45)	9 (48)	11 (52)	15 (59)	17 (63)	19 (66)	19 (66)	16 (61)	13 (55)	9 (48)	7 (45)	12 (54)
Mean daily minimum °C (°F)	2 (36)	2 (36)	3 (37)	4 (39)	6 (43)	9 (48)	12 (54)	11 (52)	9 (48)	7 (45)	4 (39)	2 (36)	6 (43)
Average precipitation cm (inches)	9.39 (3.70)	8 (3.1)	7.33 (2.89)	5.41 (2.13)	5.62 (2.21)	6.38 (2.51)	6.14 (2.42)	7.15 (2.81)	8.32 (3.28)	11.09 (4.37)	9.85 (3.88)	10.47 (4.12)	95.15 (37.42)
Source: www.bing.com

== See also ==
- Listed buildings in Bridekirk
