= Highgate Platform railway station =

Disused railway station in Cumbria

Highgate Platform

General information
- Location: Penrith Rural District, Cumberland; England
- Coordinates: 54.6251°N 2.9912°W
- Grid reference: NY361260
- Platforms: 2

Other information
- Status: Disused

History
- Original company: Cockermouth, Keswick and Penrith Railway
- Post-grouping: London, Midland and Scottish Railway

Key dates
- 17 August 1908: Opened
- 1 January 1929: Closed
Location

Highgate Platform railway station served schoolchildren in the isolated area of Highgate between Keswick and Penrith, in the historical area of Cumberland, England, from 1908 to 1929 on the Cockermouth, Keswick and Penrith Railway.

== History ==
The station was opened on 17 August 1908 by the Cockermouth, Keswick and Penrith Railway. It was located in a sparsely populated area about 3 miles (5 km) east of the village of Threlkeld and 2 miles (3 km) west of Troutbeck. It was on both sides of the bridge at Highgate Close. It was not intended for general public use, thus London and North Western Railway did not display the name signs on the platforms. Nearby was Highgate signal box, which opened before the station in 1892. Non-school use trains occasionally called at the station; social trips and a honeymoon trip were examples. The bus service introduced in 1928 rendered this station obsolete and it closed at the end of the December term in the following year, although official closure took place on 1 January 1929.

The word "Platform" was used as the Scottish equivalent of "Halt" and that was presumably its meaning here.

Preceding station	Disused railways	Following station
Threlkeld; Line and station closed	Cockermouth, Keswick and Penrith Railway	Troutbeck; Line and station closed
