= Penruddock =

Village in Cumbria, England

Coordinates: 54.6394°N 2.8847°W

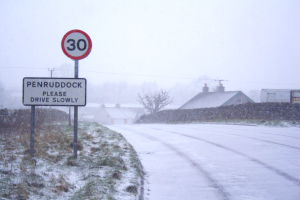
- Penruddock

- Location in Eden, Cumbria Location within Cumbria
- OS grid reference: NY429275
- Civil parish: Hutton
- Unitary authority: Westmorland and Furness
- Ceremonial county: Cumbria
- Region: North West
- Country: England
- Sovereign state: United Kingdom
- Post town: PENRITH
- Postcode district: CA11
- Dialling code: 01768
- Police: Cumbria
- Fire: Cumbria
- Ambulance: North West
- UK Parliament: Westmorland and Lonsdale

Penruddock is a small village in Cumbria, England, 5.5 miles to the west of Penrith. It forms part of the civil parish of Hutton.

== History ==
The name Penruddock is Cumbric. With both red soil and red sandstone in the area to the south, the word Penruddock is likely derived from the word Pen (hill) and a cognate of the Welsh word rhudd (red). Red Hill is also one proposed meaning for the much debated name of Penrith, an area called Redhills now lies between the two.

The village of Penruddock itself is situated over limestone which is visible in many places, with craggy outcrops and a limestone pavement on the eastern boundary, and the remains of an ancient lime burning kiln on the north western boundary. The soil over the limestone is a fairly heavy clay which retains water, with the result that it helps keep vegetation alive during times of drought, but creates very wet conditions for long periods during the winter months.

== Governance ==
Penruddock is in the parliamentary constituency of Westmorland and Lonsdale.

== Transport ==
=== Road ===
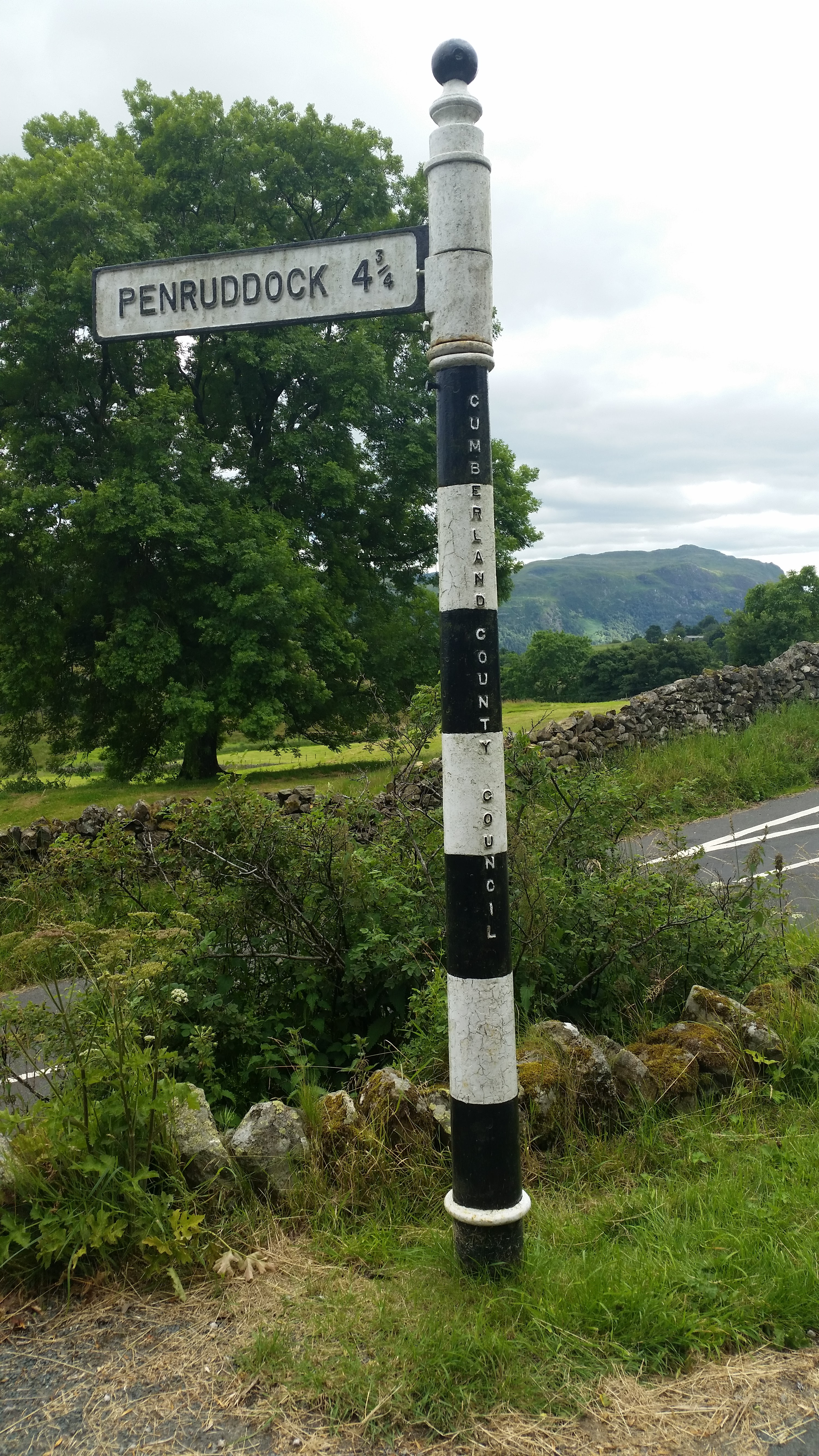
Old sign to Penruddock

Penruddock can be reached by car approximately 5.5 miles (8.9 km) west of Penrith, just to the north of the A66 road.

=== Rail ===
Its railway station on the former Cockermouth, Keswick and Penrith Railway closed in the 1970s and was demolished on 4 March 1997. The closest station is at Penrith.

=== Bus ===
Stagecoach operates the services in the village. 2 routes serve the village. The first one is the X4 to Penrith or to Workington via Keswick and Cockermouth. (Note: Stagecoach route X5 serves the nearby A66 Road to Workington or Penrith.) The second route is the 105 to Greystoke or to Penrith.

== See also ==
- Listed buildings in Hutton, Cumbria
