= Penruddock railway station =

Former railway station in Cumberland, England

Coordinates: 54.6435°N 2.8935°W

Penruddock

General information
- Location: Penruddock, Westmorland and Furness; England
- Platforms: 2

Other information
- Status: Disused

History
- Original company: Cockermouth, Keswick and Penrith Railway
- Pre-grouping: Cockermouth, Keswick and Penrith Railway
- Post-grouping: London, Midland and Scottish Railway; London Midland Region of British Railways

Key dates
- 2 January 1865: Opened
- 6 March 1972: Closed
Location
- Location within the former Eden District Location within Cumbria

Penruddock railway station was situated on the Cockermouth, Keswick and Penrith Railway between Penrith and Cockermouth in Cumberland (now in Cumbria), England. The station served the villages of Penruddock and Motherby. The station opened to passenger traffic on 2 January 1865, and closed on 6 March 1972.

== Sources ==
- Butt, R. V. J. (October 1995). The Directory of Railway Stations: details every public and private passenger station, halt, platform and stopping place, past and present (1st ed.). Sparkford: Patrick Stephens Ltd. ISBN 978-1-85260-508-7. OCLC 60251199. OL 11956311M.
- Robinson, Peter W. (2002). Cumbria's Lost Railways. Catrine: Stenlake Publishing. ISBN 978-1-84033-205-6.

Preceding station	Disused railways	Following station
Troutbeck	Cockermouth, Keswick and Penrith Railway	Blencow
