= Keswick, Cumbria =

Town and civil parish in Cumbria, England

Coordinates: 54°36′03″N 3°08′15″W

Keswick
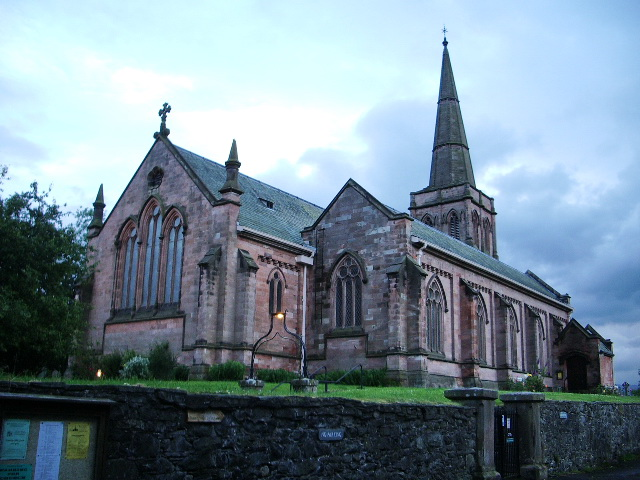
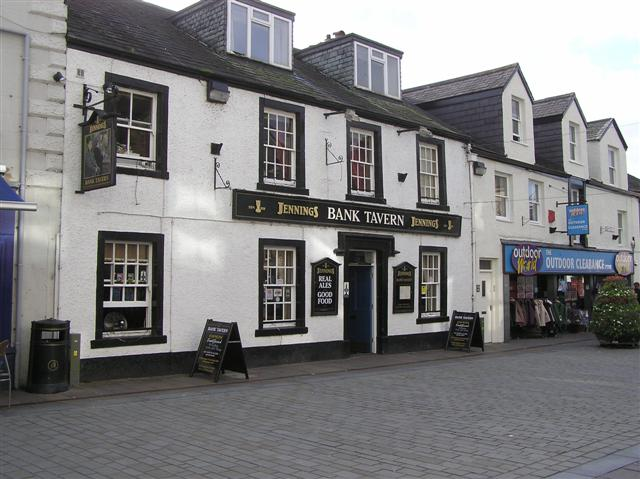
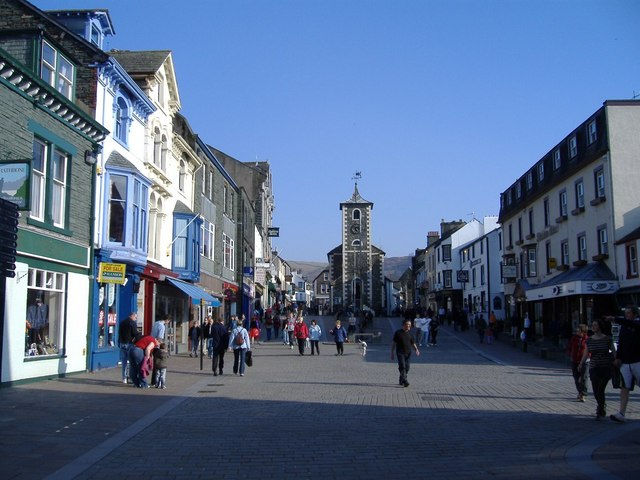
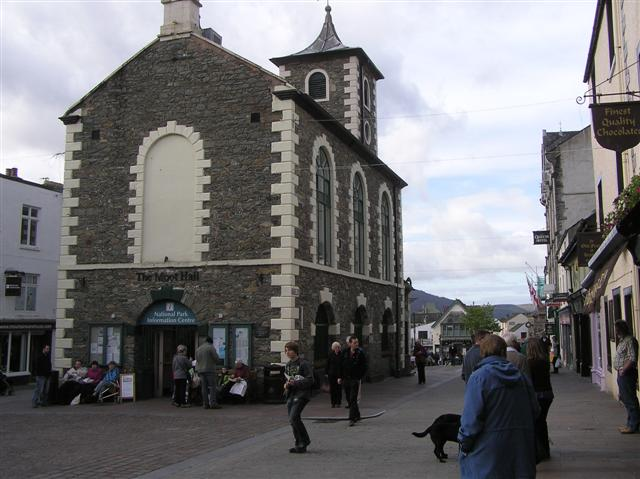
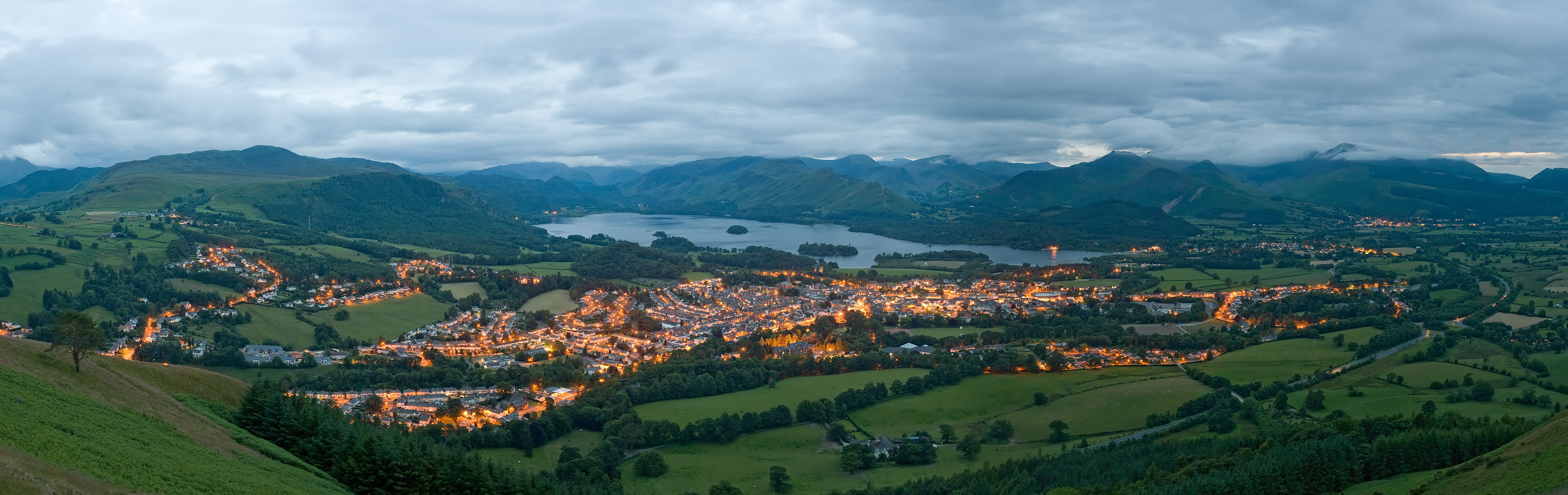

- Location within Cumbria
- Population: 4,658 (Note: To get individual community data, use the query function on table PP002.)
- OS grid reference: NY270233
- Civil parish: Keswick
- Unitary authority: Cumberland
- Ceremonial county: Cumbria
- Region: North West
- Country: England
- Sovereign state: United Kingdom
- Post town: KESWICK
- Postcode district: CA12
- Dialling code: 017687
- Police: Cumbria
- Fire: Cumbria
- Ambulance: North West
- UK Parliament: Penrith and Solway

Keswick (/ˈkɛzɪk/ KEZ-ik) is a market town and civil parish in the Cumberland unitary authority area of Cumbria, England. It lies within the Lake District National Park, just north of Derwentwater and 4 mi (6.4 km) from Bassenthwaite Lake. The parish had a population of 4,658 at the 2021 census.

There is evidence of prehistoric occupation of the area, but the first recorded mention of the town dates from the 13th century, when Edward I of England granted a charter for Keswick's market, which has maintained a continuous 700-year existence. The town was an important mining area and has been known as a holiday centre from the 18th century; tourism has been its principal industry for more than 150 years. Its features include the Moot Hall; a modern theatre, the Theatre by the Lake; one of Britain's oldest surviving cinemas, the Alhambra; and the Keswick Museum and Art Gallery in the town's largest open space, Fitz Park. Among the town's annual events is the Keswick Convention, an Evangelical gathering attracting visitors from many countries.

Keswick became widely known for its association with the poets Samuel Taylor Coleridge and Robert Southey. Together with their fellow Lake Poet William Wordsworth, based at Grasmere, 12 mi (19 km) away, they made the scenic beauty of the area widely known to readers in Britain and beyond. In the late 19th century and into the 20th, Keswick was the focus of several important initiatives by the growing conservation movement, often led by Hardwicke Rawnsley, vicar of the nearby Crosthwaite parish and co-founder of the National Trust, which has built up extensive holdings in the area.

== Toponymy ==
The town is first recorded in Edward I's charter of the 13th century, as "Kesewik". Scholars have generally considered the name to be from the Old English, meaning "farm where cheese is made", the word deriving from "cēse" (cheese) with a Scandinavian initial "k" and "wīc" (special place or dwelling), although not all academics agree. George T. Flom of the University of Illinois Urbana-Champaign (1919) rejected that derivation on the grounds that a town in the heart of Viking-settled areas, as Keswick was, would not have been given a Saxon name; he proposed instead that the word is of Danish or Norse origin and means "Kell's place at the bend of the river". Among the later scholars supporting the "cheese farm" toponymy are Eilert Ekwall (1960) and A.D. Mills (2011) (both Oxford University Press), and Diana Whaley (2006), for the English Place-Name Society. (Note: Other suggested derivations include "kesh" (water hemlock), "Ketelswick" (after a supposed Viking settler) and "kis" (a Norwegian term for iron pyrites). Among those espousing the "cheese-farm" origin, Ekwall and Whaley equate the name of Keswick with that of the London area Chiswick; Whaley writes that the former's "K" is due to Scandinavian influence.)

== History ==
=== Pre-history ===
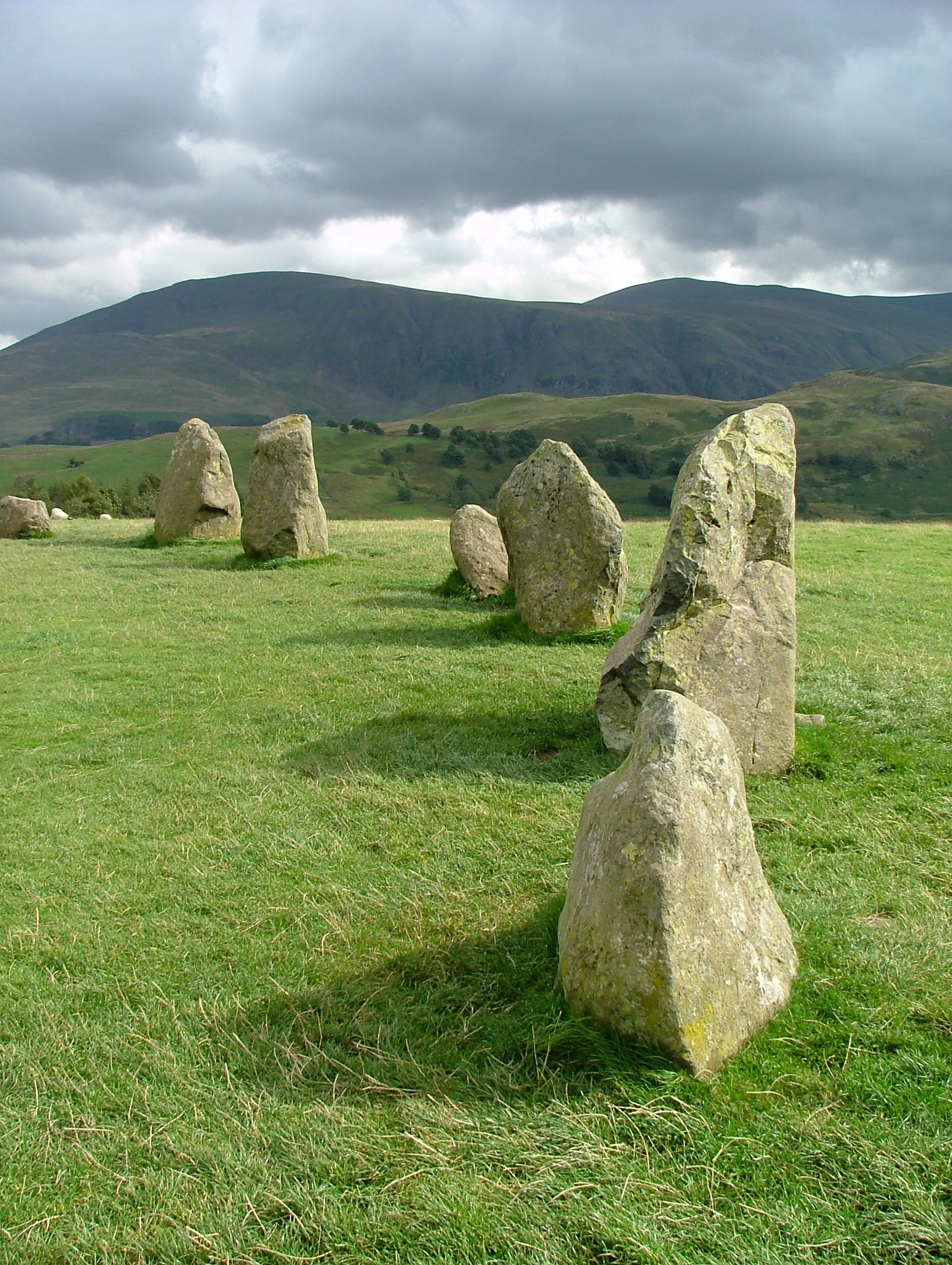
Castlerigg stone circle

Evidence of prehistoric occupation in the area includes the Castlerigg stone circle on the eastern fringe of the town, which has been dated to c. 3200 BC. Neolithic-era stone tools were unearthed inside the circle and in the centre of Keswick during the 19th century. The antiquary W. G. Collingwood, commenting in 1925 about finds in the area, wrote that they showed "Stone Age man was fairly at home in the Lake District". There is little evidence of sustained settlement in the area during the Bronze Age, but from excavations of hill forts it is clear that there was some Iron Age occupation, circa 500 BC, although scholars are not agreed about how permanent it was.

In Roman Britain Cumbria was the territory of the Carvetii. As the site of the western part of Hadrian's Wall, it was of strategic importance. The north of the county is rich in archaeological evidence from the period, but nothing is known that suggests any Roman habitation in the Keswick area, other than finds that point to the existence of one or more Roman highways passing the vicinity of the present-day town. Such nearby settlements as can be traced from the era of the Romans and the years after their departure seem to have been predominantly Celtic. Many local place names from the period, including that of the river Derwent, are Celtic, some closely related to Welsh equivalents. (Note: "Derwent" derives from "dervā", meaning "river where oaks are common", which Ekwall compares with the Welsh "derw".)

Several Christian saints preached the Gospel in the north of England in the late 6th and early 7th centuries AD; in Keswick and the surrounding area the most important figures were St Herbert of Derwentwater and his contemporary St Kentigern. The former, the pupil and friend of St Cuthbert of Lindisfarne, lived as a hermit on an island in Derwentwater, now named after him. Kentigern, who lived and preached in the area before moving to Wales, is traditionally held to have founded Crosthwaite Church, which was the parish church of Keswick until the 19th century.

=== Middle Ages ===
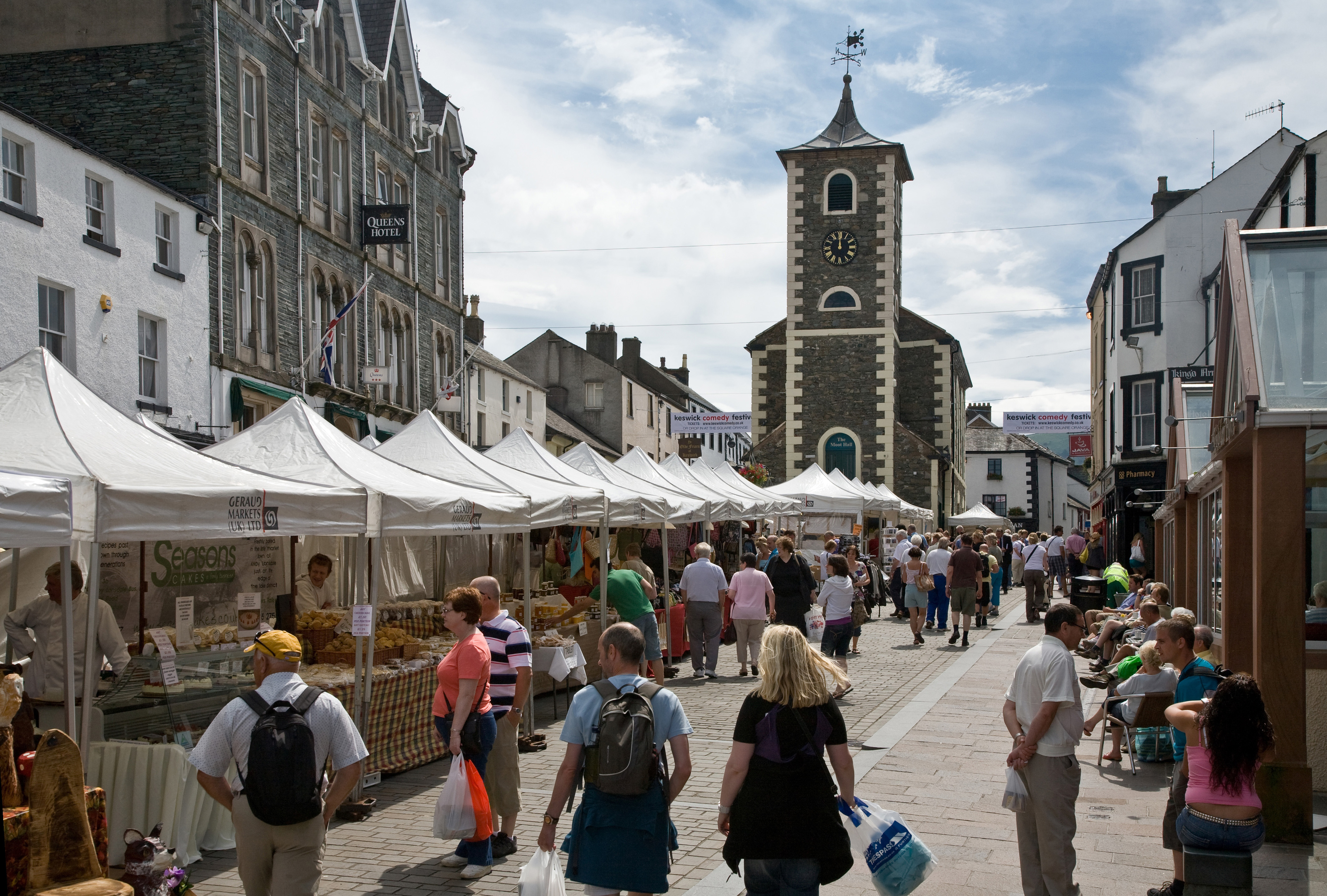
Keswick's market has existed for more than 700 years

Keswick's recorded history starts in the Middle Ages. The area was conquered by the Anglo-Saxon Kingdom of Northumbria in the 7th century, but Northumbria was destroyed by the Vikings in the late 9th century. In the early 10th century, the British Kingdom of Strathclyde seized the area and it remained part of Strathclyde until about 1050, when Siward, Earl of Northumbria, conquered Cumbria. In 1092, William II of England, son of William the Conqueror, marched north and established the great baronies of Allerdale-below-Derwent, Allerdale-above-Derwent and Greystoke, the borders of which met at Keswick. In 1181, Jocelyn of Furness wrote of a new church at Crosthwaite, Keswick, founded by Alice de Romilly, the Lady of Allerdale, a direct descendant of William II's original barons. In 1189, Richard I granted the rectory of Crosthwaite to the Cistercian order of Fountains Abbey.

During the 13th century, agricultural land around the town was acquired by Fountains and Furness Abbeys. The latter, already prosperous from the wool trade, wished to expand its sheep farming and bought large tracts of land from Alice de Romilly in 1208. She also negotiated with Fountains Abbey, to which she sold Derwent Island in Derwentwater, land at Watendlath, the mill at Crosthwaite and other land in Borrowdale. Keswick was at the hub of the monastic farms in the area and Fountains based a steward in the town, where tenants paid their rents. Furness also enjoyed profitable rights to the extraction of iron ore.

"Grant to Thomas de Derwentewatere, and his heirs, of a weekly market on Saturday at Kesewik in Derewentfelles, co. Cumberland, and of a yearly fair there on the vigil, the feast and the morrow of St. Mary Magdalene, and the two days following."

— Grant by Edward I, 18 July 1276

Keswick was granted a charter for a market in 1276 by Edward I. This market has an uninterrupted history lasting for more than 700 years. The pattern of buildings around the market square remained broadly the same from this period until at least the late 18th century, with houses – originally timber-framed – fronting the square and sturdily enclosed gardens or yards at the back. According to local tradition these stout walls and the narrow entrances to the yards were for defence against marauding Scots. In the event it appears that the town escaped such attacks, Scottish raiders finding richer and more accessible targets at Carlisle and the fertile Eden Valley, well to the north of Keswick.

=== 16th and 17th centuries: agriculture and industry ===
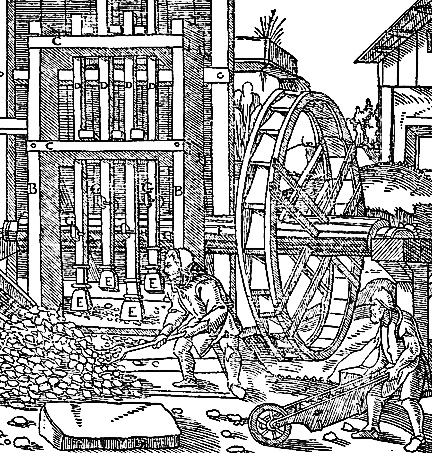
German miners sorting copper ore, 16th century

With the Dissolution of the Monasteries, between 1536 and 1541, Furness and Fountains Abbeys were supplanted by new secular landlords for the farmers of Keswick and its neighbourhood. The buying and selling of sheep and wool were no longer centred on the great Abbeys, being handled locally by the new landowners and tenants. This enhanced Keswick's importance as a market centre, though at first the town remained only modestly prosperous: in the 1530s John Leland wrote of it as "a lytle poore market town". By the second half of the century, copper mining had made Keswick richer: in 1586 William Camden wrote of "these copper works not only being sufficient for all England, but great quantities of the copper exported every year" with, at the centre, "Keswicke, a small market town, many years famous for the copper works as appears from a charter of king Edward IV, and at present inhabited by miners".

Earlier copper mining had been small in scale, but Elizabeth I, concerned for the defence of her kingdom, required large quantities of copper for the manufacture of weapons and the strengthening of warships. There was the additional advantage for her that the Crown was entitled to royalties on metals extracted from English land. The experts in copper mining were German and Elizabeth secured the services of Daniel Hechstetter of Augsburg, to whom she granted a licence to "search, dig, try, roast and melt all manner of mines and ores of gold, silver, copper and quicksilver" in the Keswick area and elsewhere.

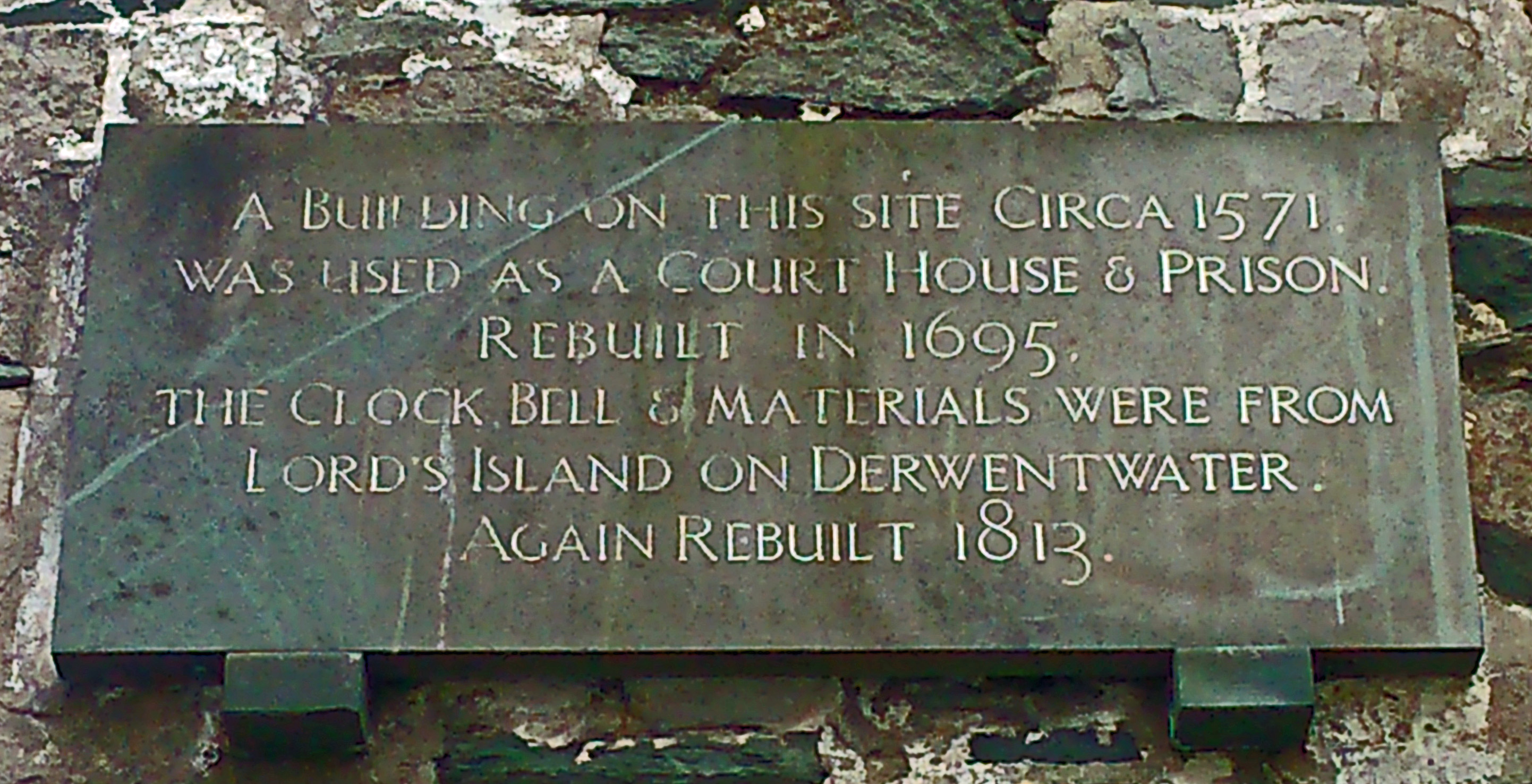
Plaque on Keswick's Moot Hall detailing its history from the 16th century

As well as copper, a new substance was found, extracted and exploited: this was variously called wad, black lead, plumbago or black cauke, and is now known as graphite. Many uses were quickly discovered for the mineral: it reduced friction in machinery, made a heat-resistant glaze for crucibles and when used to line moulds for cannonballs, resulted in rounder, smoother balls that could be fired further by English naval cannon. Later, from the second half of the 18th century, it was used to make pencils, for which Keswick became famous.

The copper mines prospered for about seventy years, but by the early 17th century the industry was in decline. Demand for copper fell and the cost of extracting it was high. Graphite mining continued and quarrying for slate began to grow in importance. Other small-scale industries grew up, such as tannery and weaving. Although the boom of the mid-16th century had finished, the town's economy did not slide into ruin and the population remained generally constant at a little under 1,000.

=== 18th and 19th centuries: beginnings of tourism ===
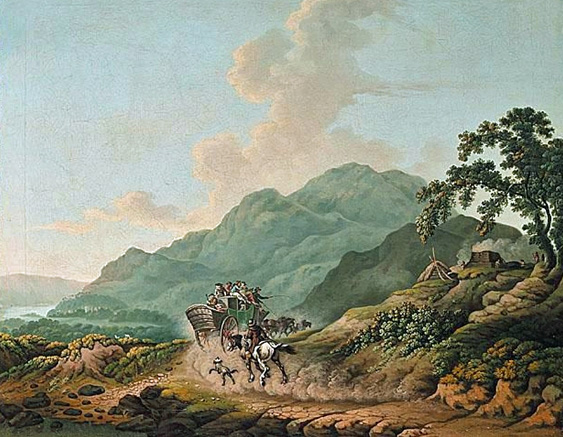
Skiddaw in Cumberland, a Summer Evening with a Coach and Horseman, by Philip James de Loutherbourg, 1787

The historian George Bott regards John Dalton (1709–63) and John Brown (1715–66) as the pioneers of tourism in the Lake District. Both wrote works praising the majesty of the scenery and their enthusiasm prompted others to visit the area. The poet Thomas Gray published an account of a five-day stay in Keswick in 1769, in which he described the view of the town as "the vale of Elysium in all its verdure" and was lyrical about the beauties of the fells and the lake. His journal was widely read, and was, in Bott's phrase, "an effective public relations job for Keswick". Painters such as Thomas Smith of Derby and William Bellers also contributed to the influx of visitors; engravings of their paintings of Cumberland scenery sold in large numbers, further enhancing the fame of the area. In 1800, the Romantic poet Samuel Taylor Coleridge wrote, "It is no small advantage that for two-thirds of the year we are in complete retirement – the other third is alive & swarms with Tourists of all shapes & sizes." Coleridge had moved to Keswick in that year and together with his fellow Lake Poets (see below) was possibly the strongest influence on the public esteem of Keswick and the Lake District.

During the 18th century and into the 19th, turnpike trusts were established and major roads in Cumberland were greatly improved. With the Lake District now accessible by coach the area attracted well-off visitors, particularly at times of war in mainland Europe, which made the aristocratic Grand Tour impossible there. Regular public coach services were established in the 1760s, but they were expensive. The ten-hour journey from Whitehaven to Penrith via Keswick cost 12 shillings (numerically equivalent to 60p), at a time when country labourers typically earned 10 shillings a week or less, and the annual income of even the most prosperous tenant farmers was rarely more than £200. Nonetheless, by the 19th century the number of tourists visiting Keswick during each season was estimated at between 12,000 and 15,000. Some of the Keswick inns that catered for affluent visitors remain as hotels, including the Queen's, where Gray stayed.

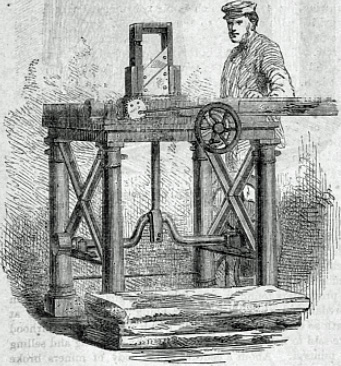
Pencil-making at Keswick in the 1850s

The construction of the railways in the mid-19th century made the Lake District, and Keswick in particular, more accessible to visitors of modest means. The original impetus for building the Cockermouth, Keswick and Penrith Railway (CKP) line came from heavy industry: the new Bessemer process of steelmaking brought a great demand for the rich iron ore from west Cumberland and the coking coal from Durham on the east side of the country. The CKP was built to enable ore and coal to be brought together at steel foundries in both counties. The line opened for goods traffic in 1864 and it began to carry passengers in the following year. Fares varied, but holidaymakers could buy excursion tickets at discounted prices, such as six shillings for the 170 mi (270 km) return journey from Preston to Keswick.

In addition to its growing importance as a tourist centre, Keswick developed a reputation for its manufacture of pencils during the 19th century. It had begun on a modest scale in about 1792, as a cottage industry, using graphite mined locally. This developed on more industrial lines in factories purpose-built by several companies. Pencil making was the town's most important manufacturing industry by the mid-19th century, textiles and leather goods having declined.

The Moot Hall was rebuilt in 1813 and the lower floor was used as a market house on Saturdays. Coal gas was supplied by a gas works from 1846; the Keswick library opened in 1849; a water works began operation in 1856; and Keswick police station opened in 1857. The local weekly newspaper, The Keswick Reminder was founded in 1896 and continues to be published every Friday. In an article in The Observer in 1978, Christopher Brasher wrote that as long as the Reminder flourishes, "there will be one corner of these islands that is forever England."

Canon Hardwicke Rawnsley, cleric and conservationist

In 1883, Hardwicke Rawnsley was appointed vicar of Crosthwaite. In a study of Lake District towns in 1974, H. A. L. Rice commented that to write about Keswick without mentioning Rawnsley would be the equivalent of writing about Stratford-upon-Avon without mentioning Shakespeare, so great was Rawnsley's impact on the town. He and his wife set up classes to teach metalwork and wood carving; these grew into the Keswick School of Industrial Art, which trained local craftsmen and women from 1894 until it closed in 1986. He revived the ancient May Day festival in the town and was a leading figure in the establishment of Keswick School, Blencathra Sanatorium and the County Farm School. As co-founder of the National Trust, Rawnsley contributed to Keswick's continued growth as a tourist centre, with the acquisition by the Trust of many acres of popular scenic land around Derwentwater, beginning with Brandelhow Wood in 1902.

=== 20th and 21st century ===
Keswick's history throughout the 20th century was one of increasing reliance on tourism, the pencil industry being the second largest source of employment. The Cumberland Pencil Company, formed at the turn of the century, occupied a large factory near the river Greta on the road leading out of Keswick towards Cockermouth. The conservation movement continued to develop; Rawnsley led successful campaigns to save the medieval Greta and Portinscale bridges from replacement with ferro-concrete structures; and the National Trust continued to acquire land locally. In the First World War, Keswick lost many of its young men: the war memorial near Fitz Park commemorates 117 names, from a population at the time of less than 4,500.

By the 1930s, Keswick was firmly established as the main centre of tourism in Cumberland and Westmorland. An article in The Manchester Guardian in 1934 called it "the capital of the Lake District" and continued:

"Keswick's chief industry is to promote the contentment and happiness of its visitors. Its pleasant position provides at the outset a tonic atmosphere... it is set in the most delightful part of a delightful district, described by Wordsworth as "the loveliest spot that ever man has found". There are numerous places of interest and fine shops, and good accommodation is offered to visitors at reasonable prices. Keswick is the best centre from which to visit Lakeland."

During the Second World War, students from St Katharine's College, Liverpool and Roedean School, Sussex, were evacuated to Keswick when their own buildings were requisitioned for use as a hospital and a navy base respectively. Students were also brought to the safety of Keswick from Central Newcastle High School, Hunmanby Hall School, Yorkshire, and the Liverpool Orphanage.

The creation of the Lake District National Park in 1951, with strict control over new development, prevented any expansion of the town beyond its pre-war borders. Keswick's population has remained stable at a little below 5,000 residents. (Note: The figures for the 1991, 2001 and 2011 censuses were respectively 4,836, 4,984 and 4,821.) The town's reliance on tourism increased in 2006 when Cumberland Pencils moved production from Keswick to Lillyhall, Workington, only the Derwent Pencil Museum remaining at the old site. At the beginning of the 21st century, more than 60% of the population were employed in hotels, restaurants and distribution. A survey of retail premises in 2000 found that more than 10% were outdoor clothes shops, a similar proportion were cafés or restaurants, and more than 8% were gift shops. The age profile of the Keswick population is significantly higher than the English average. In 2011 children under 10 made up 7.6% of the town's population, compared with 11.9% for England as a whole. Between ages 10 and 20 the comparable figures are 10.2 and 12.1; and from ages 20 to 44, 25.9 as against 34.3. The percentage of Keswick's population aged 45 and upwards is above the national average, the largest difference being within the 75- to 84-year-old bracket, which contains 9.6% of Keswick's population compared with a national average of 5.5. Figures from the same census show that Keswick has fewer than average "large employers and higher managerial occupations" and more small employers and self-employed people. Long-term unemployment is considerably below the average for England. (Note: The respective figures are 1.9 compared to 3.5%; 15.5 to 7%; and 0.3 to 1%.)

=== Ownership ===
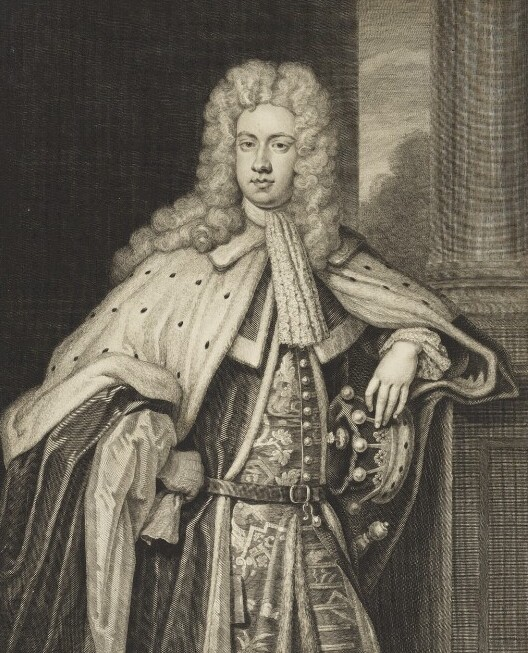
James Radclyffe, 3rd Earl of Derwentwater, who was executed for treason in 1716

In medieval times, the township was within the manor of Castlerigg and Derwentwater. The earliest surviving official record of the town is the market charter of 1276 granted to the lord of the manor, Thomas de Derwentwater. The manor was granted by Alice de Romilly to Adam de Derwentwater before 1216 and subsequently passed to the Radclyffe family through marriage. The Derwentwater estate was forfeit to the Crown after the execution of James Radclyffe, 3rd Earl of Derwentwater in 1716 for his involvement in the Jacobite rising of 1715. In 1735 the Crown granted the income from the estates to support the Greenwich Hospital, London. Land to the south and west were part of Greenwich Hospital's forestry and farming estates until the 19th century. In 1925 the then owner, Sir John Randles, gave the National Trust 90 acres (36 ha) of land in this estate, including the foreshore woodland.

== Governance ==
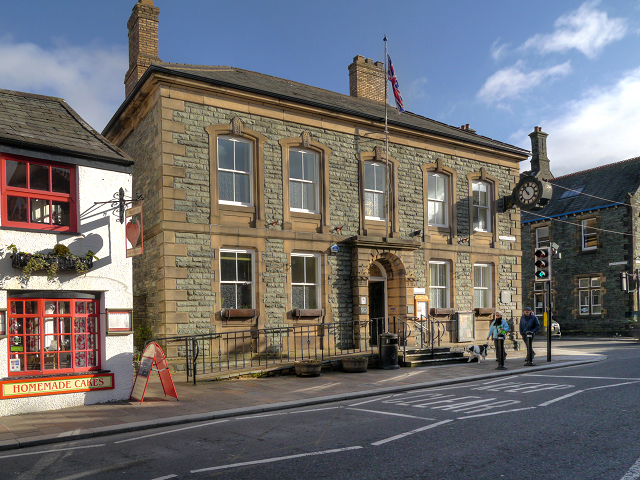
Council Offices, 50 Main Street

=== Local ===
There are two tiers of local government covering Keswick, at parish (town) and unitary authority level: Keswick Town Council and Cumberland Council. The town council is based at 50 Main Street. The parish is wholly within the Lake District National Park and so some functions are administered by the Lake District National Park Authority, notably planning.

=== National ===
For national elections, Keswick lies within the Penrith and Solway constituency.

=== Administrative history ===
Keswick was historically a township of the extensive parish of Crosthwaite, in the historic county of Cumberland. Crosthwaite's parish church of St Kentigern's is 0.5 miles (0.8 km) north of the centre of Keswick at Great Crosthwaite on the north side of the River Greta; it was historically in the township of Underskiddaw. The township of Keswick took on civil functions under the poor laws from the 17th century onwards and therefore also became a civil parish in 1866, when the legal definition of 'parish' was changed to be the areas used for administering the poor laws. In ecclesiastical terms, Keswick became a separate ecclesiastical parish from Crosthwaite in 1839, following the completion of St John's Church in the town.

The township of Keswick was also made a local board district in 1853. The district's boundaries were enlarged in 1876 to take in part of the neighbouring township of St John's Castlerigg and Wythburn. The boundaries were enlarged again in 1894, to take in Great Crosthwaite village from the civil parish of Underskiddaw, further territory from St John's Castlerigg and Wythburn, and a former extra-parochial area east of the town known as Briery. Local board districts were reconstituted as urban districts under the Local Government Act 1894.

In its early days, the urban district council met at the town's Moot Hall and bought the building from the lord of the manor in 1896. The urban district council moved its meetings and offices to a converted former bank at 50 Main Street in 1926.

Keswick Urban District was abolished in 1974. The area became part of the borough of Allerdale in the new county of Cumbria. A successor parish of Keswick was created covering the former urban district, with its parish council taking the name Keswick Town Council. Allerdale was abolished in 2023 when the new Cumberland Council was created, also taking over the functions of the abolished Cumbria County Council in the area.

== Geography ==
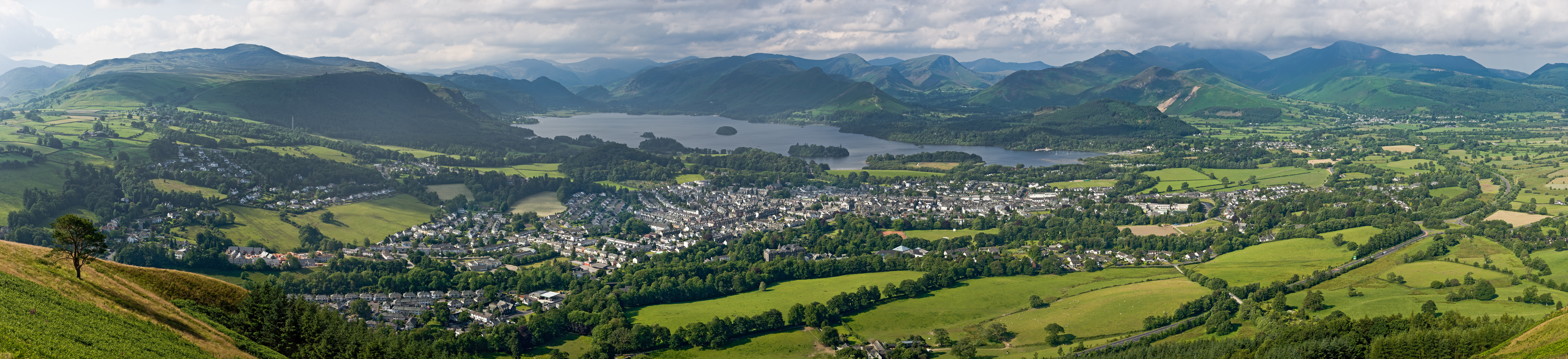
A panoramic view of Keswick, Derwentwater and the surrounding fells, as viewed from Latrigg to the north

Keswick lies in North West England, in the heart of the northern Lake District. The town is 31 1/2 mi (50.7 km) south-west of Carlisle, 22 mi (35 km) north-west of Windermere and 14 1/4 mi (23 km) south-east of Cockermouth. Derwentwater, the lake south-west of the town, measures approximately 3 mi × 1 mi (5 km × 1.5 km) and is some 72 ft (22 m) deep. It contains several islands, including Derwent Isle, Lord's Island, Rampsholme Island and St Herbert's Island, the largest. Derwent Isle is the only island on the lake that is inhabited; it is run by the National Trust and open to visitors five days a year. The land between Keswick and the lake consists mainly of fields and areas of woodland, including Isthmus Wood, Cockshot Wood, Castlehead Wood and Horseclose and Great Wood, further to the south. The river Derwent flows from Derwentwater to Bassenthwaite, the most northerly of the major Cumbrian lakes. The Derwent and its tributary the Greta, which flows through Keswick, meet to the east of Portinscale. The source of the Greta is near Threlkeld, at the confluence of the river Glenderamackin and St John's Beck.

Keswick is in the lee of the Skiddaw group, the oldest group of rocks in the Lake District. These fells were formed during the Ordovician period, 488 to 443 million years ago; they form a triangle sheltering the town, reaching a maximum height of 931 m (3,054 ft) on Skiddaw itself. To the west of Portinscale, to the south-west of the village of Thornthwaite, is Whinlatter Forest Park and Grisedale Pike. To the east, beyond Castlerigg stone circle, is St John's in the Vale, at the foot of the Helvellyn range, which is popular with ramblers starting from Keswick. In 2010, Electricity North West, United Utilities, the Lake District National Park Authority and the conservation charity Friends of the Lake District invested £100,000 to remove power lines and replace them with underground cables, to improve the quality of scenery in the vicinity.

Climatically, Keswick is in the north-west sector of the UK, which is characterised by cool summers, mild winters and high monthly rainfalls throughout the year. Keswick's wettest months fall at the end of the year, the peak average of 195.2 mm (7.69 in) falling in December. Rain and temperature figures are shown below.

Climate data for Keswick (1991–2020 normals)
Month	Jan	Feb	Mar	Apr	May	Jun	Jul	Aug	Sep	Oct	Nov	Dec	Year
Record high °C (°F)	15.9 (60.6)	19.4 (66.9)	21.0 (69.8)	24.5 (76.1)	27.7 (81.9)	31.2 (88.2)	34.3 (93.7)	29.9 (85.8)	27.9 (82.2)	22.7 (72.9)	17.9 (64.2)	16.2 (61.2)	34.3 (93.7)
Mean daily maximum °C (°F)	7.4 (45.3)	7.8 (46.0)	9.7 (49.5)	12.4 (54.3)	15.8 (60.4)	18.2 (64.8)	19.8 (67.6)	19.2 (66.6)	17.0 (62.6)	13.5 (56.3)	10.0 (50.0)	7.8 (46.0)	13.2 (55.8)
Daily mean °C (°F)	4.7 (40.5)	4.8 (40.6)	6.3 (43.3)	8.4 (47.1)	11.3 (52.3)	14.0 (57.2)	15.7 (60.3)	15.3 (59.5)	13.2 (55.8)	10.2 (50.4)	7.1 (44.8)	4.9 (40.8)	9.7 (49.5)
Mean daily minimum °C (°F)	2.0 (35.6)	1.8 (35.2)	2.8 (37.0)	4.4 (39.9)	6.8 (44.2)	9.7 (49.5)	11.6 (52.9)	11.4 (52.5)	9.4 (48.9)	6.8 (44.2)	4.2 (39.6)	1.9 (35.4)	6.1 (43.0)
Record low °C (°F)	−9.6 (14.7)	−8.2 (17.2)	−8.2 (17.2)	−5.1 (22.8)	−3.1 (26.4)	0.2 (32.4)	3.6 (38.5)	1.7 (35.1)	−0.8 (30.6)	−6.4 (20.5)	−7.7 (18.1)	−14.5 (5.9)	−14.5 (5.9)
Average precipitation mm (inches)	172.5 (6.79)	135.4 (5.33)	114.9 (4.52)	82.8 (3.26)	81.6 (3.21)	89.9 (3.54)	94.9 (3.74)	120.2 (4.73)	124.4 (4.90)	175.0 (6.89)	188.6 (7.43)	195.2 (7.69)	1,575.2 (62.02)
Average precipitation days (≥ 1.0 mm)	16.8	14.3	14.1	12.5	12.4	12.7	13.5	15.2	13.5	17.0	18.2	17.8	177.9
Source 1: Met Office
Source 2: Starlings Roost Weather

== Demography ==
At the 2021 census, the parish had a population of 4,658 and the built up area had a population of 4,344. (Note: To get data for individual built-up areas, query the 'Population Estimates / Projections' dataset, then the 'Small area (2021 based) by single year of age - England and Wales' and then choose '2022 built-up areas' for the geography.) The population of the parish had been 5,243 at the 2011 census.

The registers of Crosthwaite Church stated that there were 238 interments in 1623, believed to have been something between a twelfth and a tenth of the whole population of the parish at that time. In the 1640s, there was a sharp fall in population, brought on by the plague epidemic which affected Keswick, Carlisle, Cockermouth, Crosthwaite and other areas in 1645–47.

In the 1801 census, the township of Keswick, including the town and surrounding hamlets, had a reported population of 1,350 people. The population grew at a steady rate, increasing to 1,683 in 1811, 1,901 in 1821, 2,159 in 1831, 2,442 in 1841 and 2,618 in 1851. In 1871, the township had a population of 2,777 people. The population grew at a faster rate towards the late 19th century and, by 1901, it stood at 4,451 people. There has been little fluctuation in population since and the town had a population of 4,836 in the 1991 census . In the 2001 census, 4,984 people were recorded and 4,821 in 2011. At the 2021 census, 54.3% of the population identified as Christian, 37.8% as non-religious, 0.4% as Buddhist, 0.3% as Muslim, 0.2% as Hindu and 0.3% as some other faith. The remaining 6.7% did not specify their religion.

== Landmarks ==
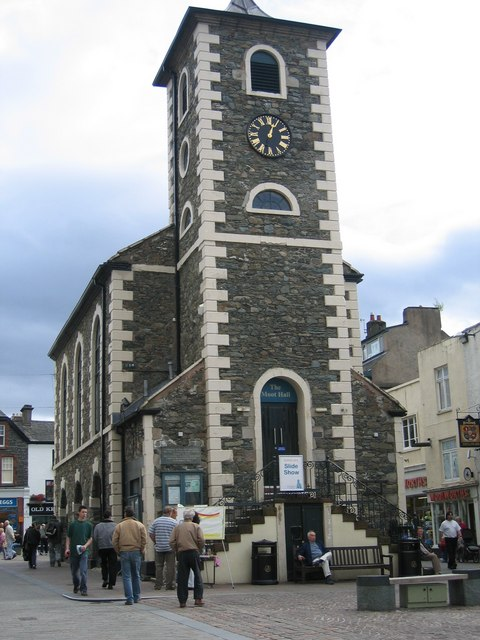
Moot Hall in Keswick

Keswick is the home of the Theatre by the Lake, opened in 1999. The theatre serves a dual purpose as the permanent home of a professional repertory company and a venue for visiting performers and festivals. It replaced the Century Theatre or "Blue Box", which had spent 25 years in semi-retirement on a permanent lakeside site in Keswick, after a career of similar length as a mobile theatre.

The Alhambra cinema in St John Street, opened in 1913, is one of the oldest continuously functioning cinemas in the country; it is equipped with digital technology and satellite receiving equipment to allow the live screening of plays, operas and ballet from the National Theatre, Royal Opera House and other venues.

The town is the site of the Derwent Pencil Museum. One of the exhibits is what is claimed to be the world's largest coloured pencil. Fitz Park, on the bank of the River Greta, is home to the Keswick Museum and Art Gallery, a Victorian museum which features the Musical Stones of Skiddaw, Southey manuscripts and a collection of sculptures and paintings of regional and wider importance, including works by Epstein, John Opie, Richard Westall and others. After extensive restoration and enlargement the museum reopened in 2014. In 2001 the cricket ground in Fitz Park was named the most beautiful in England by Wisden Cricket Monthly.

Greta Hall (see Lake Poets, below), is a Grade I listed building. The home of Coleridge in 1800–04 and Southey from 1803 until 1843, it later became part of Keswick School and is now in private ownership, partly divided into holiday flats. The three-storey house dates to the late 18th century and features a flush-panelled central double door with Gothic top panels and Venetian windows. A carved oak fireplace inside is dated to 1684. The Moot Hall is a prominent Grade II* listed building situated at the southern end of Main Street. It was built in 1571 and rebuilt in 1695, and the current building dates to 1813. It is built of lime-washed stone and slate walling, and has a square tower on the north end with a round-arched doorway and a double flight of exterior steps. At the top of the tower is what the Keswick Tourist Information Board describes as an "unusual one-handed clock". Formerly an assembly building, The Moot Hall contains a tourist information centre on the ground floor, with an art gallery on the floor above.

The prominent social thinker and art critic John Ruskin, who had links to Keswick, is commemorated by a memorial at Friars' Crag. Erected in 1900 on Rawnsley's initiative, it is a Grade II listed structure.

=== Churches ===
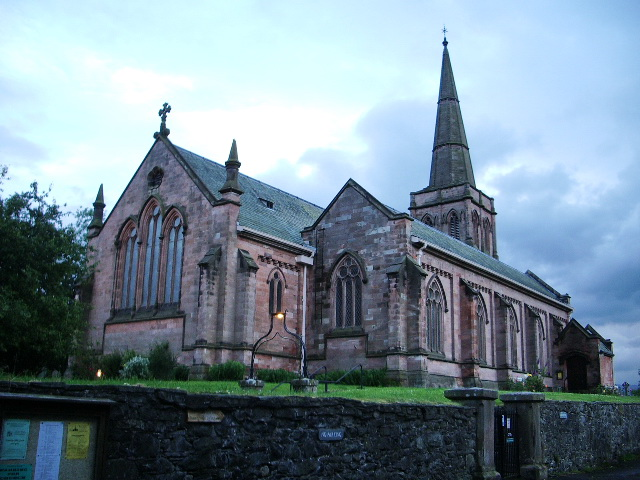
St John's Church, dating from 1838, is the parish church of Keswick

Until 1838, Keswick had no Anglican church within the town boundaries and was part of the widespread parish of Crosthwaite. The present parish church, St John's, was designed by Anthony Salvin and consecrated in 1838. It is geometrical in style, with pink castle-head ashlar sandstone and a slate roof. The church was extended in 1862, 1882 and 1889 by the parish's benefactors the Marshall family; the chancel windows, designed by Henry Holiday, installed in 1879, were taken down and reinstalled when the chancel was extended in 1889. St John's became a Grade II* listed building in 1951. Keswick's former parish church, St Kentigern's, at Crosthwaite, just outside the town, is also Grade II* listed. Dated to at least the 14th century, it is built mainly in the Tudor-Gothic style and was expanded in 1523 and later restored in 1844 by George Gilbert Scott.

The Quakers had an early meeting house in the town, replaced in 1715 by one at Underskiddaw. Protestant dissenters met at a private house from 1705 or before, moving to a chapel in Lake Road in the latter part of the 18th century. A Congregational chapel was built in 1858–59. The first Wesleyan chapel was built in 1814 in a small yard off Main Street at a cost of £331 10s; the present Methodist church is in Southey Street. Since 1928 Roman Catholics in Keswick have been served by Our Lady of the Lakes and St Charles in High Hill. A new Quaker meeting house opened in the town in 1994. An Eastern Orthodox church was inaugurated in 2007, holding services in Keswick and the nearby village of Braithwaite.

There are no other religious buildings in Keswick.

=== Public houses and hotels ===
Keswick's old inns and their successors include many listed buildings, mainly Grade II in designation. The George Hotel, stated to be the oldest inn in the town, dates to the 16th century, with the alterations made during the Georgian period still evident. The King's Arms Hotel, in the main market square, dates from the early 19th century; it is built from stuccoed stone, with Victorian shop windows on the ground floor. The Queen's Hotel in Main Street, a pebbledashed stone building dating from the late 18th century, was renamed "The Inn on the Square" in 2015. The Bank Tavern in Main Street and the Dog and Gun public house in Lake Road are both Grade II listed 18th-century buildings.

Listed buildings in Keswick

The following are the listed buildings in Keswick, which are graded:

- 10–15 Borrowdale Road (Grade II)
- 123 and 125 Main Street (Grade II)
- 17–23 St John's Street (Grade II)
- 18 High Hill (Grade II)
- 2 Eskin Street (Grade II)
- 25 St John's Street (Grade II)
- 3 Penrith Road (Grade II)
- 3–6 High Hill (Grade II)
- 36–50 St John's Street (Grade II)
- 4 and 6 Derwent Street (Grade II)
- 4 and 6 Eskin Street (Grade II)
- 6–12 Police station court (Grade II)
- 8 and 10 Eskin Street (Grade II)
- 85–91 Main Street (Grade II)
- Balustrading, urns and terrace wall to the garden on the north side of Castlerigg Manor (Grade II)
- Brigham Forge Cottages (Grade II)
- Calvert's Bridge (Grade II)
- Castlerigg Manor (Catholic Youth Centre) (Grade II)
- Castlerigg Manor Lodge (Grade II)
- Central Hotel (Grade II)
- Chestnut Hill House Shelley Cottage with adjoining stables and coach house to the north (Grade II)
- Church of St John (Grade II*)
- Church of St Kentigern (Grade II*)
- County Hotel (Grade II)
- Crosthwaite Sunday School (Grade II)
- Crosthwaite Vicarage (Grade II)
- Derwent Isle House (Grade II)
- Forge Bridge (Grade II)
- Formerly Mayson's Shop (Grade II)
- George Hotel (Grade II)
- Greta House (Grade I)
- Heads House (Grade II)
- Ivy Cottage (Grade II)
- Keswick Industrial Arts (Grade II)
- Keswick railway station building and platform (Grade II)
- King's Arms Hotel (Grade II)
- Oak Cottage Oak Lodge (Grade II)
- Oddfellows Arms Public House (Grade II)
- Packhorse Inn Including Attached Former Stables (Grade II)
- Police Station and Magistrates Court (Grade II)
- Priorholm Hotel (Grade II)
- Royal Oak Hotel (Grade II)
- Ruskin Monument (Grade II)
- Skiddaw Cottage (Grade II)
- Small outbuilding opposite the Packhorse Inn and behind Ye Olde Friars (Grade II)
- The Bank Tavern (Grade II)
- The Dog and Gun public house (Grade II)
- The Moot Hall (Grade II*)
- The Old Chapel at Landing Stage (Grade II)
- Toll Bar Cottage (Grade II).

== Education ==
The Crosthwaite Free Grammar School, adjoining Crosthwaite churchyard, was an ancient institution, its date of foundation uncertain. In 1819, the parish of Crosthwaite had five or six schools in the town and the outlying areas, with a total of 332 children. By 1833, Keswick had twelve daily schools, including a new National School at High Hill. The new parish church of Keswick, St John's, started educational work in 1840 with a Sunday school which also educated infant boys, and later girls, on weekdays. A full-time boys' school opened in 1853.

For older pupils, Keswick School, the free co-educational grammar school, successor to the Crosthwaite Free Grammar School, opened at a site diagonally opposite Greta Bridge in 1898. In 1951 a new secondary modern school was built at Lairthwaite in Underskiddaw.

Junior education is provided by St Herbert's School, which had a roll of 263 in 2013. At senior level, Keswick and Lairthwaite schools merged in 1980 as a single comprehensive secondary school, with the name Keswick School. It was included in The Daily Telegraph's list of the top thirty comprehensives in England, Wales and Northern Ireland in 2014. The Local Education Authority for Keswick is Cumbria.

== Health ==
The Mary Hewetson Cottage Hospital, founded in 1892, has fifteen beds and a minor injuries unit. It underwent a major rebuilding and upgrade in 2013.

== Transport ==
=== Buses ===
From the town's bus station, Stagecoach Cumbria & North Lancashire operates routes to Workington, Cockermouth, Penrith, Grasmere, Ambleside, Windermere, Kendal, Lancaster, Seatoller, Buttermere and Whinlatter visitor centre. (Note: Service 77C also operates to Cockermouth, via Seatoller and Buttermere, once an evening.) Open top buses run to Seatoller.

=== Roads ===
Keswick is on the A66 road linking Workington and Penrith, as well as the A591, linking the town to Windermere, Kendal and Carlisle (via the A595).

The flow of traffic from Penrith to Cockermouth and beyond was eased after the A66 was diverted to a new bypass in 1974, a development that caused controversy because of a prominent new viaduct carrying the road across the Greta Gorge to the north of the town.

The majority of visitors arrive by car and are catered for by three town centre car parks, another large one next to the Theatre by the Lake and smaller ones elsewhere in the town.

=== Railway ===
Keswick was served by the Cockermouth, Keswick and Penrith Railway, which opened for passenger traffic in 1865. Passenger services between Keswick and Cockermouth were withdrawn in 1966, with the remainder of the line closing in 1972. (Note: From 1923 to 1948, the line was part of the London, Midland and Scottish Railway; from 1948 until its closure, it was part of British Railways.) Since the 1990s, a plan to reopen the line has been under discussion. Some 90% of the railway's earthworks still exists. According to 2000 estimates, a reopening would cost £25 million.

The nearest National Rail station is now at Penrith, served by Avanti West Coast services between London Euston and Glasgow Central or Edinburgh Waverley, and TransPennine Express services between Manchester Airport or Liverpool Lime Street and Glasgow Central or Edinburgh Waverley.

The former Keswick station building has been restored and now forms part of the adjacent hotel, with the hotel's glazed lounge occupying part of the platform. The section of line between Keswick and Threlkeld has been converted into a footpath and cycle path.

== Culture ==
=== Regular events ===
Annual events in the town's calendar include the Keswick Film Festival (February–March). It features screenings of old and new films, interviews with directors, and the festival's Osprey Awards for short films by local filmmakers. The ten-day Words by the Water literary festival is held in March every year, based at the Theatre by the Lake. The festival began in 1995 and events have been presented by Melvyn Bragg, Louis de Bernières, Germaine Greer, Steve Jones, Penelope Lively, Princess Michael of Kent, Michael Rosen and Joanna Trollope.

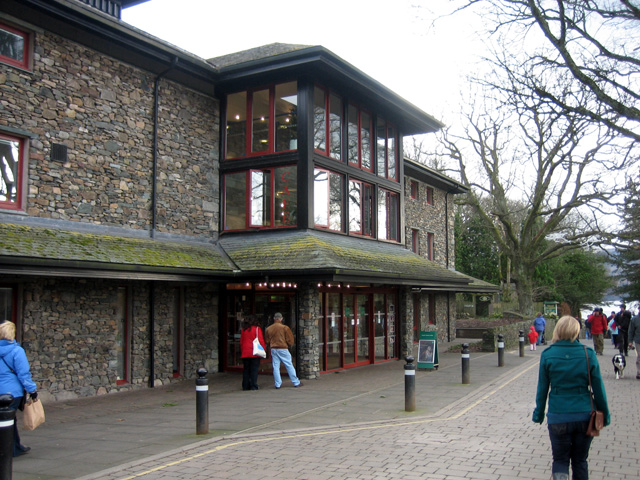
The Theatre by the Lake, venue for the Words by the Water festival

In May each year, Keswick is host to three contrasting events. The Keswick Half Marathon, in the early part of the month takes participants around Derwentwater with an additional loop into Newlands Valley. In the second week of May, there is the four-day Keswick Jazz Festival, with more than 100 jazz events at a dozen local venues. Participants include British and international exponents of mainstream and traditional jazz. After the Jazz Festival is the four-day Keswick Mountain Festival in mid-May. In the words of the organisers, the festival "celebrates everything we all love about the outdoors". It includes ghyll scrambling, mountain biking, guided walks, map reading, canoeing, climbing, a triathlon and other events.

The main event of the town's calendar in June is the Keswick Beer Festival, a two-day event that attracts more than 5,000 participants each year. July is marked by the opening of the annual Keswick Convention, an international gathering of Evangelical Christians, described in 1925 as "the last stronghold of British Puritanism", promoting biblical teaching and pious lifestyles. Among those associated with the Convention have been Frank Buchman and Billy Graham. The event has grown from a single week to three weeks, straddling the latter part of July and early August.

In August, Keswick features the Derwentwater Regatta; it was inaugurated by the eccentric local landowner Joseph Pocklington in 1792, and after a lapse of more than two centuries was revived in 2013. Its organisers describe it as "A weekend of mayhem and madness afloat, with the chance to climb aboard in a variety of races on Derwentwater". The Keswick Agricultural Show, founded in 1860, has traditionally been held on August Bank Holiday Monday at the western edge of the town on the Crossing Fields section of the open land known as the Howrahs. (Note: The name dates back to the 18th century; the historian J.W. Kaye links it to the landowner, Edward Stephenson, who retired to his native Keswick having been an important figure in the East India Company. Stephenson was based in Calcutta of which Howrah was a suburb.) The show features both commercial and charity stands, and attracts large numbers of competitors, exhibitors and spectators. From 2014 the venue has changed to Pump Field, a few hundred yards further from the town centre towards Braithwaite.

Classical music is presented throughout the year, both in conjunction with the Lake District Summer Music Festival and independently through the Keswick Choral Society and the Keswick Music Society, which was founded in 1947. Performers in Keswick have included the Chilingirian Quartet, the Royal Northern Sinfonia, Tasmin Little, the City of London Sinfonia, Red Priest and Nicolai Demidenko.

=== Lake Poets and other Keswick notables ===
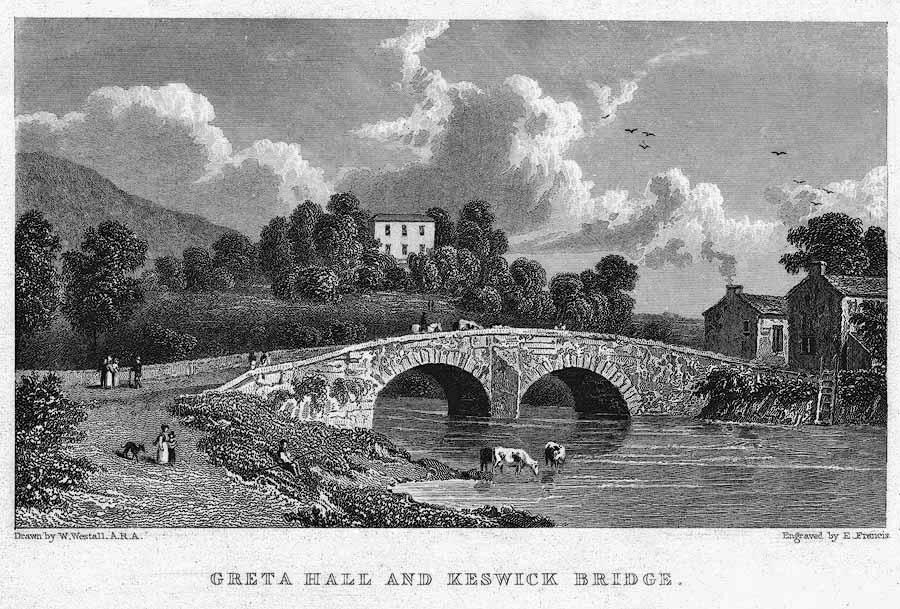
Greta Hall, behind Greta Bridge

Coleridge and William Wordsworth were close friends and collaborators; when Wordsworth and his sister Dorothy took up residence in the Lake District in late 1799 it was, in Bott's word, inevitable that Coleridge would follow suit. Six months after the Wordsworths moved into Dove Cottage at Grasmere, Coleridge leased Greta Hall in Keswick, 12 mi (19 km) away. In 1803 Robert Southey, Coleridge's brother-in-law, agreed to share the house with Coleridge and his family. Southey remained at Greta Hall after Coleridge left in 1804 and it remained Southey's family home until his death in 1843. Many famous literary figures stayed at Greta Hall in these years, including the Wordsworths, Charles and Mary Lamb, Thomas de Quincey, William Hazlitt, Percy Bysshe Shelley and Sir Walter Scott. Lamb, a Londoner devoted to his native city, remained doubtful of the attractions of the Lake District, but most of the visitors to Greta Hall wrote eloquently of the beauty of the scenery, and further enhanced the public regard for, and desire to visit, the area. Southey was well regarded locally, but played little part in the life of the town. He is buried in Crosthwaite churchyard and there is a memorial to him inside the church, with an inscription written by Wordsworth.

Prominent Keswickians: Bankes, Myers and Walpole

Among Keswick notables before the Lake Poets was Sir John Bankes, a leading Royalist during the English Civil War. He was Charles I's Attorney General and Chief Justice. Bankes was born at Castlerigg near Keswick in 1589. A bust in his memory is in upper Fitz Park close to the museum. In 2014 he was further commemorated by the conversion of the former Keswick courthouse into a bar named in his honour with his full title, "The Chief Justice of the Common Pleas".

Later residents of the area have included the classical scholar, essayist, poet and founder of the Society for Psychical Research, Frederic Myers, who was born in Keswick, and the campaigner for animal welfare Donald Watson, founder of the Vegan Society, who lived in Keswick after retiring from teaching. The pioneer mountaineers and photographers George and Ashley Abraham lived and worked in Keswick. Their photographic shop in Lake Road, built in 1887, was later taken over by the local mountaineer and outfitter George Fisher; the shop still contains memorabilia, including photographs, from the Abrahams' era.

Of literary figures after the Lake Poets, among those most closely associated with Keswick was the novelist Hugh Walpole; in 1924, he moved into Brackenburn, a house between Keswick and Grange at the opposite end of Derwentwater. Like the Lake Poets in the previous century, he wrote enthusiastically about the Lake District, and its scenery and atmosphere often found their way into his fiction. He wrote in 1939, "That I love Cumberland with all my heart and soul is another reason for my pleasure in writing these Herries books. That I wasn't born a Cumbrian isn't my fault: that Cumbrians, in spite of my 'foreignness', have been so kind to me, is my good fortune."

== Media ==
Local TV coverage is provided by BBC North East and Cumbria and ITV Border. Television signals are received from the Caldbeck and local relay transmitters.

Local radio stations are BBC Radio Cumbria, Smooth Lake District, Greatest Hits Radio Cumbria & South West Scotland, and Lake District Radio, a community radio station that broadcast on-line.

Local newspapers include The Keswick Reminder and The Westmorland Gazette.

== Sport ==
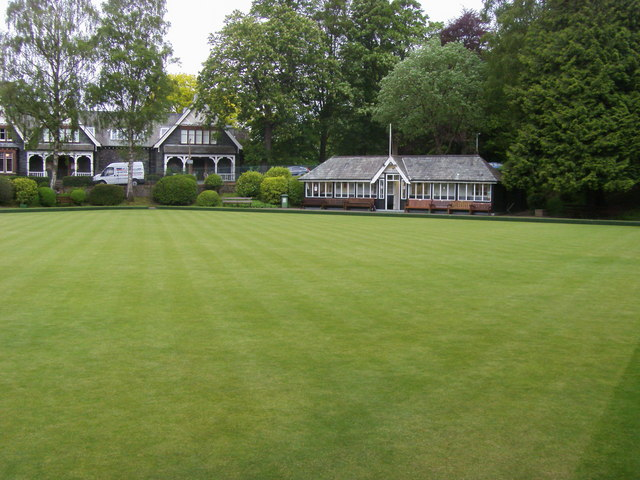
Keswick Bowls Club, with the town's Museum and Art Gallery in the background, top left

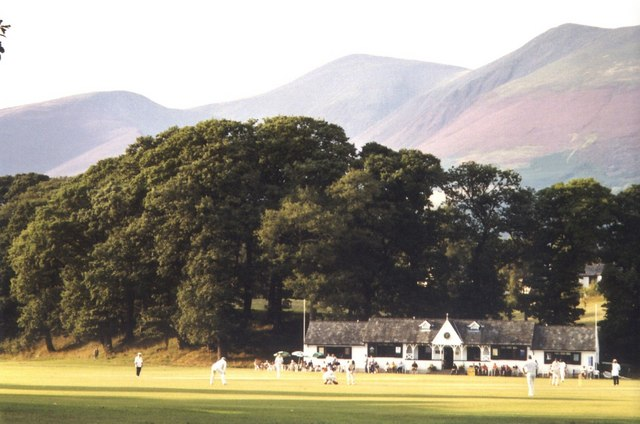
Cricket ground in Fitz Park

The town is home to Keswick Football Club. The principal team plays in the Westmorland League Division One and it also has a reserve team which plays in Westmorland League Division Two, a women's team which plays in the Cumbria League, juniors who compete in the under-16, under-14, under-12 and under-10 categories in the Penrith Junior Football League; there is a veteran team, which competes in the Cumbria League. Keswick Rugby Union Football Club, established in 1879, plays at Davidson Park; it has teams that play in the Cumbrian League and the Cumbria Rugby Union Raging Bull Competition. The rugby club is involved in the organisation of the Keswick Half Marathon, usually held in the first week of May.

Keswick Tennis Club has grass courts in upper Fitz Park and also runs hard courts on Keswick's Community Sports Area in the lower park area. Keswick Cricket Club was established in the 1880s. Its principal team competes in the North Lancashire and Cumbria Cricket League, Premier Division. The second team plays in the third division of the Eden Valley Cricket League; the club also has junior under-11, under-13, under-15 and women's teams. Keswick Fitz Park Bowls Club was founded in 1882.

In cycling, Keswick hosted the Keswick Bikes Borrowdale Cross of the North West League, second round, in September 2010 for junior riders, an event that was supported by the British Cycling Federation. The same month, the town hosted an activity weekend for children, involving the juniors of the Brooke Steelers Wheelchair Basketball Team, whose senior players who were competing in a 135 mi (217 km) race from Keswick to Penrith to raise money for children's cancer. Keswick is also home to Keswick Croquet Club, Keswick Archers and Greta (Keswick) Junior Badminton Club, for children from eight to 16 years of age. Keswick Leisure Centre is a fitness centre is operated for Cumberland Council by GLL under its Better brand.

Every Saturday morning at 9am, an organised 3.1 mi (5 km) Parkrun takes place at Keswick Railway Path; this is a mostly flat rail trail that follows the route of the former Cockermouth, Keswick and Penrith Railway, passing through woodlands, over historic Victorian bridges and alongside the river Greta to Threlkeld.

Wild swimming can be perform at a number of locations including Derwentwater.
