= Keswick railway station =

Disused railway station in Cumbria, England

Keswick
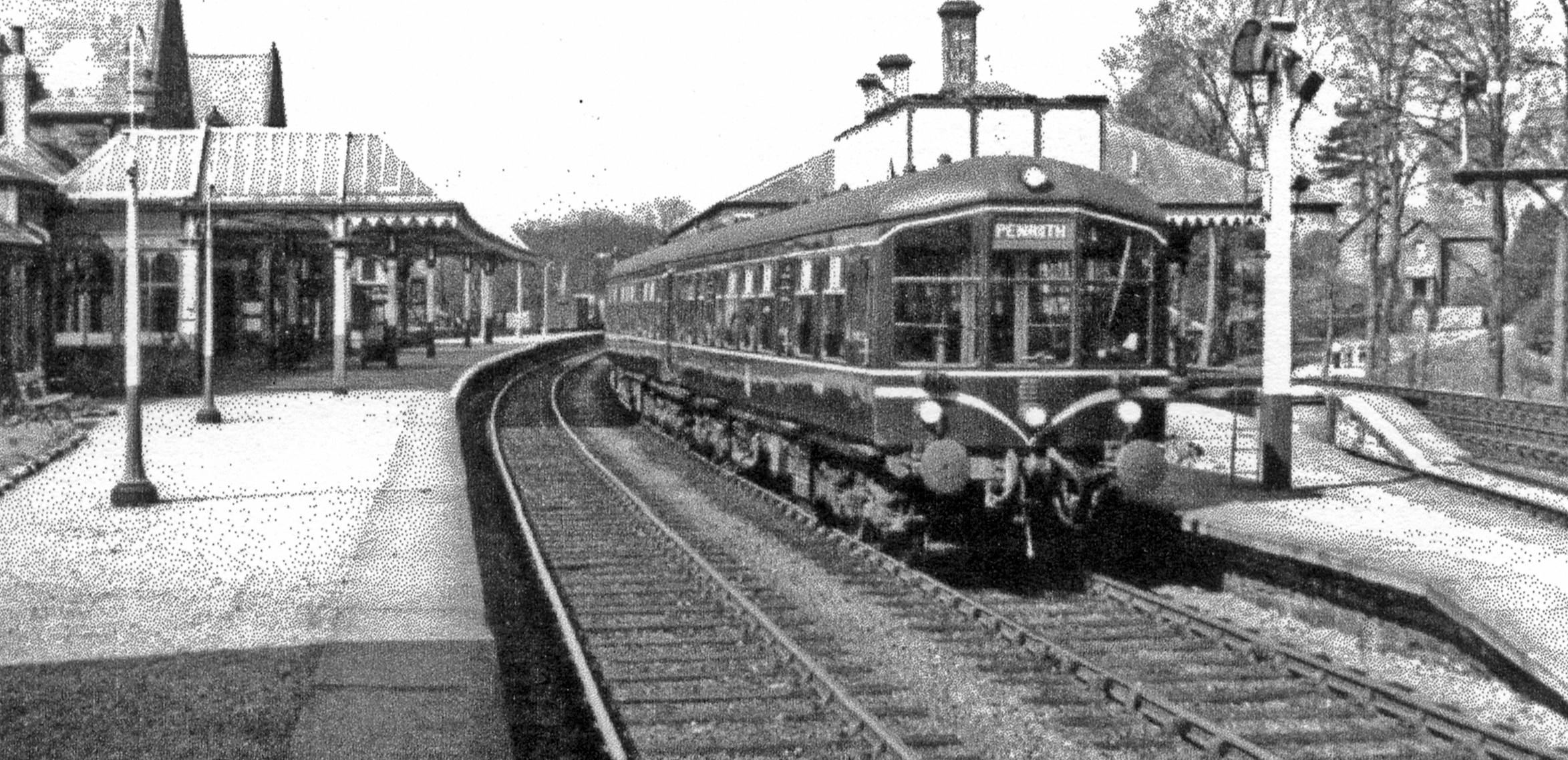
- A new diesel multiple unit at Keswick station, 1956

General information
- Location: Keswick, Cumberland, England
- Coordinates: 54.6038°N 3.1307°W
- Grid reference: NY270237
- Platforms: 2

Other information
- Status: Disused

History
- Original company: Cockermouth, Keswick and Penrith Railway
- Pre-grouping: Cockermouth, Keswick and Penrith Railway
- Post-grouping: London, Midland and Scottish Railway; London Midland Region of British Railways

Key dates
- 2 January 1865: Opened
- 1 June 1964: Closed to goods
- 18 April 1966: All traffic westwards ceased
- 1 July 1968: Station became unstaffed
- 6 March 1972: Final closure to passengers
Location
- Location within the former Allerdale Borough Location within Cumbria

Keswick railway station served the town of Keswick, in Cumberland (now in Cumbria), England, between 1865 and 1972. It was a stop on the Cockermouth, Keswick and Penrith Railway between Penrith and Cockermouth; for much of its existence, it accommodated the offices of the Cockermouth, Keswick and Penrith Railway Company.

== History ==
=== Background ===
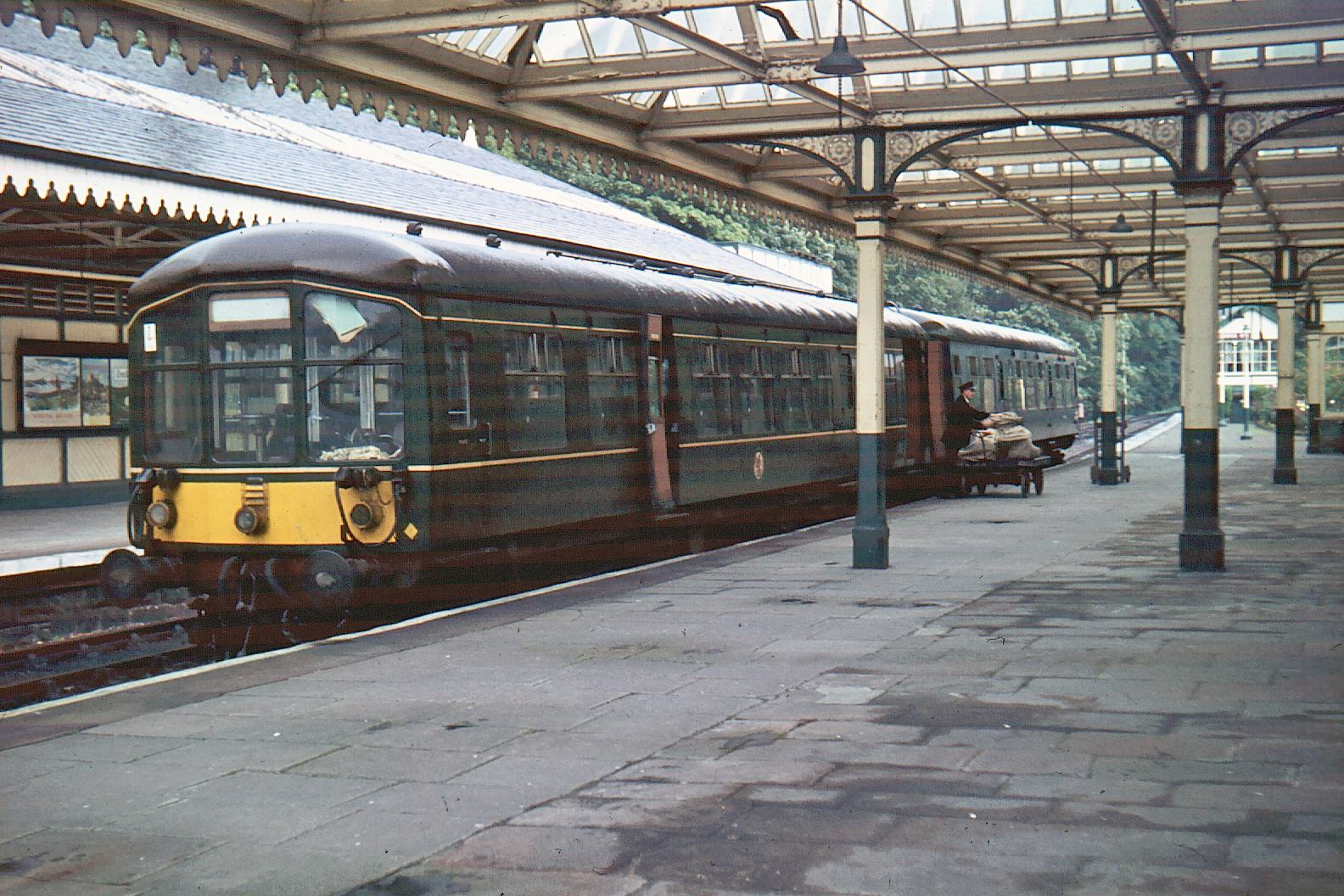
Keswick station, August 1967

On 1 August 1861, the Cockermouth, Keswick and Penrith Railway Company was incorporated in accordance with an Act of Parliament authorising the construction of a railway between Cockermouth and the London and North Western Railway's West Coast Main Line at Penrith. The line's civil engineering works were designed by Thomas Bouch, including Keswick station.

In 1862, the company's stations committee decided that the station should accommodate its main offices. The station was built on land purchased from Roger Eustace Le Fleming, about 0.3 miles (0.5 km) to the north of Keswick town centre. The station, around midway along the line, was built on an east–west alignment.

Following competitive bidding, the company accepted contractor George Bolton & Son's tender of £3,500 to build the station. In November 1863, the works committee approved the construction of additional facilities including an engine shed, a carriage shed capable of accommodating at least six carriages and a turntable. A portico was added to the station design before work commenced.

=== Design and operations ===
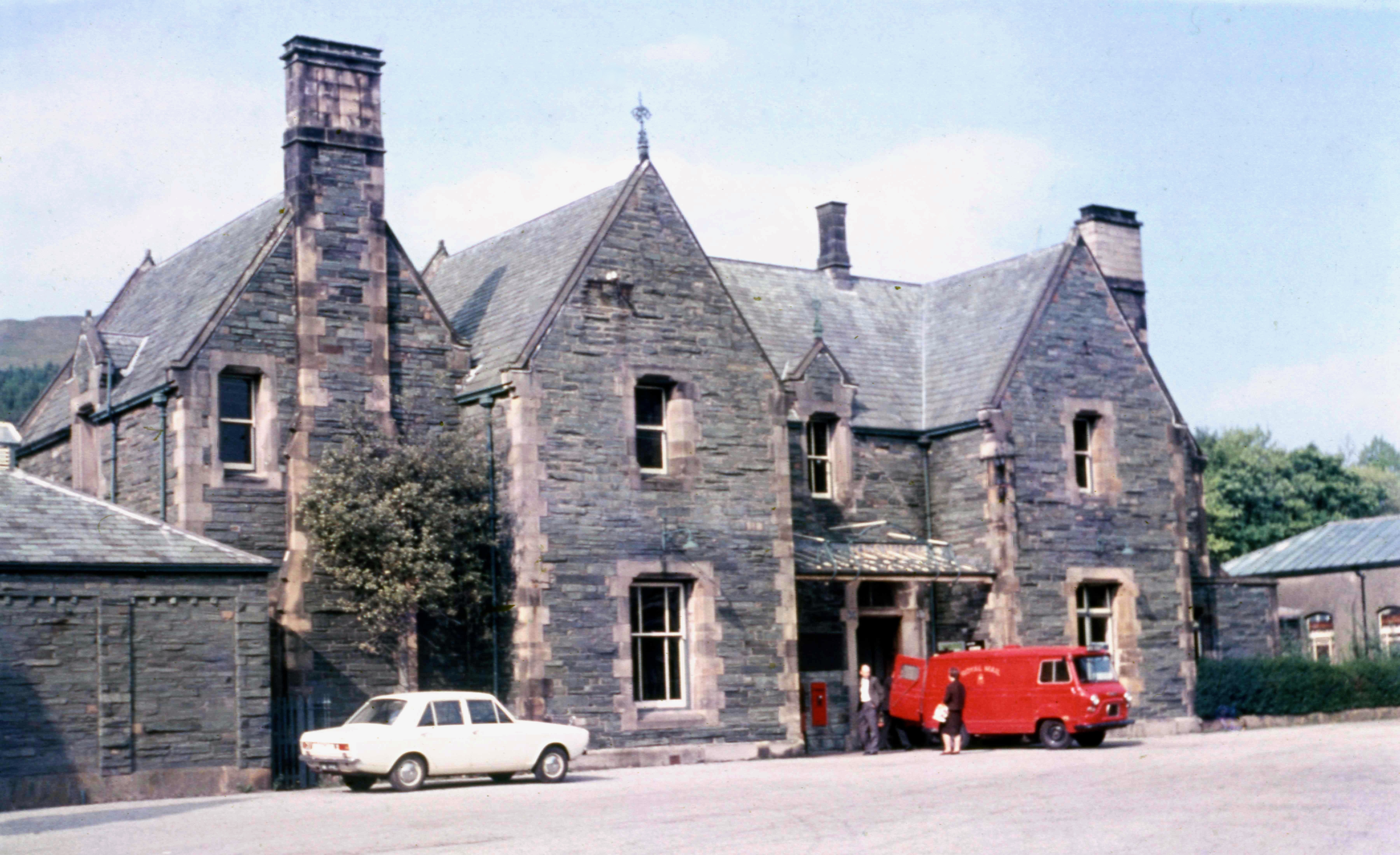
Two-storey building of local stone, 1970

The station was built with two platforms: the up platform, to accommodate eastbound services, and the down platform for westbound trains. A two-storey building of local stone was constructed on the down platform; its upper storey housed the company's boardroom and offices for the company secretary, train co-ordinator and accountant; the lower storey was occupied by the ticket office, luggage and parcels office, lavatories and waiting rooms. The waiting rooms opened onto the platform, most of which was protected by a glazed roof on top of a cantilevered valance, supported on rows of iron columns. The up platform had a waiting shelter and a large rectangular water tank.

A goods station was established to the west of the station. In 1865, a refreshments room opened but, by April 1875, the space it occupied was used as a first class waiting room and lavatory. In 1873, to provide better means of access between the platforms, a subway was built. A year later, a crane was installed at the east end of the up platform to ease freight loading/unloading.

Around 1870, W.H. Smith & Son opened a bookstall; it was open until 1905. Between 1909 and 1921, newsagents Wyman & Sons managed the bookstall; local stationer A. Chaplin took over until around 1931 and Wymans then managed bookstalls on both platforms until the 1950s.

In 1880, Cowans Sheldon & Company of Carlisle enlarged the water tank on the up platform. By 1893, the island platform was relocated to a more northerly position where a single-storey timber building with brick chimneys, a slate roof and cantilevered valances supported by iron columns was constructed.

=== Decline and closure ===
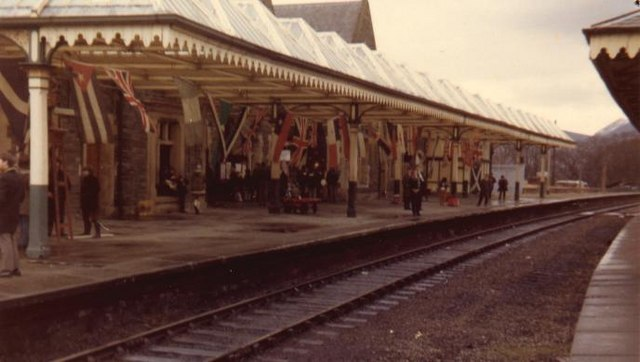
The station on the day it was closed, March 1972

As a result of the Beeching cuts, the railway line beyond Keswick to Cockermouth and Workington was closed on 18 April 1966. Keswick was left at the end of a single line branch from Penrith. Six years later, British Rail closed the line and the station on 6 March 1972.

After its closure, most of the structures, including the island platform and its building and water tank, were demolished. The land was used as a car park for a nearby hotel; the building on the down platform has been integrated into the hotel. In 1976, the building was recognised as a Grade II listed building.

Preceding station	Disused railways	Following station
Braithwaite	Cockermouth, Keswick and Penrith Railway	Threlkeld

== The site today ==
Keswick Railway Path, a rail trail owned by the Lake District National Park Authority, has been established since the line's closure. It starts at the station site, crosses several bridges along a gentle climbing route of roughly 3.5 miles (5.6 km) and ends at the mining museum, east of Threlkeld car park.

The building on the down platform continues to form part of Keswick Hotel.

A movement to reopen the station and the line to Penrith has conducted studies into its viability.

== See also ==
- Listed buildings in Keswick, Cumbria
