= Listed buildings in Hutton, Cumbria =

Hutton is a civil parish in Westmorland and Furness, Cumbria, England. It contains 13 listed buildings that are recorded in the National Heritage List for England. Of these, one is listed at Grade I, the highest of the three grades, and the others are at Grade II, the lowest grade. The parish contains the villages of Hutton and Penruddock and the surrounding countryside. The most important building in the parish is Hutton John, originally a fortified tower house and later a country house; this and associated structures are listed. Apart from a church, all the other listed buildings are houses, farmhouses and farm buildings.

== Key ==
Grade	Criteria
I	Buildings of exceptional interest, sometimes considered to be internationally important
II	Buildings of national importance and special interest

== Buildings ==
Name and location	Photograph	Date	Notes	Grade
Hutton John and barn 54.63457°N 2.86947°W		Late 14th century	Originating as a fortified tower house it was converted by successive alterations and extensions into a country house. It is built in pink sandstone and calciferous sandstone and has green slate roofs. The two-storey tower has very thick walls, a chamfered plinth, a vaulted basement, and a battlemented parapet. To the right is a three-storey five bay wing, at the rear is another three-storey five-bay wing, and with the adjoining barn they form three sides of a courtyard. Other features include a signal turret, a three-storey gabled porch, and windows of various types, some of which are heart-shaped.	I
Stoddah Farmhouse and barns 54.63338°N 2.90787°W	—	Mid 17th century	The farmhouse and barn have green slate roofs. The house is in rendered stone, with two storeys and three bays. It has a central gabled porch, and the windows are a mix of sashes, casements, and fire windows. The house is flanked by two-bay barns in slate rubble, both with segmental-headed cart entrances and doorways with stone surrounds.	II
Garden terrace wall, Hutton John; 54.63440°N 2.86894°W	—	1662	The wall encloses three sides of the garden, forming a terrace in front of the house, and is in sandstone The wall beside the dovecote is higher, and contains a doorway with a Tudor arch and a lintel that is inscribed, dated and contains three coats of arms. Elsewhere the wall is lower with shaped coping, and urns on the ends.	II
Dovecote, Hutton John; 54.63437°N 2.86941°W	—	Mid to late 17th century	The dovecote was later converted into a smithy. It is rectangular, in sandstone, and has a green slate roof with coped gables. The building has plank doors, casement windows, ventilation slits, and a triangular opening in the gable, now blocked, but retaining stone shelves.	II
Ivy Cottage; 54.63922°N 2.89226°W	—	Mid or late 17th century	A stuccoed sandstone house with a Welsh slate roof. There are two storeys, three bays, and a left lean-to extension. On the front are sash windows, and at the rear is a plank door and a central semicircular staircase projection.	II
High Farmhouse; 54.63920°N 2.89447°W	—	1695	The farm is in mixed slate and sandstone rubble, with quoins and a green slate roof. There are two storeys, three bays, and a rear outshut with a 19th-century extension. The central doorway has a chamfered stone surround and a shaped dated lintel. The windows date from the 20th century and are in 19th-century surrounds, and there are blocked fire windows.	II
Bank Side Farmhouse and barn 54.64240°N 2.88620°W	—	Early 18th century	The farmhouse and barn have a green slate roof. The house is rendered, and has two storeys, three bays, and a rear outshut. The door has a stone surround, the sash windows have chamfered stone surrounds, and there is a fire window. The barn to the right is in sandstone and has two bays, a segmental-headed entrance, a plank door, and a loft doorway.	II
Greenclose and barns 54.63022°N 2.89219°W	—	Early 18th century	The farmhouse and barns are in sandstone with a green slate roof. The house has two storeys, three bays, and a two-storey single-bay rear extension, giving a T-shaped plan. The house has a doorway with a stone surround, and two-light mullioned windows. The barns flank the farmhouse and have plank doors in stone surrounds.	II
Barn, Viaduct Cottage; 54.64333°N 2.88615°W	—	1736	A sandstone barn with quoins, a green slate roof, two storeys and four bays. It contains a large segmental-headed cart entrance, smaller doorways, one with a dated lintel, a loft doorway, and an oval vent on the left side.	II
Holly Bank and former barn 54.64184°N 2.88602°W	—	1751	Originally a farmhouse and barn, later a private house, it is rendered and has a green slate roof. The house has two storeys, four bays, and a rear outshut. The doorway has a stone surround, and the windows, which are sashes, have chamfered stone surrounds. The barn to the right is slightly lower, and its left two bays have been incorporated into the house; to the right of these is a large segment-headed cart entrance.	II
Viaduct Cottage; 54.64342°N 2.88650°W	—	1754	A stone house on a chamfered plinth, with an eaves cornice and a green slate roof. There are two storeys and four bays, and a lower two-storey two-bay extension to the left. In the main part is a doorway with a stone surround, a lintel with a false keystone, and a cornice. The windows are sashes in chamfered stone surrounds. In the extension there is a plank door, sash windows in stone surrounds, and a fixed casement window.	II
Springbank; 54.62245°N 2.91477°W	—	Late 18th century	A house in slate rubble with dressings in calciferous sandstone, quoins, and a green slate roof. It has two storeys and five bays. The central door has a quoined surround, there is a French window, also with a quoined surround, and sash windows in stone surrounds.	II
United Reformed Church; 54.63917°N 2.89167°W		1789	Originally a Presbyterian meeting house, it is rendered on a stone plinth and has a green slate roof. The church has a single storey, three bays, and a 19th-century sandstone gabled porch containing a door with a pointed arch. The windows are sashes in round-headed surrounds with impost blocks and false keystones.	II
