= Embleton railway station =

Former railway station in Cumberland, England

Coordinates: 54.6597°N 3.2988°W

Embleton
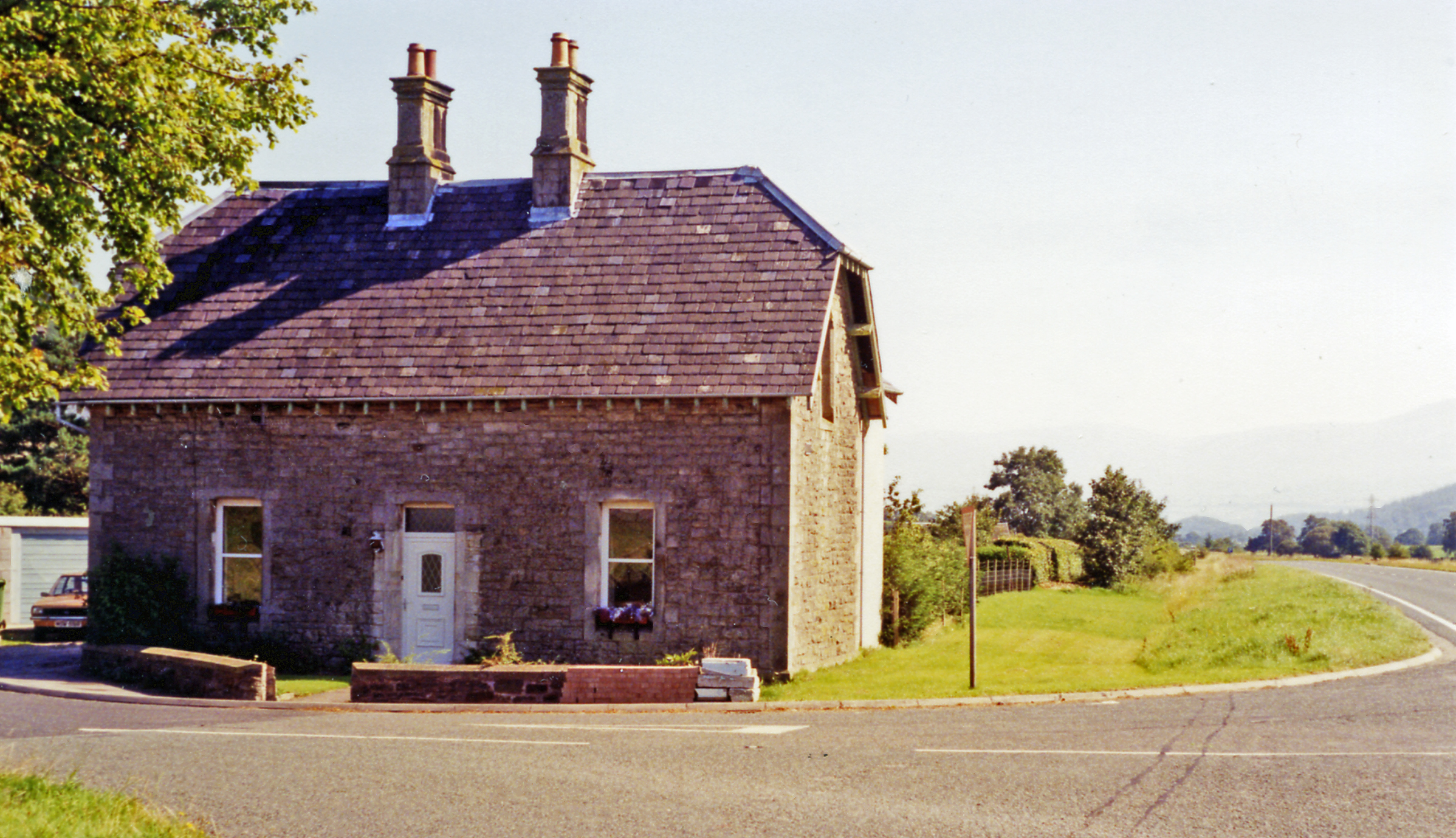
- Site of the station in 1991

General information
- Location: Cumberland; England
- Platforms: 1

Other information
- Status: Disused

History
- Original company: Cockermouth, Keswick and Penrith Railway
- Pre-grouping: Cockermouth, Keswick and Penrith Railway
- Post-grouping: London, Midland and Scottish Railway

Key dates
- 2 January 1865: Opened
- 15 September 1958: Closed
Location
- Location within the former Allerdale Borough Location within Cumbria

Embleton railway station was situated on the Cockermouth, Keswick and Penrith Railway between Penrith and Cockermouth in Cumberland (now in Cumbria), England. The station served the village of Embleton. The station opened to passenger traffic on 2 January 1865, and closed on 15 September 1958.

Two camping coaches were positioned here by the London Midland Region in 1954.

All trace of the station building has gone although the Station Master's house survives as a private residence on the side of the A66.

Preceding station	Disused railways	Following station
Cockermouth	Cockermouth, Keswick and Penrith Railway	Bassenthwaite Lake
