= Cockermouth railway station (Cockermouth and Workington Railway) =

Disused railway station in Cumbria, England

Cockermouth (C&W)

General information
- Location: Cockermouth, Cumberland; England
- Coordinates: 54.6637°N 3.3743°W
- Grid reference: NY114307
- Platforms: 1

Other information
- Status: Disused

History
- Original company: Cockermouth & Workington Railway
- Pre-grouping: London and North Western Railway
- Post-grouping: London Midland and Scottish Railway

Key dates
- 28 April 1847: Opened
- 2 January 1865: Closed to passengers and replaced by new station
- 1964: Closed completely
Location
- Location within the former Allerdale Borough Location within Cumbria

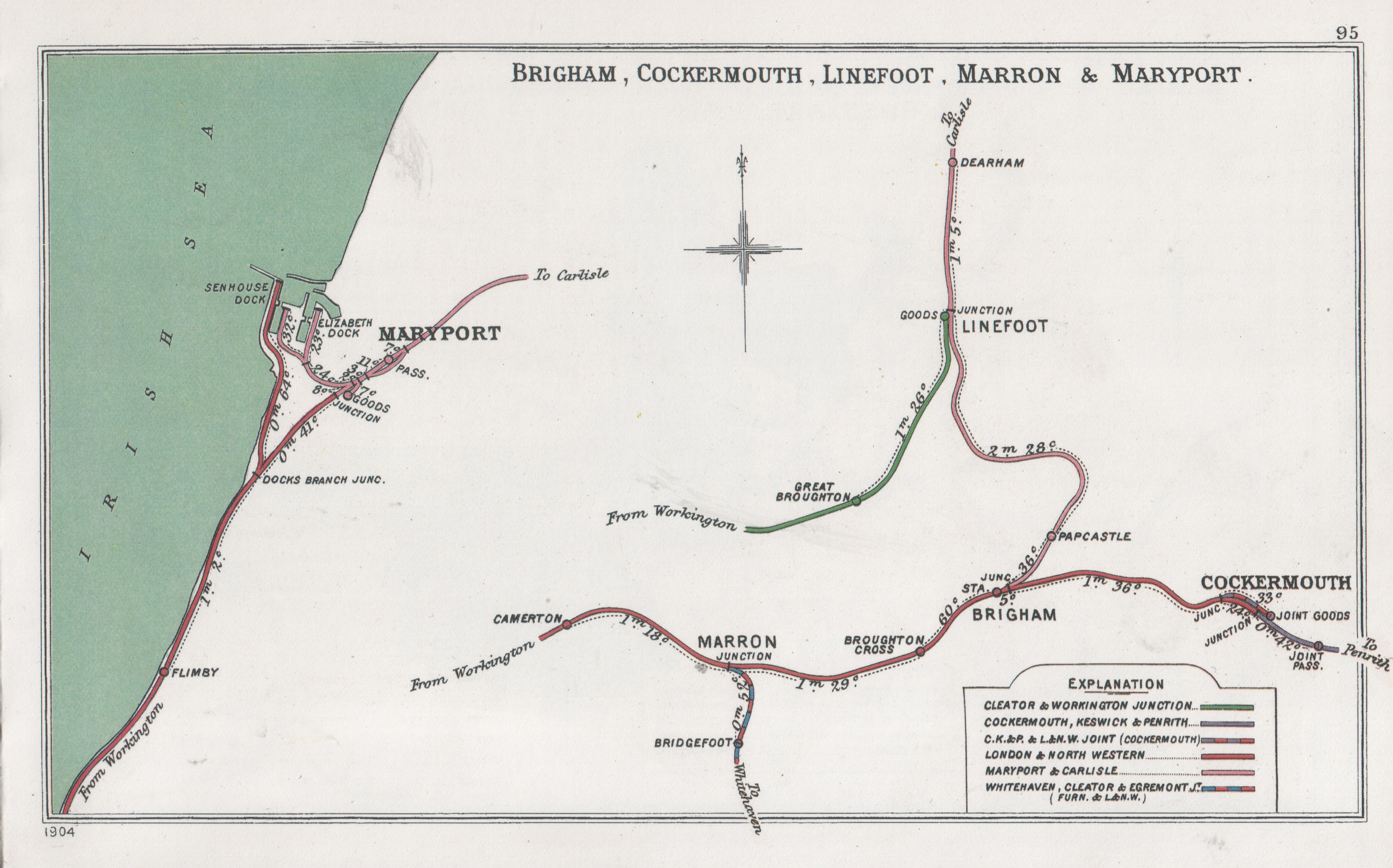
A 1904 Railway Clearing House Junction Diagram showing (right) railways in the vicinity of the station

The original Cockermouth railway station was the eastern terminus of the Cockermouth & Workington Railway. It served the town of Cockermouth, Cumbria, England.

== History ==
The station opened on 28 April 1847. It closed on 2 January 1865, being replaced by the Cockermouth, Keswick and Penrith Railway station when the line was extended eastwards to Penrith using a different alignment.

After closure to passengers the station remained in use as a goods station until 1964. The station area included an engine shed which was opened on 28 April 1847, extended in 1858 and closed in 1876, after which it was converted for use as a goods shed. The shed was demolished in the mid-1990s.

Preceding station	Disused railways	Following station
Terminus	Cockermouth & Workington Railway	Brigham; Line and station closed

== See also ==
- Cockermouth, Keswick and Penrith Railway
