= Troutbeck railway station =

Former railway station in Cumberland, England

Coordinates: 54.6350°N 2.9463°W

Troutbeck

General information
- Location: Troutbeck, Westmorland and Furness; England
- Platforms: 2

Other information
- Status: Disused

History
- Original company: Cockermouth, Keswick and Penrith Railway
- Pre-grouping: Cockermouth, Keswick and Penrith Railway
- Post-grouping: London, Midland and Scottish Railway; London Midland Region of British Railways

Key dates
- 2 January 1865: Opened
- 6 March 1972: Closed
Location
- Location within the former Eden District Location within Cumbria

Troutbeck railway station was situated on the Cockermouth, Keswick and Penrith Railway between Penrith and Cockermouth in Cumberland (now in Cumbria), England. The station served the hamlet of Troutbeck. It opened to passenger traffic on 2 January 1865, and closed on 6 March 1972.

Preceding station	Disused railways	Following station
Threlkeld	Cockermouth, Keswick and Penrith Railway	Penruddock
