= Threlkeld railway station =

Former railway station in Cumberland, England

Threlkeld
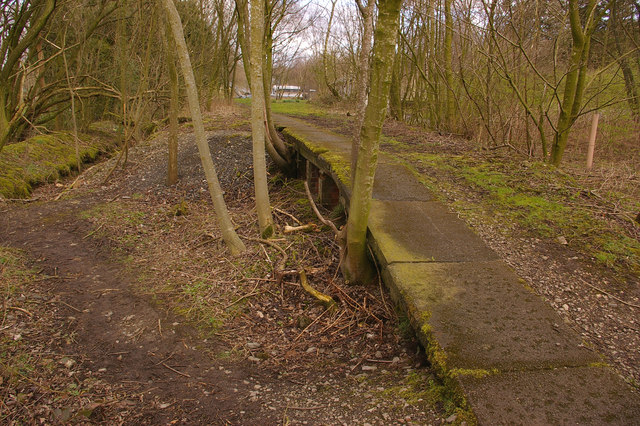
- Threlkeld railway station in 2008

General information
- Location: England
- Coordinates: 54.6118°N 3.0536°W
- Platforms: 2 (island)

Other information
- Status: Disused

History
- Original company: Cockermouth, Keswick and Penrith Railway
- Pre-grouping: London and North Western Railway
- Post-grouping: London, Midland and Scottish Railway; London Midland Region of British Railways

Key dates
- 2 January 1865: Opened
- 6 March 1972: Closed
Location

Threlkeld railway station was situated on the Cockermouth, Keswick and Penrith Railway between Penrith and Cockermouth in Cumbria, England. The station served the village of Threlkeld. The station opened to passenger traffic on 2 January 1865, and closed on 6 March 1972.

Preceding station	Disused railways	Following station
Keswick	Cockermouth, Keswick and Penrith Railway	Troutbeck
