= Cockermouth, Keswick and Penrith Railway =

English railway company

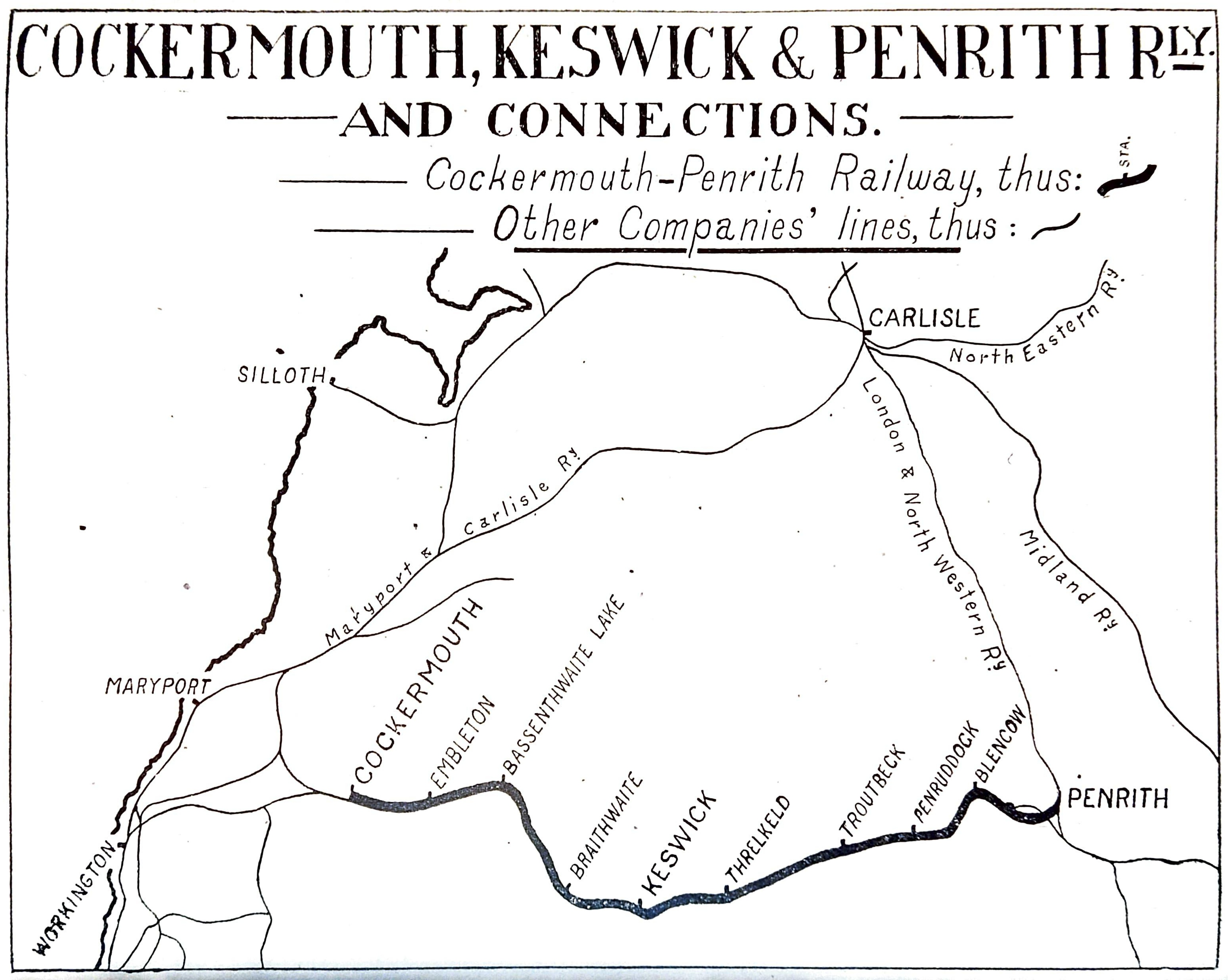
- 1920 map of the railway

Technical
- Track gauge: 4 ft 8 1/2 in (1,435 mm)
- Length: 30 miles 65 chains (49.6 km) (1919)
- Track length: 49 miles 15.5 chains (79.17 km) (1919)

The Cockermouth, Keswick and Penrith Railway (CK&PR) was an English railway company incorporated by act of Parliament on 1 August 1861, to build a line connecting the town of Cockermouth with the London and North Western Railway (LNWR) West Coast Main Line at Penrith. Arrangements for the use of the stations at each end (Cockermouth was already served by the Cockermouth and Workington Railway (C&WR)) were included. Passenger and goods traffic was worked by the LNWR and mineral traffic by the North Eastern Railway, both of whom had shares in the company (the NER inheriting its holding from the Stockton and Darlington Railway, which had encouraged the promotion of the line). The line was 31 1/2 miles (50.7 km) in length, and had eight intermediate stations.

== History ==
=== Early development ===
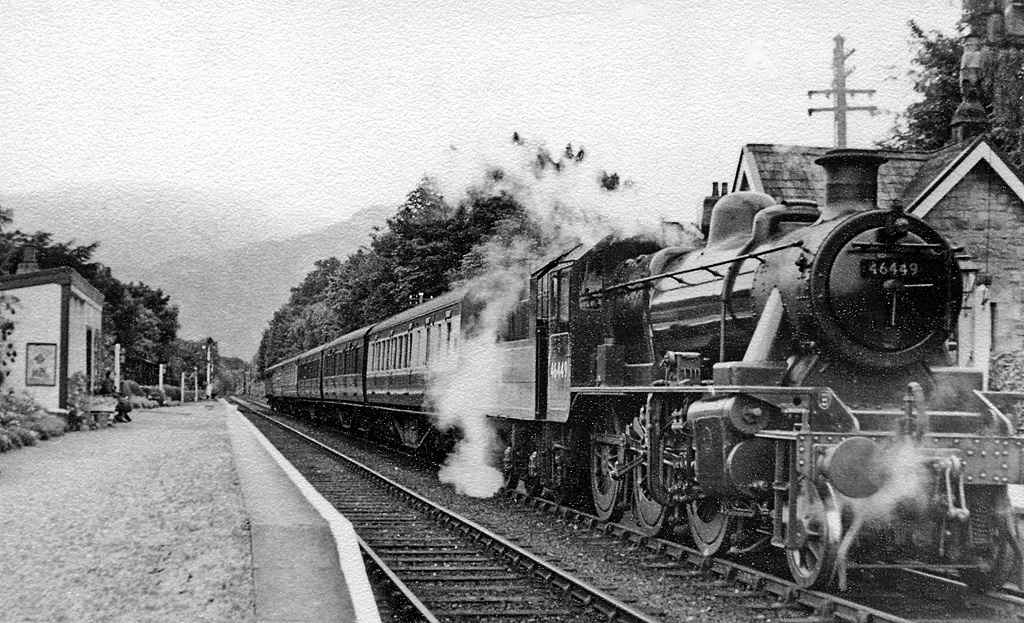
Bassenthwaite Lake station 1951. The 10.15 Manchester Victoria to Workington service

The company had its origins in a meeting at Keswick in September 1860 which agreed to promote a railway linking Keswick to existing railways at Cockermouth (to the West) and Penrith (to the East). A project for a railway linking the towns had been promoted during the Railway Mania, getting as far as a survey of the proposed route, but nothing had come of this (nor of a projected railway from Cockermouth to Windermere via Keswick). Consequently, a Keswick resident complained in 1857, "Here we are buried – shut out from the world, as it were – 15 hours from a morning paper while other people know at an instant what happens at the other end of the kingdom" (Note: Thirty years later, the Yorkshire Post was able to advise that its first edition should be at Keswick station by 9.16 am, having left Leeds at 1.30 am) However, the prospectus for the company argued, what would make the line profitable was not local traffic to Keswick, but potential two-way mineral traffic between the haematite orefield of West Cumberland and the coke-ovens of South Durham.

Cockermouth, Keswick and Penrith Railway Act 1861
- Act of Parliament
- Parliament of the United Kingdom
- Long title: An Act for making a Railway from Cocker mouth to Keswick and Penrith, with a Branch thereout, all in the County of Cumberland; and for other Purposes.
- Citation: 24 & 25 Vict. c. cciii

Dates
- Royal assent: 1 August 1861

Cockermouth, Keswick and Penrith Railway Act 1863
- Act of Parliament
- Parliament of the United Kingdom
- Long title: An Act to confer further Powers on the Cockermouth, Keswick, and Penrith Railway Company, in relation to their Undertaking; to enable the London and North-western and the Stockton and Darlington Railway Companies to subscribe thereto; and for other Purposes relating thereto, and to the Cockermouth and Workington Railway.
- Citation: 26 & 27 Vict. c. cviii

Dates
- Royal assent: 29 June 1863

Text of statute as originally enacted

Cockermouth, Keswick, and Penrith Railway Act 1894
- Act of Parliament
- Parliament of the United Kingdom
- Long title: An Act to confer further powers upon the Cockermouth, Keswick, and Penrith Railway Company, and for other purposes.
- Citation: 57 & 58 Vict. c. v

Dates
- Royal assent: 1 June 1894

Text of statute as originally enacted

The project was supported by the London and North Western Railway (whose line would be joined at Penrith), and by the Stockton and Darlington Railway which had been behind a series of lines engineered by Thomas Bouch which together gave access from South Durham to the West Coast Main Line at Clifton just south of Penrith. The Cockermouth and Workington Railway, with which the CK&PR was to link at its western end, initially intended to support the CK&PR directly, but was not in a financial position to do so; instead many of the C&W directors took substantial shareholdings in the new line, with some sitting on its board. The company's bill was unopposed, and the Cockermouth, Keswick and Penrith Railway Act 1861 (24 & 25 Vict. c. cciii) received its royal assent in August 1861.

=== Construction and opening ===
Work on the line began May 1862, the first sod being cut at Great Crosthwaite by the company chairman. The directors were able to make inspection trips to Keswick from either end of the line in May–June 1864; on their trip from Cockermouth they were accompanied by goods waggons, thereafter Keswick was "supplied with coal by rail from the Workington pits" (implying that the Cockermouth-Keswick section of the line was de facto open for mineral traffic). The line was officially opened for goods traffic on 1 November 1864; mineral traffic may have been running over it from 26 October 1864.

On 29 September 1864 passenger trains had been run from either end of the line to Keswick for an agricultural show there 'though the line is not yet officially open, owing to the punctilios of a certain government official' (free tickets were issued by the contractor for the line and the Cockermouth and Workington Railway lent carriages and staff). The Penrith-Keswick mail coach had ceased to run in mid-November 'being knocked off the road by ... the Railway Engine', but the railway was not officially opened for passenger traffic until 2 January 1865. Trains ran to and from a new joint station at Cockermouth. At first, they merely connected there with the C&WR service to Workington, but by April passenger trains were timetabled to work through from Penrith to Whitehaven along the CK&PR/C&WR route. (Note: Up to 1871 on weekdays, only one (early morning) 'Parliamentary' train a day carried third-class passengers, and the Cockermouth-Penrith 'Parliamentary' left before the Parliamentary from Whitehaven/Workington reached Cockermouth. In 1872 the LNWR (and hence the CK&PR) followed the Midland Railway in allowing 'third-class by all trains'; consequently, the CK&PR chairman complained, in the first full half-year the CK&PR lost 20,000 second-class passengers and gained 40,000 third-class passengers, for a net increase in passenger revenue of £30. After a year's trial, the CK&PR abandoned 'third class by all trains'; its re-adoption at the start of June 1878 had much the same effect as before; but this time the board thought the change inevitable))

=== Operation ===
The CK&PR had agreed with its sponsoring railways that the LNWR was to work passenger and goods traffic on the line (receiving one-third of earnings) whilst the S&D was to work mineral traffic (the S&D to receive 35% of earnings, and the CK&PR to pay for waggons). The CK&PR also provided non-moving staff. The line was laid out by Bouch with the object of the utmost economy; although the bridges were permanent (stone and iron rather than timber trestles). The CK&PR joined the West Coast Main Line by a north-facing junction at Penrith; trains to or from the south would have had to go to Penrith and reverse direction, had the NER not built a 'loop line' (at Red Hills, south of Penrith) giving a south to west junction. The line was single throughout; when the LNWR recommended instead that the line be built from the start as double-track, the CK&PR board rejected this advice, preferring to delay doubling until actual receipts justified it. Furthermore, according to a pseudonymous contemporary critic, the engineering of the line, and the purchase of land made no provision for future doubling: consequently the line was "really a miserable affair, anything but a first-class line as it was originally boasted to be. Everything connected with it has been sacrificed to cheapness, which in this undertaking, as everyone must see, has been unquestionably carried too far. The line is single, the bridges are single; everything appertaining or belonging to it is single, and, strange to say, land has been taken up for a single line only."

With the adoption of 'absolute block' working in 1892 (at the insistence of the Board of Trade), the section between Thelkeld and Troutbeck had to be converted into two blocks (by the addition of a signal box just to the west of the Mosedale Viaduct) to prevent excessive delays . The line was eventually doubled over the heavy gradients between Threlkeld and Red Hills: doubling between Threlkeld and Troutbeck (west of the summit) was in effect by 1896; extension of this to Penruddock was undertaken in 1900, along with doubling east of the summit (Red Hills to Blencow) and was not completed until spring 1901. (Note: cf. Joy (p212-214) who has Red Hills to Blencow the first section doubled, and all doubling completed in 1900. The Ordnance Survey revised the 6-inch maps of the area in c. 1898; the revised maps show doubling from Threlkeld to Troutbeck station and doubling of the NER 'loop line' from the West Coast Main Line to Red Hills Junction, but the CK&PR is shown as single all the way between Troutbeck and Red Hills)

=== Mineral traffic ===
It had been predicted that the mineral traffic over the line would (on its own) ensure dividends of at least 5% as soon as the line opened, but this proved to have been optimistic. The line cost more to build than anticipated, and the mineral traffic was not as large as predicted. The profitability was also low; through rates were effectively governed by those set by the Maryport and Carlisle Railway. These were deliberately set by the M&C at underpriced levels (as low as 5/8d per mile) which should have deterred the construction of competing lines. Unlike the M&CR, the CP&KR had severe gradients (westbound a climb of 1 in 70 between Penrith and Blencow, eastbound 1 in 62 1/2 between Threlkeld and Troutbeck) and therefore higher running costs; a CK&PR chairman claimed that a locomotive could haul on the M&CR a train three times as heavy as it could haul over the CK&PR. (Note: There were two news-worthy accidents to west-bound goods trains in 1889; a derailment at Bassenthwaite Lake and a runaway of waggons from Blencow to Penrith; in both cases the train (30-40 waggons) was double-headed) Nor did the CK&PR have the lucrative local colliery traffic of the M&CR. Passenger and goods traffic on the line were, however, sufficient to make the CK&PR profitable; eventually passenger traffic became the main revenue as mineral traffic declined further. Technological improvements in steelmaking reduced the dependence of the British steel industry on Cumbrian haematite. Blast furnaces were established close to the orefield, and processed much of the ore locally. Although, initially, they needed to import coke to do so, later improvements in coke-making allowed them to increasingly use coke made from local coal; considerable volumes of Welsh coke also began to reach West Cumbria by sea. Increased foreign production of iron and steel meant a loss of foreign markets and over-capacity in the British iron and steel industry.

=== Passenger traffic ===
Tourist traffic was a vital contributor to passenger revenue. (Note: The Carlisle Patriot reported every week on page 2 railway traffic returns for the previous week (including passenger numbers). Aggregating weekly returns, in 1886, during the summer season (June–September inclusive) the CK&PR handled on average 5600 passengers a week with average passenger revenue of £386/week: in 1895 6100 passengers/week, passenger revenue £473/week. In February - April inclusive of 1886, passenger numbers averaged 2300/week and passenger revenues £172/week; in 1895 2500 passengers a week and £207/week) In 1863, a shareholders' meeting authorised the expenditure of £11,000 on the construction of a first-class railway hotel; such a hotel, the directors had urged, was essential if Keswick was to compete with the Scottish lochs and Switzerland. By 1865, when the hotel had been built, it was evident that the capital cost of the railway had overrun to an alarming extent; the LNWR advised strongly (and the NER concurred) that railway hotels were not profitable when run by railway companies; furthermore it was now thought that the hotel needed to be extended before anyone could run it profitably. The hotel was therefore sold to a separate company, floated for the purpose, with a considerably overlapping directorate, and with railway shareholders being given first refusal on the hotel company shares. (Note: not as Joy (p211) says leased to it, although the railway company was not to be paid until 1867, the hotel company paying 5% interest on the purchase price meanwhile. In the event the hotel company share issue was undersubscribed, and the purchase money was only found by borrowing on the strength of personal guarantees from the hotel company directors.) Keswick also attracted day trips (works outings, Sunday school treats) from Carlisle and industrial West Cumberland, and was a popular venue for Temperance demonstrations, although much depended on the weather:

Soon after the departure from Carlisle the rain commenced to fall in heavy showers, and continued throughout the whole of the day without the slightest perceptible abatement. Between eleven and twelve o'clock the whole of the excursion trains had arrived, and the streets of Keswick were literally crowded by an immense concourse of people, whose wet and weary appearance indicated the entire absence of enjoyment. It was impossible to look upon the drifting multitude without feelings of compassion. Those local places of interest which have given to Keswick an attractive reputation were unvisited, and the people seemed to wander from the tea rooms to the public-houses during the whole day … If the weather had been propitious, the Demonstration would have proved a marked success, for seldom has such a large number of people accompanied an excursion to Keswick. As the excursionists returned to the station towards evening, a more reliable estimate could be formed of the number present, which was represented by several thousands. Beyond a few expressions of sympathy with some loitering excursionists who missed the homeward train, nothing transpired in the shape of an accident to call forth regret save the serious weather, which reminded many of the not altogether groundless proverb that, "it always rains at Keswick"

=== Ownership ===
In return for subscribing for £25,000 of CK&PR shares, the LNWR had been granted running rights over the CK&PR in perpetuity. Although in the LNWR 'jumped over the head of' the CK&PR to absorb the Cockermouth and Workington Railway, and the Whitehaven Junction Railway in 1866 (almost as soon as they had been connected to the LNWR by the CK&PR), it made no similar offer for the CK&PR until 1890 when it offered to lease the CK&PR for 5%. The CK&PR's dividend had averaged 5% over the last four years, and its board held out for 6%, which the LNWR refused to offer. The LNWR also rebuffed subsequent attempts by the CK&PR to reopen negotiations, and the latter continued to operate as a separate company until the 1923 Grouping, when it was absorbed by the London, Midland and Scottish Railway.

=== Closure ===
The line was closed west of Keswick in April 1966. The Keswick to Penrith section followed suit in March 1972, though freight trains continued to run to Flusco and Blencow, at the eastern end of the line, until the following June.

Keswick Museum and Art Gallery displays many items connected with the railway, including the barrow and spade used in the ceremony to cut the first sod for the railway on 21 May 1862, train tickets from the 19th century, and a platform guard's whistle.

The development of the A66 road used much of the former track path from Cockermouth to beyond Bassenthwaite Lake. Much of the section between Keswick and Penrith, through the National Park, has been made into a cycle and walking route, and is maintained as such by the park authority.

== The future ==
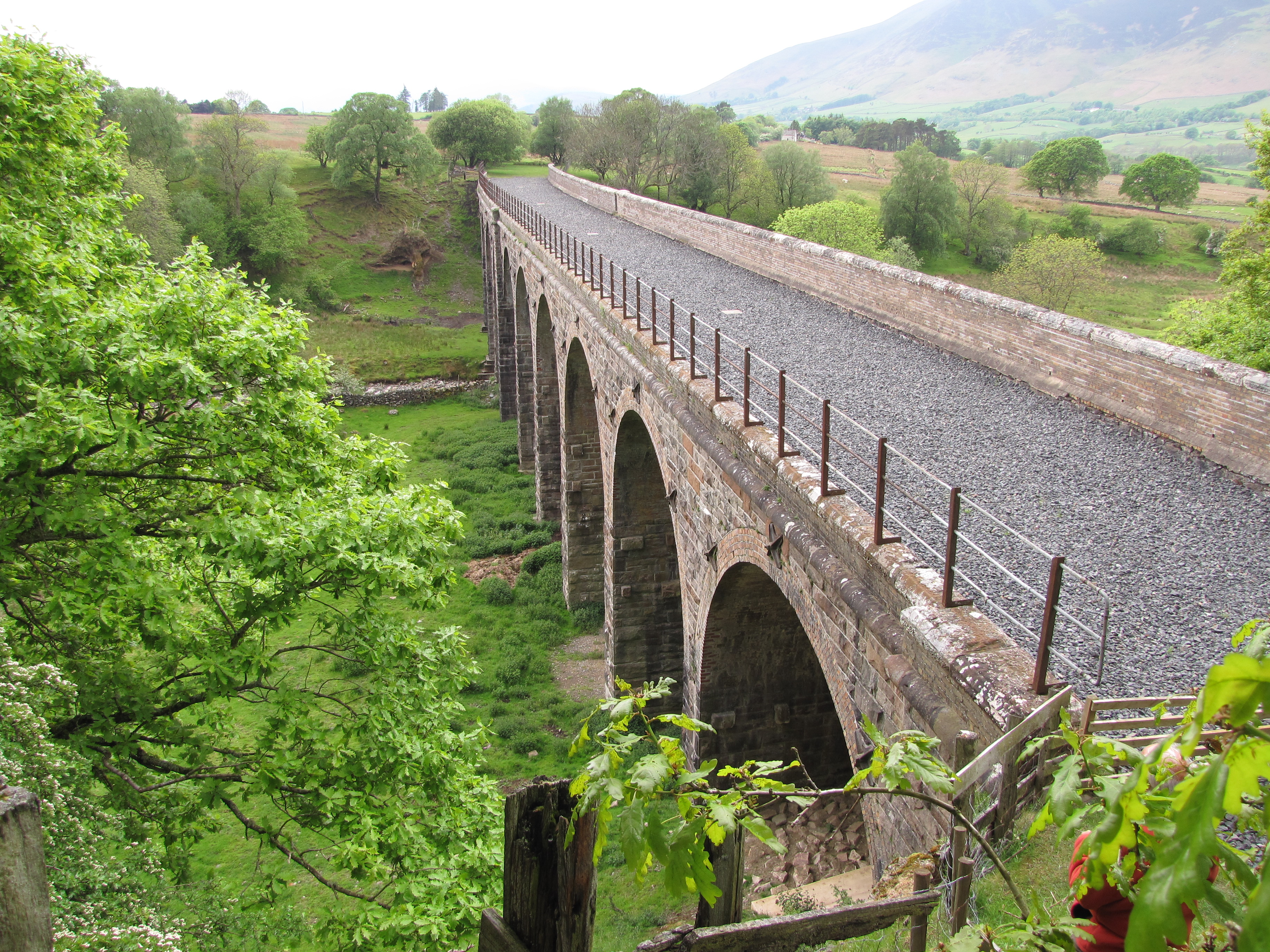
Mosedale viaduct.

There is a proposal to reopen the line as a modern railway and a feasibility study has been commissioned by CKP Railways plc to examine the business case. However, Eden District Council approved development in 2006 at Flusco Business Park to straddle the trackbed. A proposal to demolish the Mosedale Viaduct was cancelled by the British Rail Property Board in 1997 because of the plan to reinstate the line.

The project to reopen the railway has been dealt some serious blows. During floods in 2015, three bridges were damaged or destroyed in Storm Desmond in the Greta gorge. The railway footpath which uses these bridges was restored to service in 2020, but with two lightweight bridges, which makes it even more unlikely that the railway will be opened once more.

In January 2019, Campaign for Better Transport released a report identifying the line which was listed as Priority 2 for reopening. Priority 2 is for those lines which require further development or a change in circumstances (such as housing developments).

In March 2020, a bid was made to the Restoring Your Railway fund to get funds for a feasibility study into reinstating the line. The bid was unsuccessful.

== Railway stations ==
From west to east:

- Cockermouth: a joint station with the Cockermouth and Workington Railway, whose original station became the joint goods station.
- Embleton (initially 'Lambfoot' in local property advertisements)
- Bassenthwaite Lake (initially 'Peel Wyke' in local property advertisements): the line skirted the lake for a considerable distance
- Braithwaite
- Keswick
- Threlkeld
- Troutbeck
- Penruddock
- Blencow
- Penrith
