= Cockermouth railway station =

Former railway station in Cumberland, England

Cockermouth
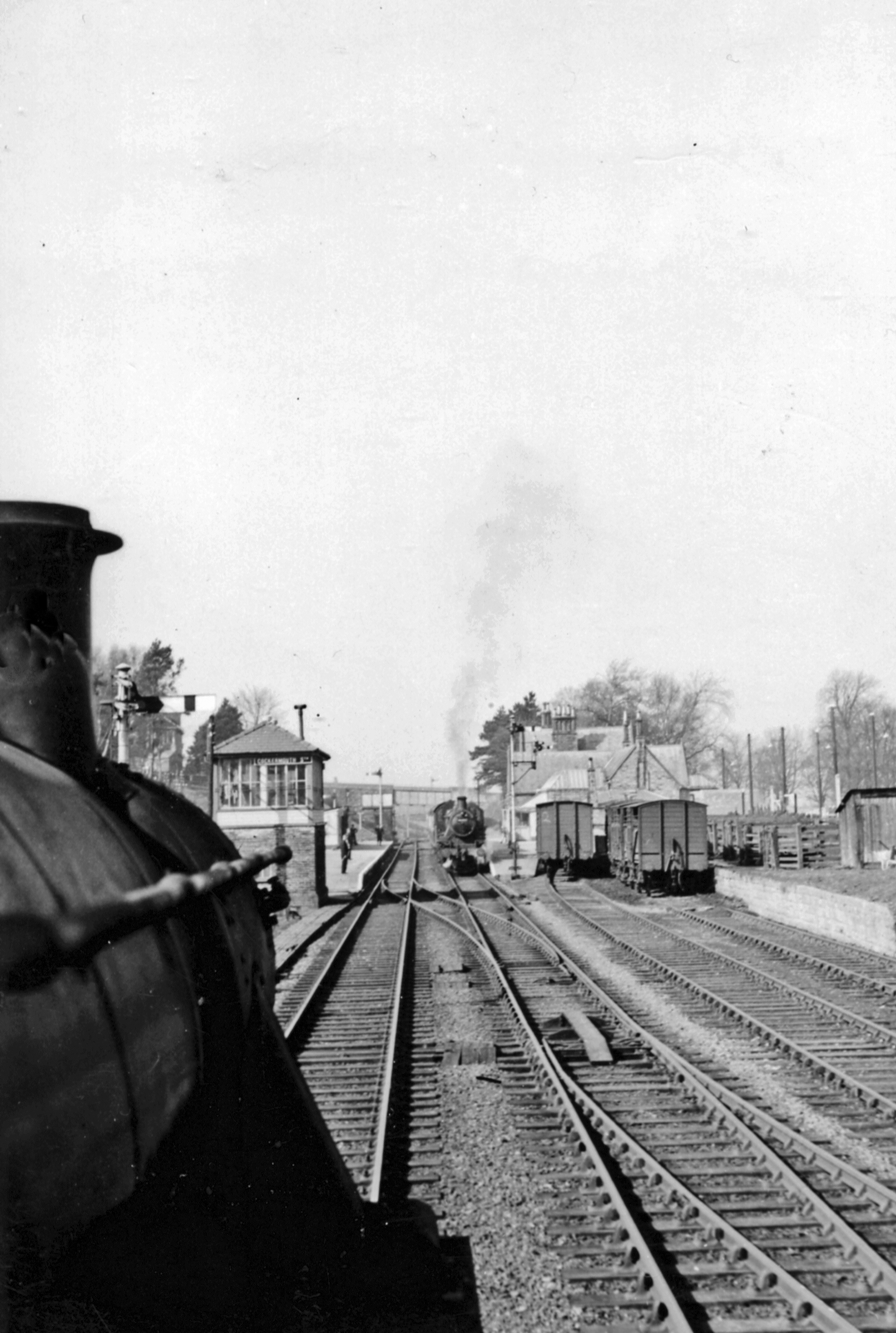
- View from locomotive cab on approach to Cockermouth station in 1953

General information
- Location: Cockermouth, Cumberland; England
- Coordinates: 54.660°N 3.365°W
- Platforms: 2

Other information
- Status: Disused

History
- Original company: Cockermouth, Keswick and Penrith Railway
- Pre-grouping: London and North Western Railway
- Post-grouping: London Midland and Scottish Railway

Key dates
- 2 January 1865: Opened (Replacing older station)
- 18 April 1966 (60 years ago): Closed
Location

Cockermouth railway station was the western terminus of the Cockermouth, Keswick and Penrith Railway; it served the town of Cockermouth, Cumbria, England.

== History ==
The station opened to passenger traffic on 2 January 1865 and closed on 18 April 1966. The station was the second to be built in the town. The original Cockermouth & Workington Railway station closed to passengers when the CK&PR station opened on an altered alignment, though it remained in use as a goods station until 1964.

The latter station was immortalised in 1964 in the song "Slow Train" by Flanders and Swann.

Preceding station	Disused railways	Following station
Terminus	Cockermouth, Keswick and Penrith Railway	Embleton
Terminus	London and North Western Railway; Cockermouth & Workington Railway	Brigham

== The site today ==
All traces of the station are now gone, as the site is now occupied by the Cockermouth Mountain Rescue Base and the Cumbria Fire and Rescue Service.

Running down the left hand side of the Fire Service building is the old trackbed, now a public walkway; many original bridges and features survive to this day.

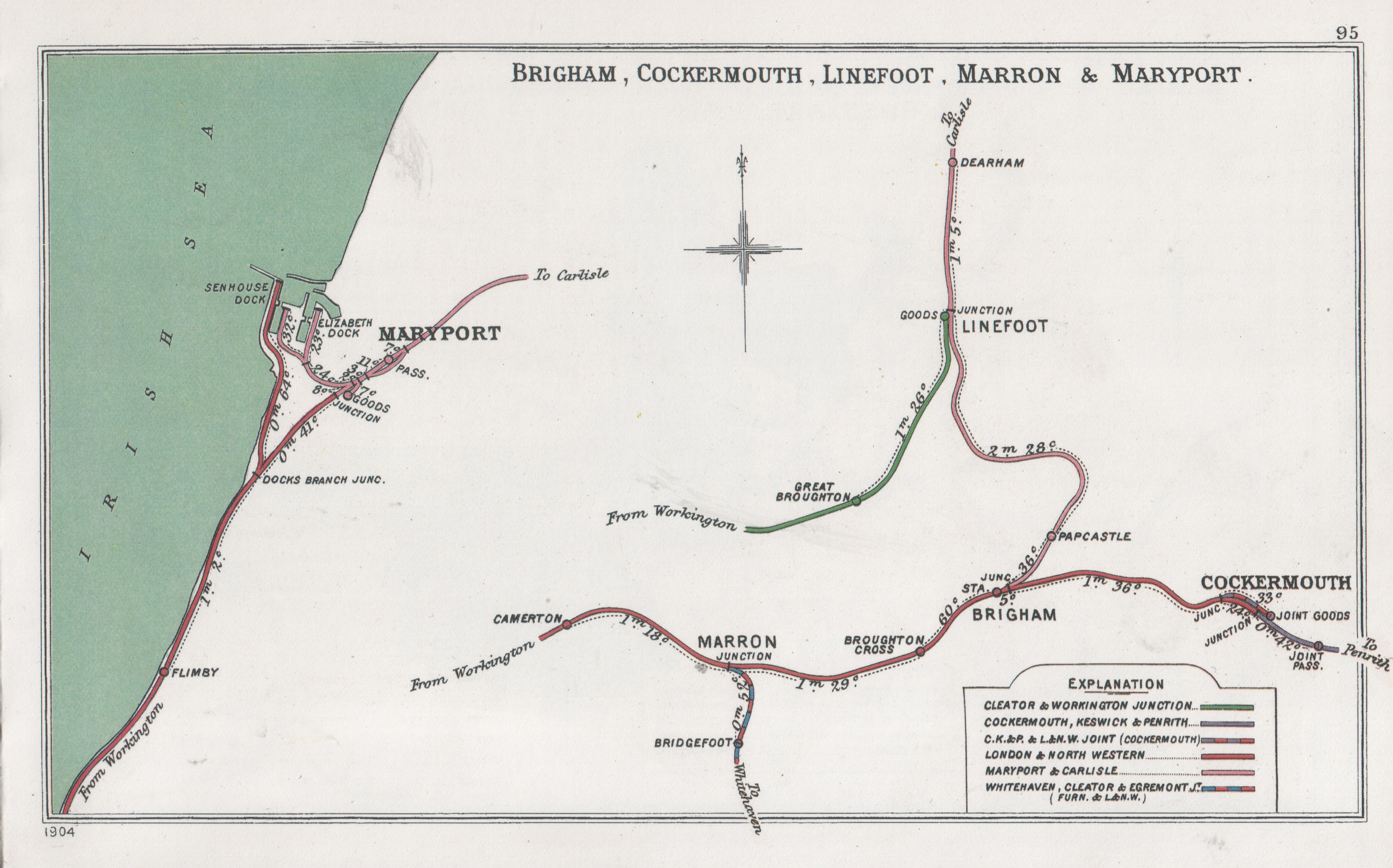
A 1904 Railway Clearing House junction diagram, showing railways in the vicinity of the station to the right

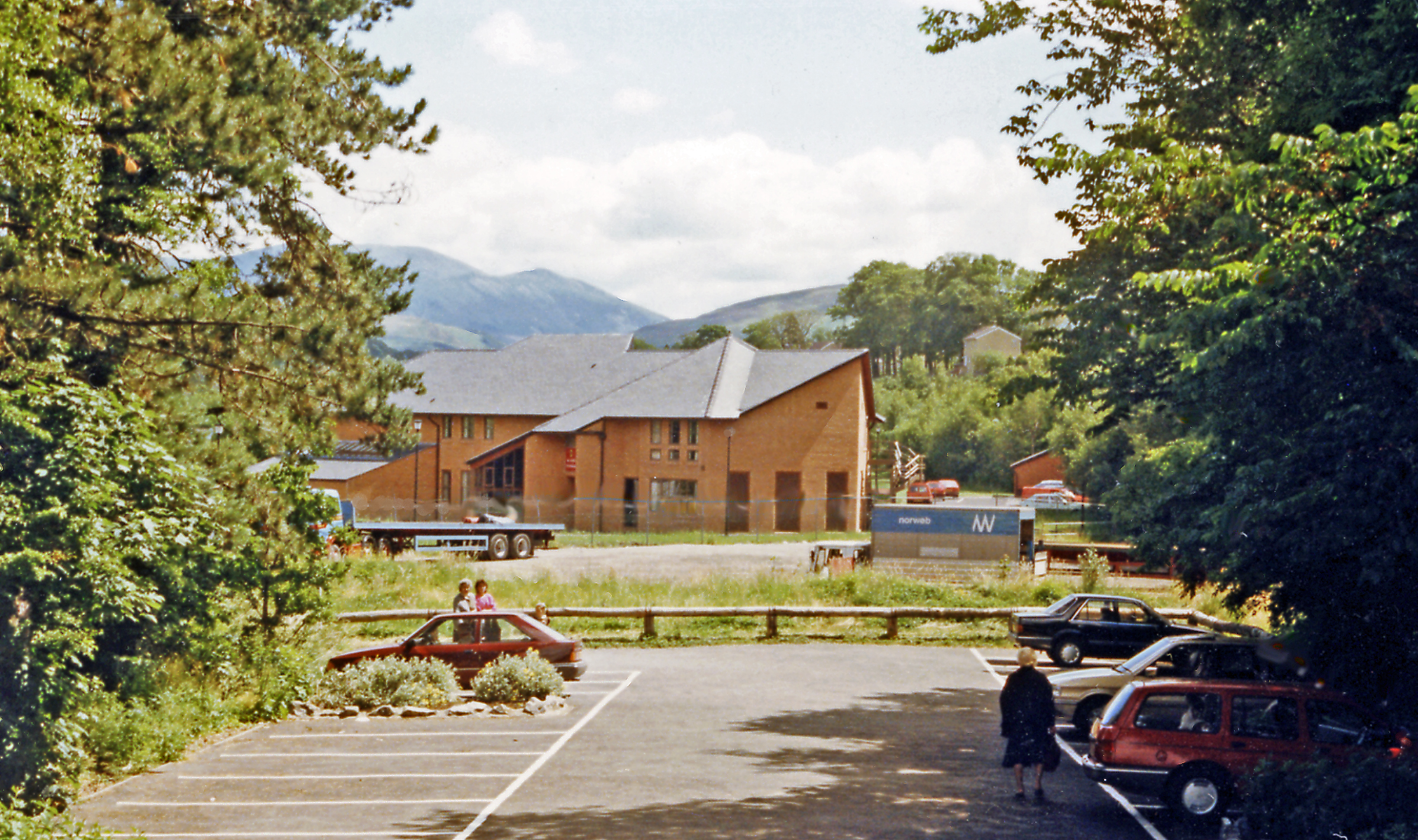
The site of the former Cockermouth station in 1986
