= Trout Beck (Glenderamackin) =

Stream in Cumbria, England

Coordinates: 54.6324°N 2.9960°W

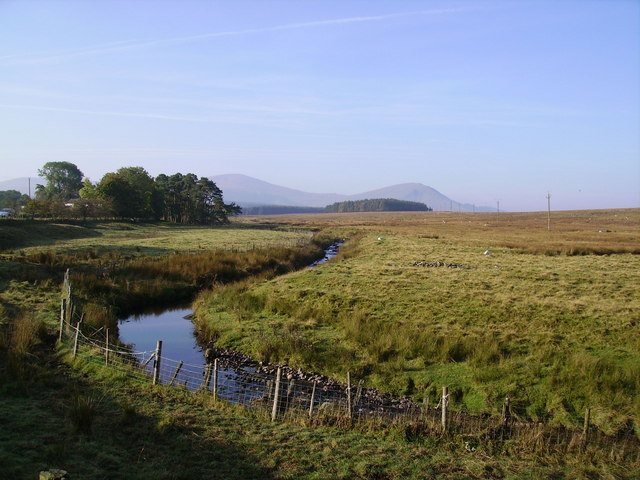
Trout Beck, looking towards Clough Head and Great Dodd

Trout Beck is a 7.6 miles (12.3 km) long stream or beck in the English Lake District, Cumbria. It rises on the northwestern slopes of Great Dodd, with tributaries including Groove Beck and Thornsgill Beck, and flows east then north to the hamlet of Troutbeck. It then flows west, parallel to and south of the A66 road, going just south of Hutton Moor End then under the old Hutton Moor Road at Wolt Bridge where it joins the River Glenderamackin.

To the west of Troutbeck hamlet the beck is bridged by the former Cockermouth, Keswick and Penrith Railway.
