= Troutbeck, Hutton =

Village in Cumbria, England, near Penrith

Coordinates: 54.6224°N 2.9533°W

Troutbeck
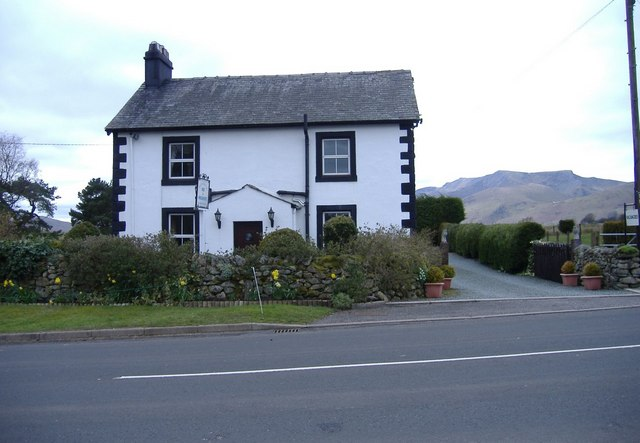
- Netherdene Guesthouse, Troutbeck

- Location in Eden, Cumbria Location within Cumbria
- OS grid reference: NY385265
- Civil parish: Hutton
- Unitary authority: Westmorland and Furness
- Ceremonial county: Cumbria
- Region: North West
- Country: England
- Sovereign state: United Kingdom
- Post town: PENRITH
- Postcode district: CA11
- Dialling code: 01768
- Police: Cumbria
- Fire: Cumbria
- Ambulance: North West
- UK Parliament: Westmorland and Lonsdale

Troutbeck is a hamlet within Cumbria, England, a few miles to the west of Penrith. It was previously in the county of Cumberland. It lies within the Lake District, the civil parish of Hutton, and the unitary authority of Westmorland and Furness.

Great Mell Fell is situated immediately to the east of Troutbeck. It is open-access land which belongs to the National Trust.

There are five Roman temporary or marching camps just to the north of Troutbeck, adjoining the A66 Roman road.

The place-name 'Troutbeck' is first attested in the Subsidy Rolls of 1332, where it appears as Troutbek. The name means 'trout stream'. The stream the Trout Beck heads towards it and then veers west where it joins the River Glenderamackin less than half a mile to the west of Hutton Moor End.

== Tourism ==
Located within Troutbeck is the Troutbeck Inn, Sportsman Inn, several Guest Houses/B&Bs, a camp, and a Caravan Club site.

== Transport ==
Situated approximately 10 miles west of Penrith and just south of the A66, Troutbeck can be reached by car.

Its railway station on the former Cockermouth, Keswick and Penrith Railway is now closed. The closest station is Penrith.
