= Hutton Moor End =

Hamlet in Cumbria, England

Coordinates: 54.635°N 2.985°W

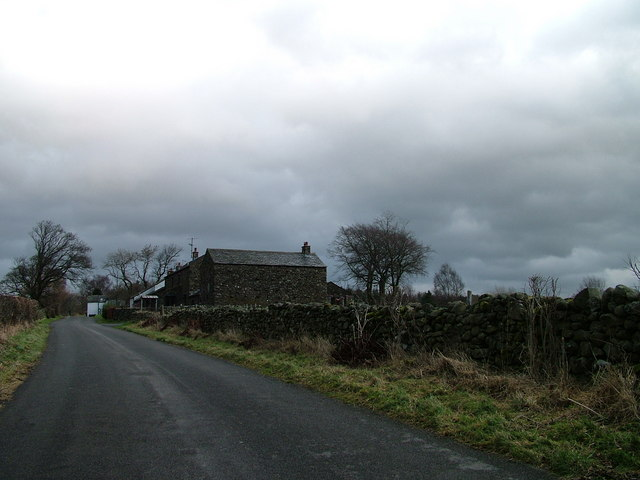

- Location in Eden, Cumbria Location within Cumbria
- OS grid reference: NY365271
- Civil parish: Mungrisdale
- Unitary authority: Westmorland and Furness
- Ceremonial county: Cumbria
- Region: North West
- Country: England
- Sovereign state: United Kingdom
- Post town: PENRITH
- Postcode district: CA11
- Dialling code: 01768
- Police: Cumbria
- Fire: Cumbria
- Ambulance: North West
- UK Parliament: Westmorland and Lonsdale

Hutton Moor End is a hamlet on the Hutton Moor Road in the north east of the Lake District in Cumbria, England. It lies within the civil parish of Mungrisdale and is known locally as 'Moor End' as it is at the end of the Hutton Moor on an old route-way between Penrith to Keswick.

== Hamlet and its listed buildings ==
Hutton Moor End is built around two listed buildings just 25 metres apart, (I) Low House and No.1 Low Moorend (1681) and its close neighbour (II) Moor End Farmhouse and Adjoining Barns (1719). Moor End Farmhouse was for many years a busy coaching inn named 'The Sun Inn', used regularly by stage coaches from Lowther Hall to Keswick. The mounting steps for the horses still remain as does a ring for tethering. An inscription high on an outside wall gives the building's age in Roman numerals. Low House's dated lintel is on its side-gabled stone porch cover's entrance.

== Placement on the old route-way ==
These two listed buildings were built upon an old route-way between Penrith and Keswick on a section known as the Hutton Moor Road. The two listed building's placement on this old-route way can clearly be seen on Thomas Donald's map of Cumberland, 1774 and Clarke's 1787 map as they are the only buildings of Moor End. Apart from a milestone, the Troutbeck Roman sites and a boundary stone they are the only listed buildings on the old road from the east of Threlkeld village to Stainton just outside of Penrith, a distance of 11 miles. The Hutton Moor Road was part of the A594 that was bypassed in the early 1970s by the A66, however the hamlet and a 1.5 mile stretch of the old road remained untouched. The Sea to Sea Cycle Route, which runs from the west coast of Cumbria to the north-east coast, now passes through the hamlet continuing the use of this old route-way.

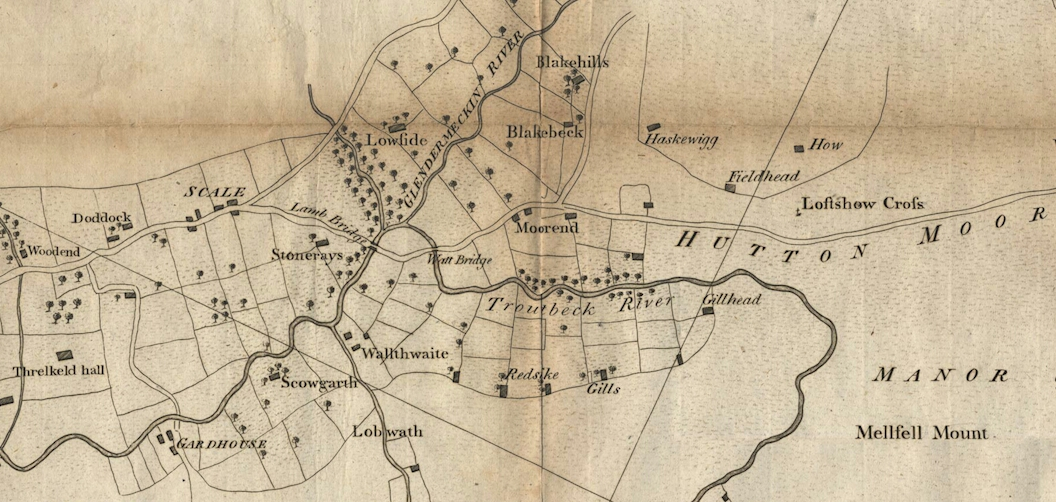

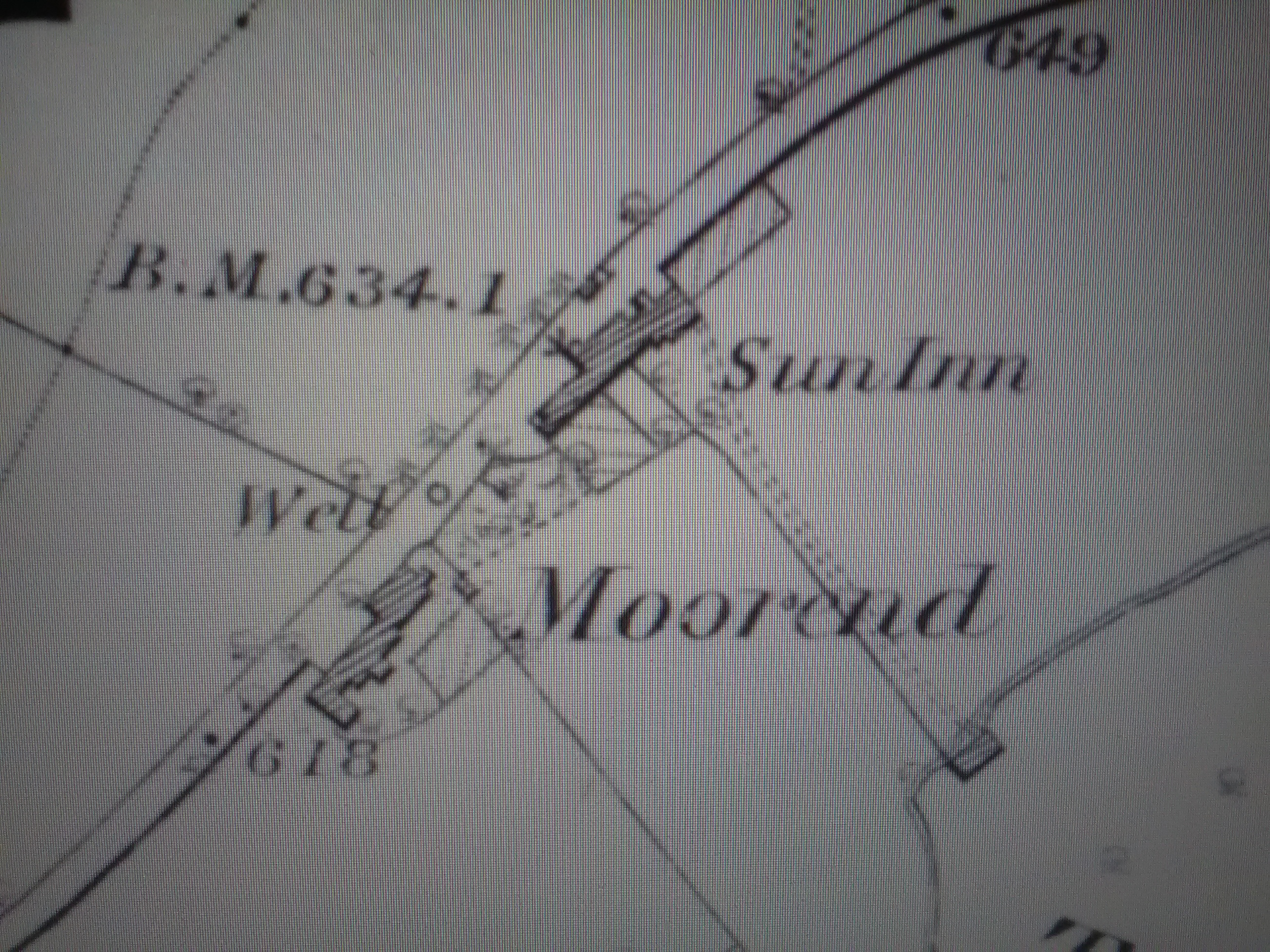

Hutton Moor End's listed buildings shown on old maps.

== Setting ==
Hutton Moor End is set in an open area with wide views towards the centre of the north Lakes. Looking north and west from Hutton Moor End are uninterrupted views of Sharp Edge on Blencathra, Souther Fell, the vale of Keswick and Castlerigg Stone Circle. There is a view in-between the Listed Buildings towards the south east of Great Mell Fell showing an ancient tumulus at its summit. Another old route-way, the Old Coach Road can be seen looking south running below Clough Head, Wolf Crags and along the base of Great Dodd. Although Moor End's setting is in a wide open area unusually no towns or villages can be seen from it only small settlements and farms are visible. To the north of the hamlet runs the river Glenderamackin and very near to the east of Hutton Moor End are the Troutbeck Roman temporary or marching camps proving the immediate area's importance as a transport corridor. This group of Roman sites played an important military role in the policing of the Lake District and its indigenous population and controlling access into the northern Lakes. Since the recent discovery of a Roman camp, said to be of national significance close to Castlerigg Stone Circle, historians now believe that it could prove right their previous predictions that the Roman road continued from Troutbeck to Keswick passing straight through the setting of Hutton Moor End.

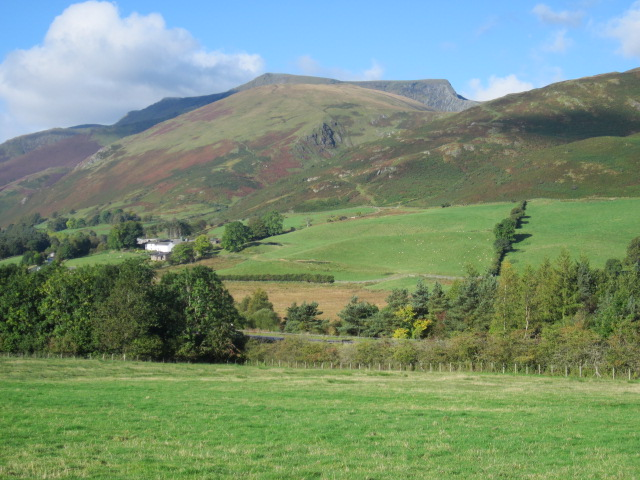
Sharp Edge, Blencathra from Hutton Moor End.

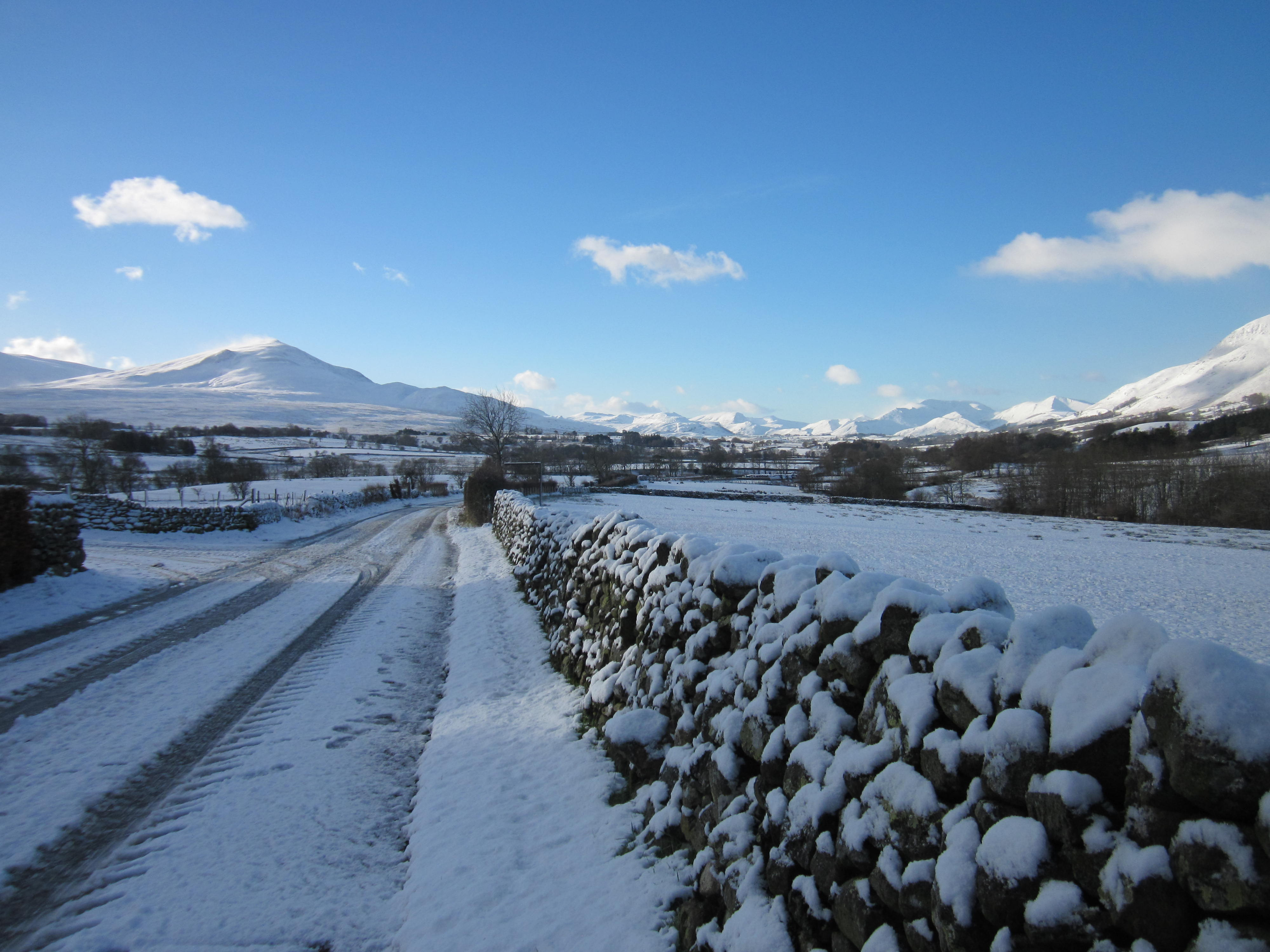
Looking west on the Hutton Moor Road at Hutton Moor End.

== Present day ==
To this day Hutton Moor End's roadside has never expanded and is still just the two listed buildings with their attachments. The hamlet has no public amenities, the nearest church being over 2 miles away at Mungrisdale and the nearest pub being the White Horse Inn at Scales more than a mile away. A caravan site's holiday usage is set off the hamlet's roadside towards the small Troutbeck river running to the east. The attachment to Low House is its old converted barn and attached to the old farmhouse is a cottage once used as a forge.

The Lake District National Park, which Hutton Moor End is a part of, became a UNESCO World Heritage Site under the Cultural landscape category in 2017.

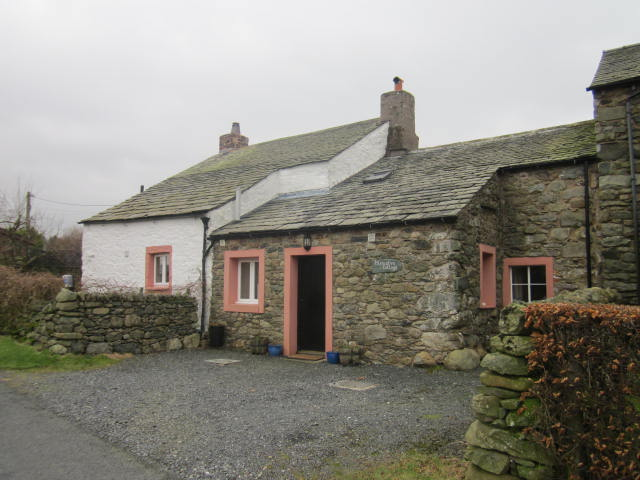
Low House & Number 1 Low Moorend

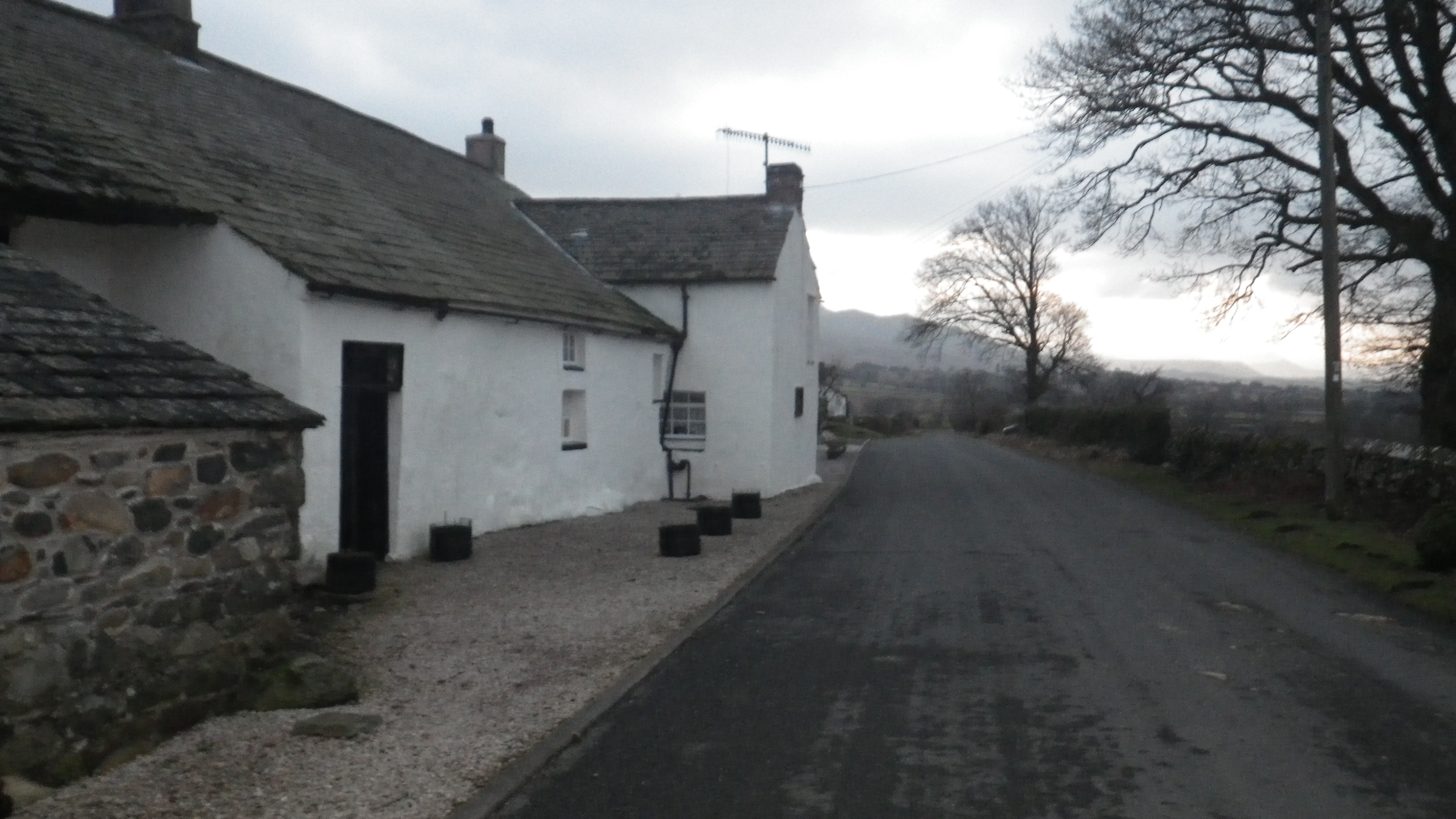
Moor End Farmhouse

== See also ==
- Listed buildings in Mungrisdale
