= Listed buildings in Threlkeld =

Threlkeld is a civil parish in Westmorland and Furness, Cumbria, England. It contains 14 listed buildings that are recorded in the National Heritage List for England. All the listed buildings are designated at Grade II, the lowest of the three grades, which is applied to "buildings of national importance and special interest". The parish is in the Lake District National Park, and contains the village of Threlkeld, but mainly consists of countryside, moorland and fells. The listed buildings include houses, farmhouses and farm buildings, a church, a bridge, and a public house.

== Buildings ==
Name and location	Photograph	Date	Notes
Building west of St Mary's Church; 54.61877°N 3.05256°W	—	16th century	This originated as a house, it is in stone with a Cumbrian slate roof, a single storey with a loft, and it is in two units. On the north side is a doorway with a massive lintel, a window to the left and a tall doorway to the right. Inside is a full cruck and a fireplace bressumer.
The Old Manse and former barn 54.61853°N 3.05151°W	—	1602 (probable)	Originally a vicarage with a barn added later, subsequently converted into a private house, it is roughcast with a green slate roof. The house has two storeys and three bays, and to the left is a two-bay former stable and a single-bay former barn. On the front is a porch, and the windows are sashes. The former barn has a projecting cart entrance.
Derwentfolds and barn 54.61918°N 3.08911°W		Mid-17th century	The farmhouse is in stone on projecting plinth stones, the barn is in mixed slate and cobble, and the roof is in green slate. There are two storeys, the right part has two bays, the left part is lower with three bays, and the lower barn is further to the left. The windows are sashes. At the rear is a stone porch with a side seat and a niche, and a semicircular stair projection.
St Mary's Church; 54.61877°N 3.05182°W		17th century	The oldest part of the church is the tower, the rest of the church was rebuilt in 1776–77, and it was restored in 1910. The church is rendered, and has a green slate roof with coped gables and a cross finial. It consists of a nave and a chancel with a south porch and a rectangular west tower. The porch has louvred doors with pilasters and an open pediment. On the sides are round-arched windows with keystones, and at the east end is a Venetian window.
Stoneraise; 54.63146°N 3.01109°W		Mid-17th century	A roughcast farmhouse with a green slate roof, two storeys and four bays, and with a former stable to the right. On the front is a two-storey gabled porch that has a round arch, a casement window above, and stone seats internally. The windows are sashes, those in the upper floor being horizontally-sliding, and inside the farmhouse is an inglenook.
Wesco Farmhouse and barns 54.61540°N 3.07860°W	—	Mid-17th century (probable)	The farmhouse and attached farm buildings are rendered, on projecting plinth stones, and they have green slate roofs. The house has two storeys, an eaves cornice, two storeys and three bays. The doorway has an alternate block surround, a keyed frieze and a pediment, and the windows are sashes in stone surrounds. To the right of the house is a single-bay stable, and to the left is a long barn containing a plank door, a cart entrance, and a loft door.
Low House; 54.61922°N 3.05029°W		Mid- or late 17th century	A roughcast house on large plinth stones with a green slate roof, two storeys and three bays. On the front are two plank doors, sash windows, and a bow window. To the left is a semicircular stair projection containing a small casement window, and to the right is a small lean-to extension.
Horse and Farrier Inn and adjoining house 54.61922°N 3.05093°W		1688	The public house and adjoining house are roughcast and stuccoed with a common green slate roof, and have two storeys. The public house has five bays, with a two-bay former stable to the right, and a two-bay house to the left. The doorway has a chamfered surround, an initialled and dated lintel, and a hood mould. The windows are sashes in stone surrounds.
Birkettfield and former stable 54.62064°N 3.01151°W	—	Late 17th or early 18th century	The farmhouse is roughcast, the former stable is built in mixed slate and cobble, and they have a green slate roof. The house has two storeys, three bays, a rear extension, and the single-bay stable is to the right, giving an L-shaped plan. There is a gabled porch, the house has sash windows in stone surrounds, and the stable has a plank door and casement windows with slate lintels.
The Riddings and barn 54.61526°N 3.06491°W	—	Mid- to late 18th century	A farmhouse and adjoining buildings incorporating parts of a 17th-century house. It is stuccoed on a chamfered plinth, with quoins, an eaves cornice, and a slate roof with coped gables. The house has two storeys and three bays, with wings linking a gabled barn to the left, and right-angled barns and stables to the right. The house has a Tuscan gabled porch and sash windows in architraves. In the barns are cart entries and plank doors.
Barn, Birkettfield; 54.62057°N 3.01110°W	—	Late 18th century	The barn is in mixed slate and cobble, and has a green slate roof and two storeys. It has a large cart entrance approached by a ramp, and ventilation slits. On the doors are carved initials and dates.
House west of Wesco Farmhouse; 54.61530°N 3.07940°W	—	Late 18th century	Originally a farmhouse and a barn, later converted into a private house, it is roughcast with an eaves cornice and a green slate roof. There are two storeys, the house has three bays, and the former barn to the right has two bays. The doorway in the house has an architrave and a pediment, and there is another doorway in the former barn. The windows are sashes in stone architraves.
Dobson's Bridge; 54.62912°N 3.00861°W		Late 18th or early 19th century	The bridge carries a road over River Glenderamackin. It is in stone, and consists of a single wide arch, with alternating thick and thin voussoirs. The parapet is pointed with rough coping, and the abutments are supported by four buttresses.
Barn, Stoneraise; 54.63125°N 3.01118°W	—	1866	The barn is in Skiddaw slate with sandstone quoins, a corrugated asbestos roof, and two storeys. The openings have sandstone surrounds, and there is a slated canopy with a loft door above.
