= Listed buildings in Mungrisdale =

Mungrisdale is a civil parish in Westmorland and Furness, Cumbria, England. It contains 47 listed buildings that are recorded in the National Heritage List for England. Of these, three are listed at Grade II*, the middle of the three grades, and the others are at Grade II, the lowest grade. The parish is in the Lake District National Park, and is sparsely populated, consisting mainly of countryside, moorland and fells. There are small settlements at Mungrisdale, Mosedale, Haltcliff Bridge, Southerfell, Berrier, Hutton Moor End, Hutton Roof, Low Mill, and Swineside. Most of the listed buildings are houses, farmhouses and farm buildings, the other listed buildings including a Friends' meeting house, bridges, a church, a former saw mill, a former school, eight boundary stones, and a telephone kiosk.

== Key ==
Grade	Criteria
II*	Particularly important buildings of more than special interest
II	Buildings of national importance and special interest

== Buildings ==
Name and location	Photograph	Date	Notes	Grade
Thwaite Hall; 54.70595°N 2.97219°W	—	1555	Originally a manor house, later divided into two houses, it is rendered with a massive chimney stack and a green slate roof. There are two storeys, four bays, and a projecting gabled bay at the right. On the front is a gabled porch and a Tudor-style doorway with a chamfered surround. There is one three-light mullioned window and a fire window, the other windows dating from the 19th century; above the windows are hood moulds. Inside the house is an inglenook.	II*
Low Mill Farmhouse and barn/byres 54.68303°N 2.98122°W	—	1611	The farmhouse and outbuildings are roughcast with a green slate roof. The house has two storeys and four bays, there is a single-bay byre to the left, a right-angled two-storey, single-bay extension to the rear, and a right-angled two-bay barn to rear, forming a U-shaped plan. The windows have chamfered surrounds, and the mullions have been removed. At the rear is a doorway with a chamfered surround, a Tudor arched head, an inscribed frieze, and a hood mould. Inside the house is an inglenook.	II*
Lowside; 54.63530°N 2.99931°W	—	Early 17th century	A farmhouse and adjoining barn in stone, on projecting plinth stones, and with a green slate roof. The house has two storeys, two bays, and a rear outshut. To the right is a long barn, the nearest two bays of which have been incorporated into the house. The doorway has a stone surround, the windows are mullioned, and there is a fire window with a chamfered surround. The door in the barn nearest to the house has a hood mould. In the barn is a plank door and ventilation slits, and at the rear is a cart entrance.	II
Barn, Croft House; 54.65737°N 2.93002°W	—	Early to mid-17th century	The barn is in stone with a green slate roof, and it has four bays. There is a porch, a small doorway and ventilation slits. Inside the barn are three full cruck trusses.	II
Askew Rigg; 54.64263°N 2.97574°W	—	1649	A farmhouse with a former house to the right and a barn to the left; they are roughcast with projecting plinth stones and have a green slate roof. There are two storeys, the farmhouse has two bays, and the former house has five. The windows are sashes, and the barn has a projecting cart entrance.	II
Croft House and barn 54.65746°N 2.93031°W	—	Mid-17th century	A farmhouse that was extended in the 19th century, it is roughcast on a plinth, and has a green slate roof. There are two storeys and three bays, with a lower barn to the left, and an extension to the rear forming an L-shaped plan. The windows in the original part are casements, and in the extension they are sashes. Inside the house is an inglenook and a bressumer.	II
Blake Hill Farmhouse and Cottage; 54.64405°N 2.98456°W	—	1662	The farmhouse was extended in the late 18th century, the extension forming the cottage. Both parts are in stone with green slate roofs, and have two storeys and sash windows, and both have gabled porches containing internal side seats. The farmhouse has three bays, and inside it is an inglenook and a bressumer. The cottage is roughcast, higher, and has two bays.	II
Croft House and barns 54.68083°N 2.99959°W	—	1666	The farmhouse is roughcast on large projecting plinth stones, the barns are in mixed limestone and cobble, and all have green slate roofs. The house has two storeys and three bays, and to the left is a lower barn with a right-angled extension, giving an L-shaped plan. The doorway has a chamfered surround and an inscribed and dated Tudor arch, and the windows are sashes in stone surrounds. In the barn are plank doors and a cart entrance.	II
Southerfell Farmhouse; 54.64203°N 2.99400°W		1666	The farmhouse was altered extensively in the 19th century. It is roughcast with a sandstone eaves cornice and a green slate roof. There are two storeys and three bays. The doorway and sash windows have stone surrounds.	II
Eycott Farmhouse; 54.65881°N 2.93343°W	—	1667	The farmhouse was altered in 1762, and extended to the rear in the 19th century. It is roughcast and has a green slate roof with coped gables. There are two storeys and three bays, a single bay extension to the right, and lower extensions to the left and to the rear, giving a T-shaped plan. The main doorway has a chamfered surround and a dated frieze and a cornice, and to the right is a Tudor arched doorway. There are 20th-century windows in 20th-century surrounds in the main part, in the left extension is a blocked window with a chamfered surround and a mullioned window above, and in the rear extension are sash windows.	II
Middle Farm Cottage; 54.68163°N 2.99873°W		1670	This was originally a part of Middle Farmhouse, and it was extended in 1695 with the addition of a wing at right angles facing the road. It is built in a mix of slate rubble and cobble, and has a green slate roof. There are two storeys, the original part has two bays, and the extension has three. In the original part there are mullioned windows, the end window having an architrave containing the date and an inscription. The later part has 20th-century windows in sandstone surrounds, a small fire window, and a segmental archway.	II
Crook-a-Fleet; 54.68873°N 2.98475°W		Late 17th century	A farmhouse and barns that were extended in the 19th century. They are in mixed limestone and cobble and have a green slate roof. The house has two storeys and three bays, a two-bay extension to the left and an L-shaped barn to the right. Some windows are sashes, some are horizontally-sliding sashes, and there is a casement window. In the barn are a plank door and a loft door.	II
Under Howe, barn and former stables 54.64690°N 2.97429°W	—	Late 17th century	A farmhouse, barn and stables, later a private house, it is in stone on projecting plinth stones, and has a green slate roof. The house has two storeys and two bays, the former single-bay stable has been incorporated into the house, and at right angles to the rear is the former barn, resulting in an L-shaped plan. The doorway has a stone surround and an initialled and dated lintel. The windows in the house are sashes. In the barn is a doorway a casement window, a loft door, and a garage door.	II
Low House and No. 1 Low Moorend; 54.63484°N 2.98586°W	—	1681	A pair of stone houses on large plinth stones and a green slate roof. There are two storeys, and each house has two bays. There is one mullioned window, the other windows dating from the 20th century. Above the doorway of Low House is a dated and initialled lintel.	II
Home Farm Cottage; 54.67605°N 2.99630°W		1693	A roughcast house with a green slate roof, two storeys and three bays. The doorway has a chamfered surround and a dated and inscribed lintel. The windows are sashes in stone surrounds, one of which has a mullion.	II
Former house and barn near Southerfell Cottage; 54.64231°N 2.99372°W		1695	The house is in mixed Skiddaw slate rubble and cobble, with an extension in mixed slate and sandstone, and it has a green slate roof. There are two storeys, the original part and the extension to the right both have three bays, and the barn is to the left. In the house are two doorways with alternate block surrounds, one with a dated lintel, and the windows are casements. In the barn are two round-headed entrances and a casement window.	II
Farmhouse, Haltcliff Bridge; 54.72024°N 2.98369°W	—	Late 17th or early 18th century	The farmhouse was extended in the 19th century. It is in mixed limestone and cobble, with a rendered front, and it has a green slate roof. There are two storeys and two bays, with a higher two-bay extension at the rear forming an L-shaped plan. The windows are sashes in stone surrounds. At the rear is a doorway with a chamfered surround, and an outshut.	II
Former farmhouse and barn, Roundhouse; 54.68183°N 3.02614°W	—	1702	The former farmhouse and barn are in mixed Skiddaw slate rubble and cobble, with a slate string course and a green slate roof. The house has two storeys and three bays with a lower barn to the left. They contain plank doors and mullioned windows.	II
Mosedale Quaker Meeting House and stables 54.68102°N 2.99891°W		1702	The building is in limestone and slate rubble, partly rendered, and has green slate roofs. The meeting house has a single storey, three bays and a single-bay extension added in the 1970s. To the right is an 18th-century extension at right angles, and to the left is a lower stable, resulting in an L-shaped plan. On the front facing the road is a door with a chamfered surround, and at the rear are mullioned windows.	II
Blakebeck and barns 54.64102°N 2.98279°W	—	1708	The farmhouse and barns are rendered with green slate roofs. The house has two storeys, four bays, and a doorway and sash windows with stone surrounds. It is flanked by barns; the barn to the left has an entrance with stone surround, a smaller opening and a loft door, and the barn to the right has a blank front wall.	II
Moor End Farmhouse and barns 54.63544°N 2.98497°W	—	1719	The farmhouse and barns are in stone with green slate roofs. The house is rendered, and has two storeys and three bays, a rear extension, a barn to the right, and a lower barn to the left, giving a T-shaped plan. On the front is a porch, mullioned windows, and one sash window, the windows having stone surrounds. The barns have plank doors at the rear, and behind the left barn is a mounting block.	II
Middles' Farmhouse and barn 54.68179°N 2.99873°W		1722	The farmhouse and the barn to the right, which is dated 1805, have a green slate roof. The farmhouse is roughcast with quoins to the right, two storeys and five bays. The doorway has a stone surround, an inscribed and dated frieze, and an open segmental pediment. The windows are cross-mullioned, with a round window above the door. The barn is in mixed slate and split cobble, and has quoins to the right. It contains a plank door and a loft door with alternate block surrounds, and in the end wall is a segmental-headed cart entrance with a dated keystone.	II
Churchstile; 54.71339°N 2.96493°W	—	Early 18th century	A farmhouse, later a private house, it is roughcast with a green slate roof. There are two storeys and two bays. On the front is a gabled porch with a side plank door, and the windows are mullioned.	II
Bishopspot; 54.71581°N 2.97180°W	—	1746	A farmhouse, later a private house, it is in stone and cobbles, and has a slate roof. There are two storeys and three bays, with a former two-bay barn to the right. The doorway has a chamfered surround and a shaped, dated and inscribed lintel. The windows are casements in chamfered surrounds, and there are two fire windows. In the former barn is an entrance with a chamfered surround and blocked ventilation slits. Inside the house is an inglenook and a bressumer.	II
Bridge over the Glendermackin; 54.64134°N 2.98627°W	—	18th century (probable)	The bridge carries a road over the River Glenderamackin. It is in Skiddaw slate, and consists of a single segmental arch. The bridge is single-tracked with a hump back, and has a solid parapet with central slate finials.	II
Chapel House and former barn 54.66537°N 2.98977°W	—	18th century (probable)	Originally a farmhouse and barn, later a private house, it was extended in 1814. The building is in stone with a green slate roofs. There are two storeys, the former farmhouse has three bays, and the former barn to the right is lower with two bays. Each part has a doorway with an alternate block surround, the former farmhouse also having a keyed frieze. The windows in the former farmhouse are sashes, and in the former barn are a loft door and, in the end wall, a mullioned opening.	II
Wham Head Farmhouse; 54.69921°N 2.97205°W	—	Mid-18th century	The farmhouse is rendered on a chamfered plinth, with sandstone dressings, quoins, an eaves cornice, and a green slate roof. There are two storeys and three bays. The doorway has an architrave, a frieze with a keystone, and a segmental pediment, and the windows are sashes in stone surrounds.	II
Copyhill and barns 54.66006°N 2.98339°W	—	1754	A farmhouse and barns in slate and cobbles on large projecting plinth stones, with a green slate roof, incorporating part of a 17th-century house. The farmhouse has two storeys and three bays, with a single-bay former house to the right, and a rear outshut. The doorway has an alternate-block sandstone surround, and the windows are mullioned in sandstone surrounds. The barn to the left has two doors with a common wooden lintel, and a loft door.	II
St Kentigern's Church; 54.66498°N 2.98801°W		1756	The church is built on a medieval site, and was restored in 1925. It is in stone with a slate roof, and consists of a nave and a chancel in a single cell, and a west porch. On the west gable is a roughcast bellcote. The windows are round-headed with keystones, and the east window has three lights. Inside the church are box pews and a three-decker pulpit.	II*
Gate Farm, Gate Cottage and former barn 54.66401°N 2.99036°W	—	Late 18th or early 19th century	Originally a farmhouse, later two dwellings, and an adjoining former barn, they are in mixed slate rubble and cobble with a green slate roof. There are two storeys and each house has two bays. Gate Farm has a plank door, Gate Cottage has a doorway partly with a sandstone alternate block surround, and the windows are sashes in sandstone surrounds.	II
Marks House and barn 54.70410°N 2.98562°W	—	Late 18th or early 19th century	The former farmhouse and barn are in mixed limestone and cobble, roughcast on the side and rear, and have a green slate roof. The house has two storeys and two bays, and the L-shaped barn is to the right. In the house is a doorway with an alternate block surround and a keyed entablature, and the windows are sashes in stone surrounds. The barn has a projecting cart entrance flanked by doors.	II
Southerfell Cottage; 54.64210°N 2.99393°W	—	Late 18th or early 19th century	A house in slate rubble with a limestone eaves cornice, quoins, and a green slate roof. There are two storeys and three bays. The doorway has a limestone surround, a panel frieze, and a dentilled pediment, and the windows are sashes in limestone surrounds.	II
Boundary stone 54.67157°N 2.98046°W	—	Early 19th century	This consists of a split green slate with a rounded top. It is inscribed "MUNGRISDALE".	II
Mosedale Bridge; 54.67886°N 2.99868°W		Early 19th century (probable)	The bridge carried a road over the River Caldew, and has now been bypassed. It is in Skiddaw slate with sandstone coping. The bridge consists of a single segmental arch with a hump back and a double-track width. There is a solid parapet with chamfered coping.	II
Saw Mill north of the Mill House; 54.72036°N 2.98471°W	—	Early 19th century (probable)	The sawmill, later used for other purposes, is in sandstone with a Welsh slate roof. It has a single storey and four bays, and contains a plank door in an alternate block surround, and casement windows in wooden surrounds. To the rear is a wheelhouse with a corrugated iron roof that contains an iron waterwheel.	II
Mosedale House; 54.68034°N 3.00025°W		Early 19th century	A house in slate and cobble rubble, with sandstone rusticated quoins and a green slate roof. There are two storeys and three bays. The doorway and sash windows have stone surrounds, and at the rear is a staircase window.	II
Former School; 54.66572°N 2.98900°W		1835	The school closed in 1960 and has since been used as a post office and a private house. It is rendered on a chamfered plinth, and has sandstone quoins and a hipped slate roof. There are 1½ storeys and two bays. On the front are two doors with alternate block surrounds and keyed friezes. In the centre is a large round-headed window, flanked by smaller sash windows in sandstone surrounds, and there are two large round-headed windows at the rear. Major renovation circa 2000.	II
School House; 54.66406°N 2.99094°W		1835 (probable)	The house is in mixed slate and cobble, with quoins and a slate roof. There are two storeys and two bays. The door has an alternate block surround and a keyed frieze, and the windows are sashes in sandstone surrounds.	II
Undercrag, barn and woodshed 54.66729°N 2.98823°W	—	1835	The farmhouse and outbuildings are in Skiddaw slate on a slate plinth, with quoins and green slate roofs. The house has two storeys and three bays, a lower single-bay woodshed to the left, and a lower long barn to the right. The doorway has an alternate block surround, and the windows are sashes in sandstone surrounds. In the woodshed is a door and a loft door, and the barn has a through archway, doors, loft doors, one with external steps, and ventilation slits.	II
Boundary stone 54.68395°N 2.98427°W		19th century (probable)	The boundary stone is in split slate with a roughly-shaped head. On it is a cast iron plate inscribed with "TOWNSHIP OF BERRIER V MURRAH".	II
Boundary stone 54.68413°N 2.98433°W		19th century (probable)	The boundary stone is in split slate with a roughly-shaped head. On it is a cast iron plate inscribed with "TOWNSHIP OF BERRIER V MURRAH".	II
Boundary stone 54.69133°N 2.98947°W		19th century (probable)	The boundary stone is in split slate with a roughly-shaped head. On it is a cast iron plate inscribed with "TOWNSHIP OF MOSEDALE".	II
Boundary stone 54.68348°N 2.98545°W	—	19th century (probable)	The boundary stone is in split slate with a roughly-shaped head. On it is a cast iron plate inscribed with "TOWNSHIP OF MOSEDALE".	II
Boundary stone 54.68354°N 2.98527°W	—	19th century (probable)	The boundary stone is in split slate with a roughly-shaped head. On it is a cast iron plate inscribed with "TOWNSHIP OF BERRIER V MURRAH".	II
Boundary stone 54.68032°N 2.97401°W	—	19th century (probable)	The boundary stone is in split slate with a roughly-shaped head. On it is a cast iron plate inscribed with "TOWNSHIP OF BERRIER V MURRAH".	II
Boundary stone 54.68034°N 2.97231°W	—	19th century (probable)	The boundary stone is in split slate with a roughly-shaped head. On it is a cast iron plate inscribed with "TOWNSHIP OF BERRIER V MURRAH".	II
Telephone kiosk 54.66387°N 2.99082°W		1935	A K6 type telephone kiosk, designed by Giles Gilbert Scott. Constructed in cast iron with a square plan and a dome, it has three unperforated crowns in the top panels.	II
