= St. John's Beck =

River in Cumbria, England

Coordinates: 54.6125°N 3.0627°W

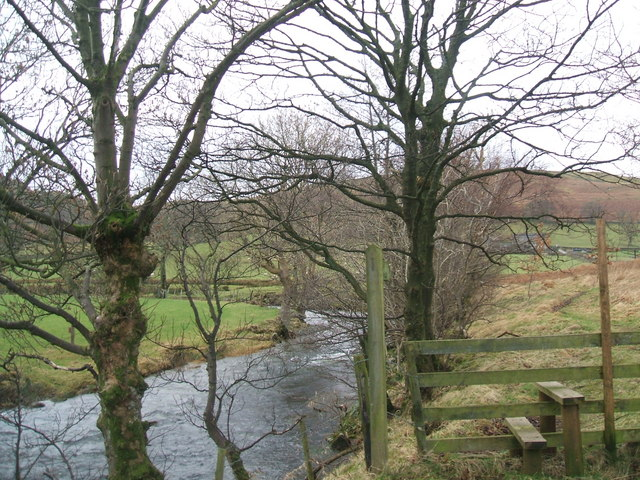
St John's Beck

St. John's Beck is a river in the Lake District of Cumbria, England.

The beck has its beginning as an outflow of Thirlmere, whence it flows northwards through St. John's in the Vale, towards Threlkeld, where it meets the River Glenderamackin to form the River Greta.
