= Beckces =

Hamlet in Cumbria, England

Coordinates: 54.641°N 2.904°W

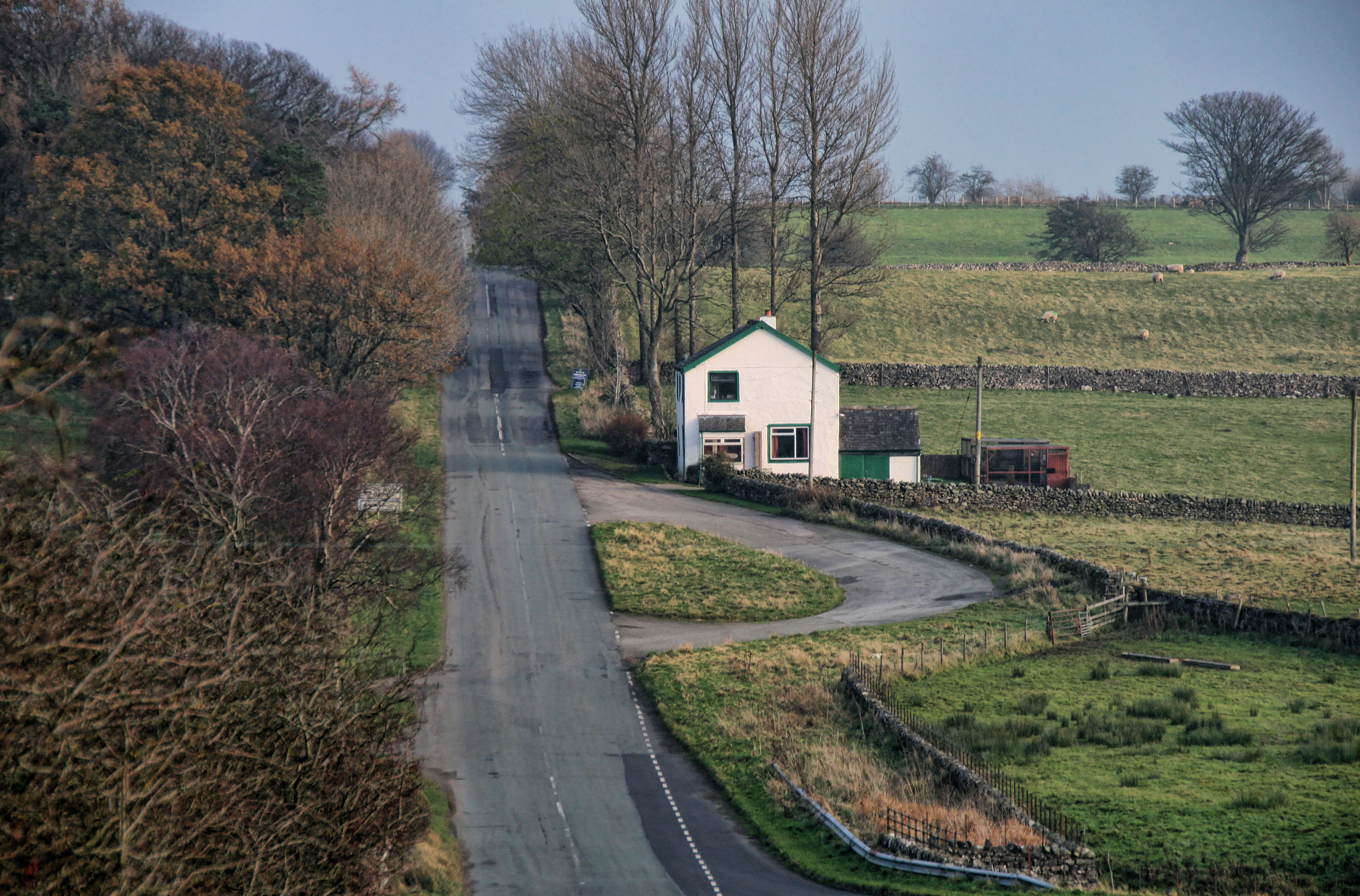
- Chapel House, Beckces

- Location in Eden, Cumbria Location within Cumbria
- OS grid reference: NY416277
- Civil parish: Hutton
- Unitary authority: Westmorland and Furness
- Ceremonial county: Cumbria
- Region: North West
- Country: England
- Sovereign state: United Kingdom
- Post town: PENRITH
- Postcode district: CA11
- Dialling code: 017684
- Police: Cumbria
- Fire: Cumbria
- Ambulance: North West
- UK Parliament: Westmorland and Lonsdale

Beckces is a hamlet approximately 800 yards (750 metres) west of Penruddock railway station on the former Cockermouth, Keswick & Penrith Railway within the Lake District National Park in Cumbria, England. The railway formed the northern boundary of the hamlet but its embankment to the east has been removed and the cutting to the west infilled. Beckces (the local spelling is now Beckses) is 7 miles west of Penrith and a little over 11 miles from Keswick and is served by the B5288 Greystoke road, which branches off the A66 trunk road between those towns. The hamlet includes a caravan park and holiday cottages for hire.

Beckces falls within the civil parish of Hutton.
