= Naddle Beck =

River in Cumbria, England

Coordinates: 54.6119°N 3.0800°W

Naddle Beck is a minor river of Cumbria, England.

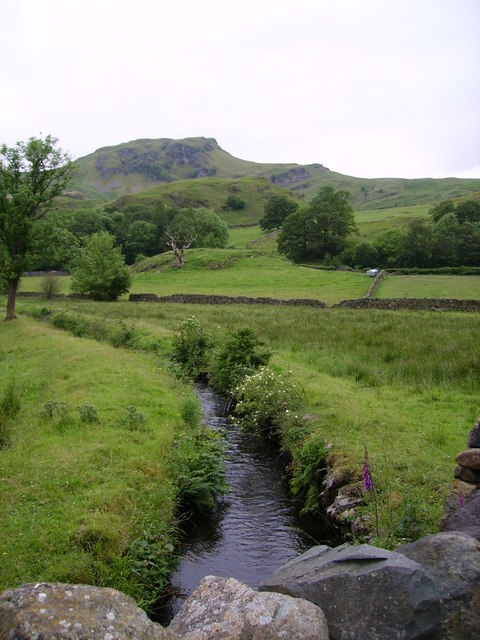
Naddle Beck with Dodd Crag in the background

Rising beneath Dodd Crag, Naddle Beck flows northward to meet the River Greta.

The major tributary of Naddle Beck is Shoulthwaite Gill, which drains the eastern side of High Seat and Bleaberry Fell. Mere Gill joins Shoulthwaite Gill beneath an old fort on Castle Crag. Other tributaries of Naddle Beck are Brown Beck and William's Beck.
