= Hutton, Cumbria =

Civil parish in Cumbria, England

Coordinates: 54.633°N 2.874°W

Hutton
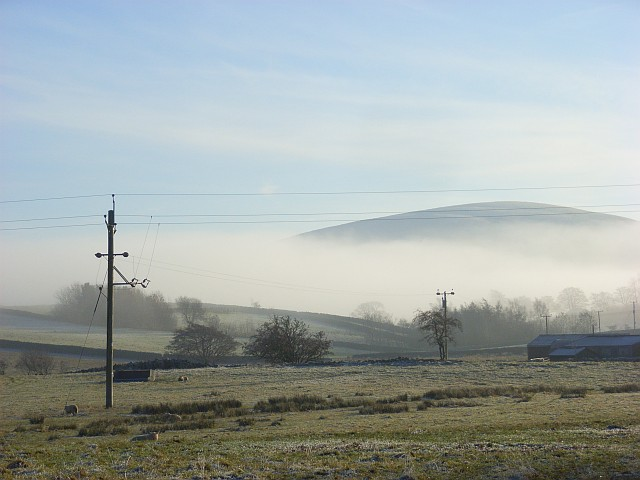
- Pasture at Swinescales

- Location in the former district of Eden, Cumbria Location within Cumbria
- Population: 326 (2001)
- OS grid reference: NY4326
- Civil parish: Hutton
- Unitary authority: Westmorland and Furness
- Ceremonial county: Cumbria
- Region: North West
- Country: England
- Sovereign state: United Kingdom
- Post town: PENRITH
- Postcode district: CA11
- Dialling code: 01768
- Police: Cumbria
- Fire: Cumbria
- Ambulance: North West
- UK Parliament: Westmorland and Lonsdale
- Website: huttonparishcouncil.org

Hutton is a small civil parish about 6 miles (9.7 km) west of Penrith in the English county of Cumbria. The parish contains the small mansion and former pele tower of Hutton John, the seat of the Hudleston family.

At the UK census 2011 the parish had a population of 438.

The parish of Hutton was created in 1934 from the merger of Hutton John and Hutton Soil parishes, both of which were formerly part of the original ecclesiastical and civil parish of Greystoke. The parish includes the village of Penruddock and the hamlets of Troutbeck, Beckces and Motherby. Whitbarrow holiday village is also within the parish. Administratively, Hutton forms part of Westmorland and Furness unitary authority. It has a parish council, the lowest tier of local government.

== Listed buildings ==
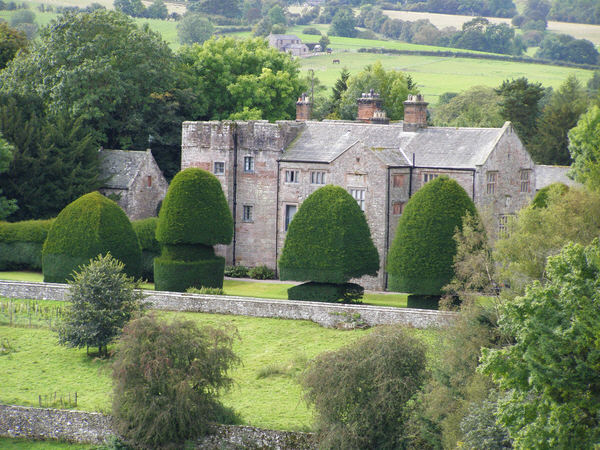
The Grade I listed Hutton John, a 17th-century house built around a 14th-century pele tower

There are 13 listed buildings in the parish. Hutton John, mentioned above, is Grade I and the remainder are Grade II.
