= Blencathra =

Mountains in the Lake District, England

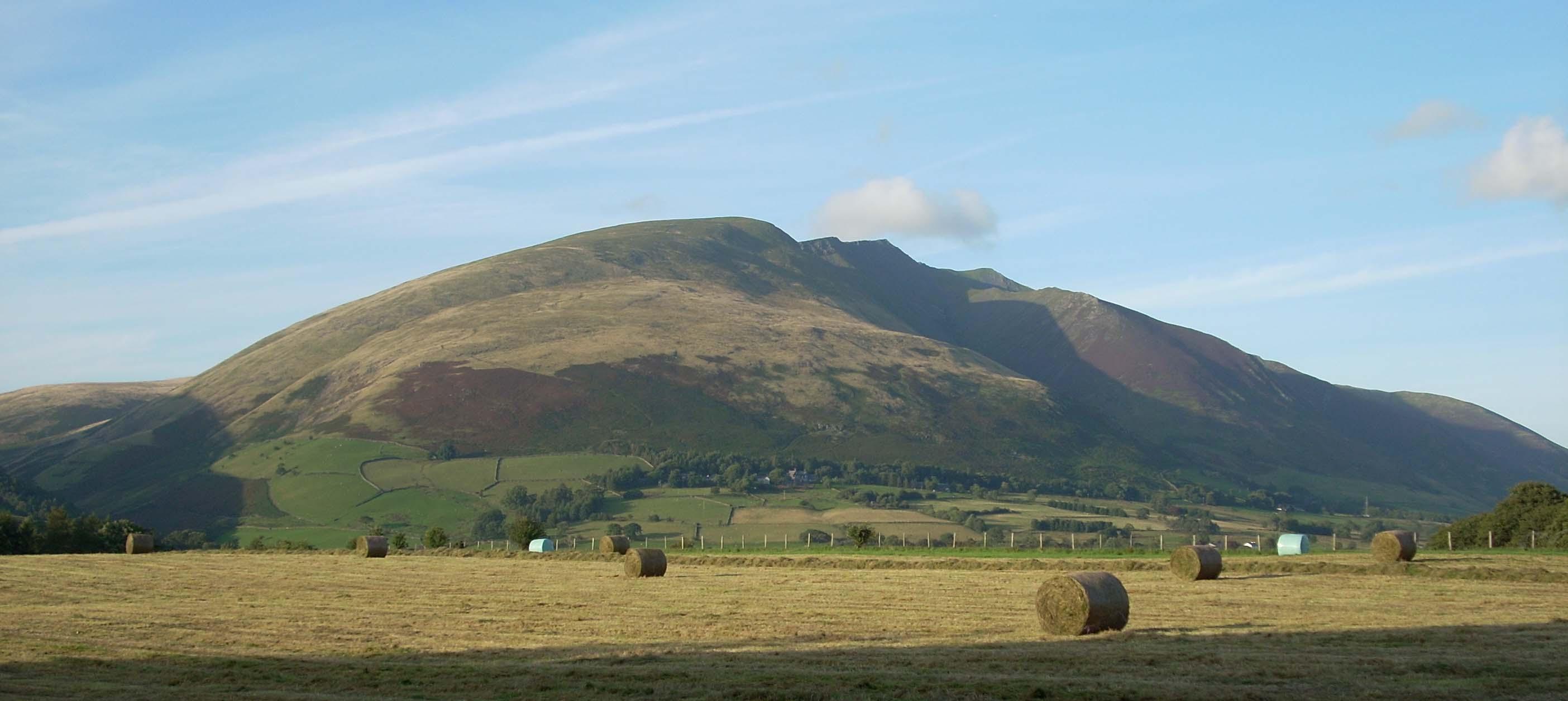
- Blencathra from Castlerigg stone circle

Highest point
- Elevation: 868 m (2,848 ft)
- Prominence: 461 m (1,512 ft)
- Parent peak: Skiddaw
- Listing: Hewitt, Marilyn, Nuttall, Wainwright
- Coordinates: 54°38′24″N 3°03′00″W

Geography
- Location within the Lake District
- Location: Cumbria, England
- Parent range: Cumbrian Mountains: Northern Fells
- OS grid: NY323277
- Topo map(s): OS Landranger 90, Explorer, OL4, OL5

Listed summits of Blencathra
| Name | Grid ref | Height | Status |
|---|---|---|---|
| Gategill Fell Top | NY317273 | 851 m | Nuttall |
| Atkinson Pike | NY324282 | 845 m | Nuttall |

Blencathra, also known as Saddleback, is one of the most northerly of the Cumbrian Mountains, in the English Lake District. It has six separate fell tops, of which the highest is the Hallsfell Top at 2,848 feet (868 metres).

== Name ==
For many years, Ordnance Survey listed Blencathra under the alternative name of 'Saddleback', which was coined in reference to the shape of the mountain when seen from the east. The guidebook author Alfred Wainwright popularised using the older Cumbric name, which is now used almost exclusively. Ordnance Survey currently marks the summit as ‘Saddleback or Blencathra’.

The name Blencathra is likely derived from the Cumbric elements *blain ‘top, summit’ and cadeir ‘seat, chair’, meaning ‘the summit of the seat’. Andrew Breeze has proposed an alternative interpretation of the second element of the name, arguing that it represents a Cumbric cognate of Middle Welsh carthwr ‘working horse’. Richard Coates has suggested that the second element may be the Middle Irish personal name Carthach, but writes that ‘the implications of that with a Brittonic generic need exploring’.

== Topography ==
The Northern Fells make up a roughly circular upland area about 10 miles (16 km) wide. At the centre is the marshy depression of Skiddaw Forest — a treeless plateau at an altitude of 1,300 ft (400 m) — and flowing outward from here are the rivers which divide the area into three sectors. Between the Glenderaterra Beck and the River Caldew, the southeastern sector contains Blencathra and its satellites.

Blencathra is more of a small range than a single fell, a series of tops standing out on a curving ridge three miles (five kilometres) long. It has smooth, easy slopes to the north and west, whilst displaying a complex system of rocky spurs and scree slopes to the south and east.

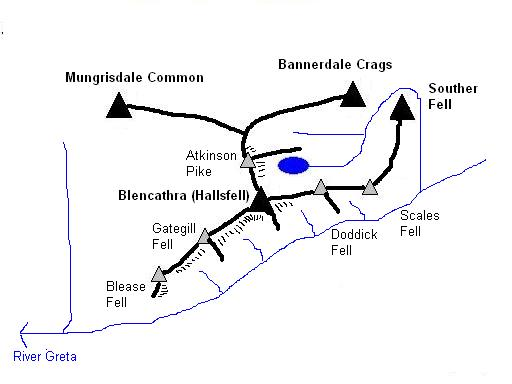
sketch map of Blencathra

When viewed from the southeast, particularly on the main Keswick to Penrith road, Blencathra appears almost symmetrical. To left and right, the ends of the fell rise from the surrounding lowlands in smooth and sweeping curves, clad in rough grass. Each rises gracefully to a ridge-top summit, Blease Fell on the west and Scales Fell to the east. Between these ‘book-ends’ are a further three tops, Gategill Fell, Hallsfell and Doddick Fell, giving a scalloped profile to the ridge.

From each of the three central tops, a spur runs out at right angles to the main ridge, beginning as a narrow, rocky arête and then widening into a broad buttress which falls 2,000 ft (600 m) to the base of the fell. Separating the five tops are four streams which run down the south-east face between the spurs. From the west these are Blease Gill, Gate Gill, Doddick Gill and Scaley Beck.

In addition to the spurs on the southeast face, Hallsfell also throws out a high ridge to the north. This is the saddle that gives Blencathra its alternative name, rising beyond the dip to the sixth top, Atkinson Pike. This is the focal point for connecting ridges to Bannerdale Crags and Mungrisdale Common to the north. The ‘saddle’ is bounded by crags to the east, Tarn Crag and Foule Crag being the principal faces.

== Sharp Edge ==
Between Tarn Crag and Foule Crag is Sharp Edge, an aptly named arête which provides one of the most famous scrambles in the area. Hiker and author Alfred Wainwright noted that: "The crest itself is sharp enough for shaving (the former name was razor edge) and can be traversed only à cheval at some risk of damage to tender parts."

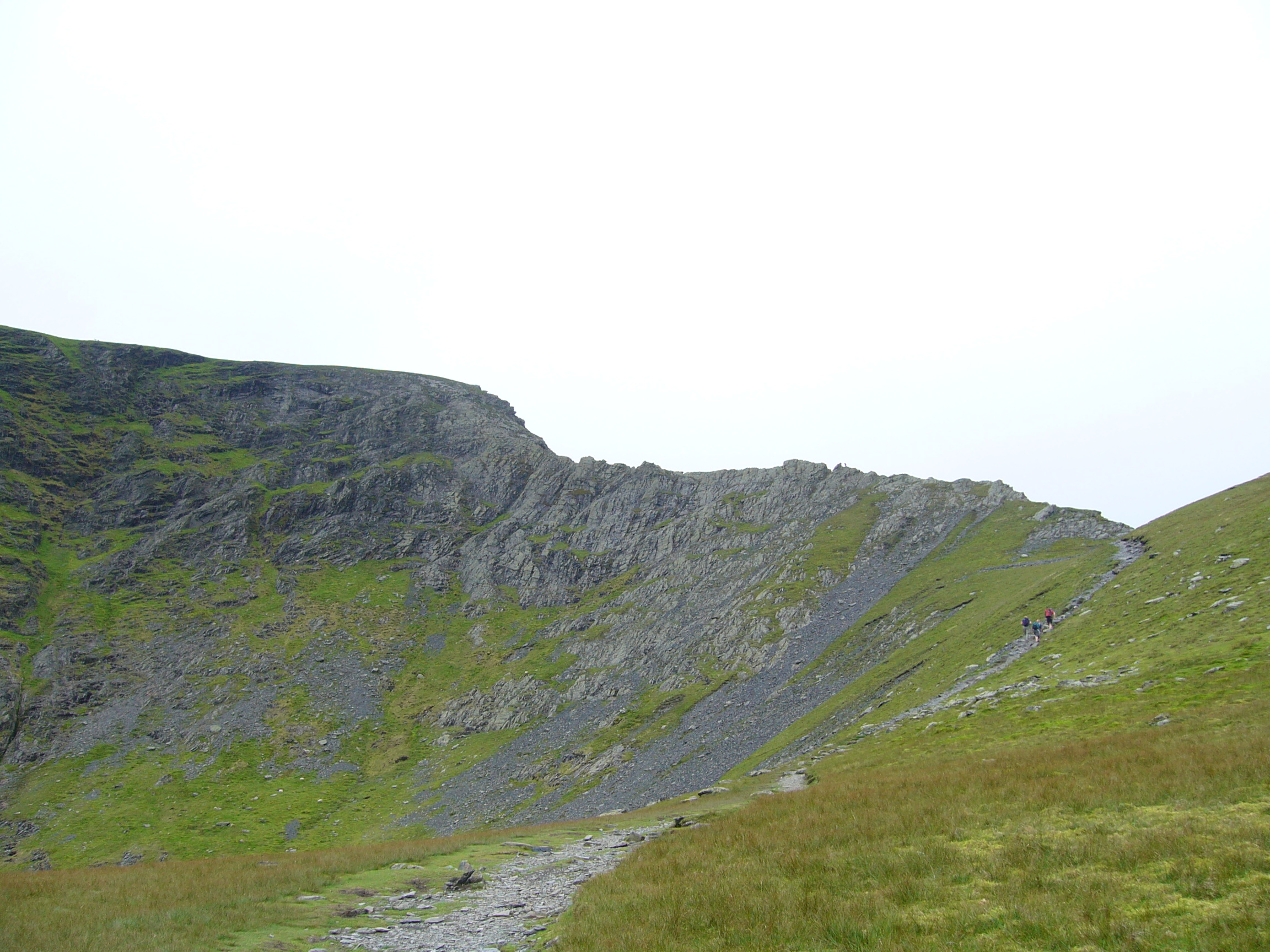
Sharp Edge

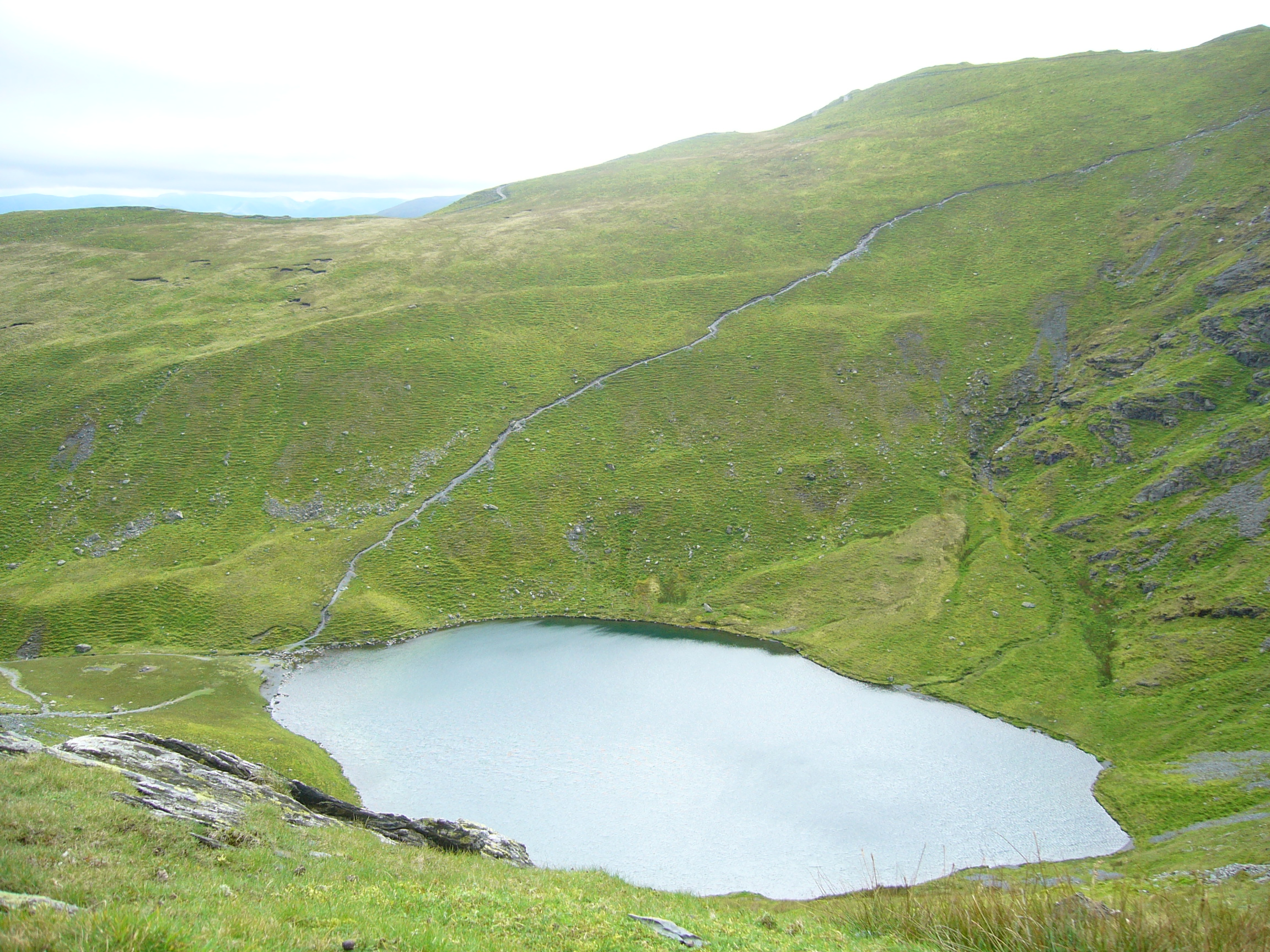
Scales Tarn, beneath Sharp Edge on Blencathra

Below Tarn Crags is Scales Tarn, an almost circular waterbody filling a corrie. The bed plunges steeply to about 25 ft (7.5 m) and plants and fish are scarce.

To the east, beyond Scales Fell, is the connection to Souther Fell at Mousthwaite Comb. This ridge continues north-east to the vicinity of Mungrisdale, surrounded on all sides by the River Glenderamackin.

== Geology ==
In common with much of the Northern Fells, the Kirk Stile Formation of the Skiddaw Group predominates. This is composed of laminated mudstone and siltstone with greywacke sandstone and is of Ordovician age.

There has been considerable mining activity beneath the slopes of Blencathra. Threlkeld mine lies at the base of Hallsfell. From 1879 to 1928, it was a profitable venture for the raising of lead and zinc ores and is believed to hold further reserves should the economic situation improve.

A small trial working can be seen beside Blease Gill near the 2,000 ft (610 m) contour. This is believed to have been driven for lead.

Saddleback Old Mine had workings near Scales Tarn and at Mousthwaite Comb. The mine was driven for lead but in the 1890s raised mostly limonite. This was marketed unsuccessfully as a pigment and the mine closed in 1894.

In the Glenderaterra valley to the west of Blease Fell were Brundholme and Blencathra mines. Lead, copper and baryte were raised between the middle of the 19th century and the final closure in 1920.

== Summit ==
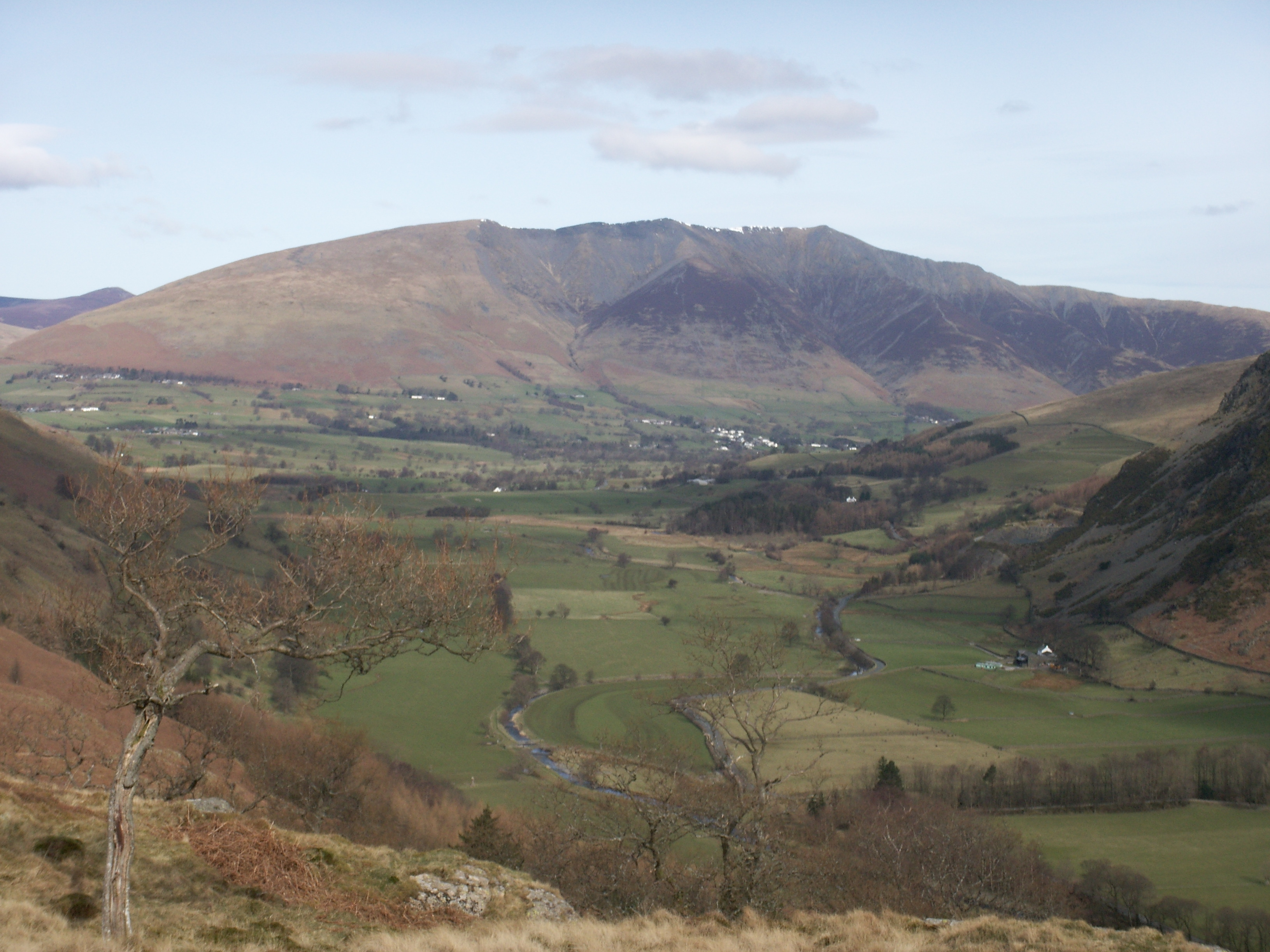
The south face of Blencathra, showing the symmetrical structure

The highest point is directly above the Hallsfell spur, marked by a trig point, in the form of a concrete ring. A good path connects the five summits on the main ridge, giving excellent views down the south-east face. Northward on the fine turf of the 'saddle' is a large cross laid out in white stones. Its origin is uncertain, but extension to its current size (in excess of 10 ft or 3 m) is attributed to a Harold Robinson of nearby Threlkeld, a frequent visitor in the years after the Second World War.

The view is very extensive, enhanced in every direction by the sharp fall of the slopes from the summit. To the west is the bulk of Skiddaw, and from west round to north-east the Back o’Skiddaw fells make up the foreground, backed by the mountains of Galloway, the Southern Uplands, the Border hills and the Cheviots.

The Pennines form the horizon from north-east to south-east, with Cross Fell, Mickle Fell, Wild Boar Fell and Great Whernside visible. To the south-east are the Far Eastern Fells and to the south the Helvellyn range is seen end-on, with vistas of the Forest of Bowland and North Wales to its left and right respectively.

The skyline from south to WSW is the best feature: a serrated skyline of all the major Lakeland peaks, these being, clockwise, Coniston Old Man, Crinkle Crags, Bowfell, Esk Pike, Scafell Pike, Great Gable, Kirk Fell, Pillar, High Stile, Grasmoor and Grisedale Pike. To the right of this, the Isle of Man and the Mourne Mountains are visible on clear days.

Derwent Water and Thirlmere are the major lakes visible; the most distant mountain visible is Slieve Meelmore in the Mourne Mountains in County Down, 123 miles (198 kilometres) away.

== Ascents ==
Blencathra is a popular mountain, and there are many different routes to the summit. One of the most famous is via Sharp Edge, a knife-edged arête on the eastern side of the mountain. Sharp Edge provides some good scrambling for those with a head for heights. Hall's Fell ridge, on Blencathra's southern flank, also provides an opportunity for some scrambling, though of a less serious nature. Alfred Wainwright described the ascent from Threlkeld via Hall's Fell ridge as ‘positively the finest way to any mountain-top in the district’.

Wainwright recorded more routes of ascent for Blencathra than any other fell. Blease Fell and Scales Fell provided easy walking on grass and fast routes of descent. Gategill Fell he noted as dull until the final arête is reached, while Hallsfell and Doddick Fell both received praise. Of the intervening gills, Scaley Beck was reckoned the most practicable, the other three being overly rough and devoid of interest. An ascent from ‘behind’, beginning from Mungrisdale, was also described.

== Ownership ==
In May 2014, its owner, Hugh Lowther, 8th Earl of Lonsdale, listed the entire mountain massif plus the Lordship of the Manor of Threlkeld for sale, at a guide price of £1.75 million. The sale was started in order to pay inheritance tax. A number of offers were soon made for the mountain, and the agent handling the sale suggested that the initial guide price could well be exceeded.

A community group, Friends of Blencathra, was set up in response to the announcement of the fell being listed for sale, and began fund-raising in order to make a bid. Mountaineer Sir Chris Bonington, broadcaster Melvyn Bragg and adventurer and television presenter Ben Fogle were among those to voice support for the group's bid. The National Trust (which owns 21% of the Lake District National Park) also backed the Friends of Blencathra, stating that it would not be placing a bid itself.

Eden District Council listed Blencathra as an asset of community value on 7 July 2014, following a nomination by Friends of Blencathra. This was the first time the 'community asset' status had been given to a mountain, and gave the community group more time to secure funding and negotiate with the owner.

In November 2015, the community group claimed to be making progress with the sale. Days later, H and H Land & Property, the estate agents handling the sale of Blencathra, announced the mountain was no longer on the market, claiming it would not be available to purchase for an 'indefinite' period of time. On 15 February 2016, Companies House published files confirming Friends of Blencathra had only raised £246,650 of the asking price in its first year of campaigning.

Due to a lack of "serious" offers, Blencathra was withdrawn from sale in May 2016, as the Earl had found other means of paying the tax. Following this, the Friends of Blencathra were given an ultimatum to make a final serious offer following concerns from donors that they would not see any result from the charity, and decided to end their campaign. Residual money from the fund disclaimed by contributors, totally around £100,000, was later donated to five selected local charities. The Friends of Blencathra was wound up in 2019.

== Other ==
Blencathra Field Studies Centre is an outdoor and environmental education centre at an altitude of 300 metres (980 ft) on the south-western side of Blencathra, at the foot of the ascent path to Blease Fell. It was built in 1904 and initially operated as a sanatorium. It now provides accommodation and learning opportunities for schools and universities, as well as specialist natural science training courses to adults. Since 2012 it has operated mostly off-grid, generating its own hydroelectricity and biomass heating.

In 2017, the Mountain Heritage Trust relocated its headquarters, and collections of objects and archives relating to British mountaineering, to the Blencathra Field Centre.
