= Haltcliff Bridge =

Hamlet in Cumbria, England

Coordinates: 54.720°N 2.984°W

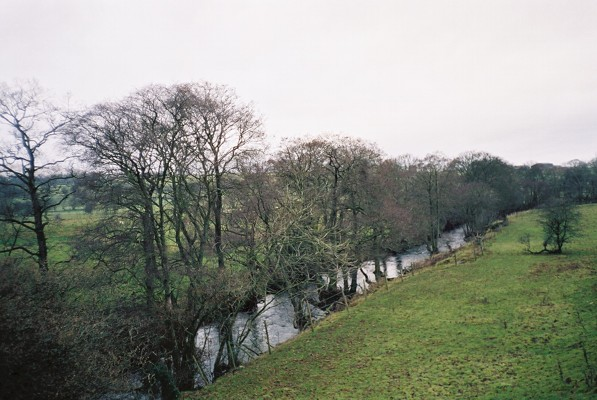
- River Caldew, north of Haltcliff Bridge

- Location within Cumbria
- OS grid reference: NY366365
- Civil parish: Mungrisdale
- Unitary authority: Westmorland and Furness
- Ceremonial county: Cumbria
- Region: North West
- Country: England
- Sovereign state: United Kingdom
- Post town: WIGTON
- Postcode district: CA7
- Dialling code: 016974
- Police: Cumbria
- Fire: Cumbria
- Ambulance: North West
- UK Parliament: Westmorland and Lonsdale

Haltcliff Bridge or Haltcliffe Bridge is a hamlet on the River Caldew, in the civil parish of Mungrisdale in the county of Cumbria, England. The spelling Haltcliffe is used by Mungrisdale parish council, by Royal Mail (e.g. for "The Mill" at CA7 8HX) and by English Heritage in their listing of Haltcliffe Hall, while Haltcliff appears on the Ordnance Survey map and in the 1870-1892 Imperial Gazetteer of England and Wales.

In the 2011 United Kingdom census the parish of Mungrisdale, comprising eight hamlets including Haltcliffe Bridge, had a population of 297.

== See also ==
- Listed buildings in Mungrisdale
