= Thomas Octavius Callender =

Scottish electrical engineer (1855–1938)

- Sir Thomas Callender
- Born: 9 April 1855; Clydeview, Partick, Scotland
- Died: 2 December 1938 (aged 83)
- Occupations: Engineer and businessman

Sir Thomas Octavius Callender (9 April 1855 – 2 December 1938) was an engineer and businessman, who promoted the electrical industry.

== Life ==
Thomas Callender born at Clydeview, Partick, Scotland, the eldest of the ten children of William Ormiston Callender of Bournemouth (1827–1908), a commission merchant, and his wife, Jean, née Marshall, the daughter of a Greenock tanner. He went to school at Greenock, in London and later at Boulogne-sur-Mer. During the Franco-Prussian War, he had to leave France and later he joined his father's company in London, where he focussed on the asphalt, paving and bitumen refining business, which his father had set up. Thomas Callender and his brother founded, in 1877, together with their father, who had acquired an interest in part in the import of bitumen from Pitch Lake, Trinidad for road-making and other waterproofing purposes. The offices were located at 150 Leadenhall Street, London, with a small refinery at Millwall, where the bitumen was landed. Large amounts of bitumen were refined and used for road-making and building purposes. Callender ensured that all impurities be removed at source, to reduce transporting costs. The company obtained many overseas road-making contracts.

On a visit to St Petersburg in 1880, Callender was impressed by opera house being lit by Yablochkov candles. To exploit the developing market for electric lighting, Callender decided to change the business towards the production of high-current insulated cables.

1881 tests on the production of insulated wire with patented vulcanized bitumen began at their new factory at Erith, Kent. 1882 Callender's Bitumen Telegraph and Waterproof Company was formed to finance the development of vulcanized bitumen. In the early 1880s, Callender invented the Callender solid system, where cables were laid in wooden troughs and embedded in bitumen.

Callender was responsible for the management of the Erith works. These supplied cables for the electric lighting of the new law courts in the Strand of London and for the Covent Garden Opera House in 1883, as well as mains cables for the growing number of electricity supply companies.

In 1891, the company introduced an underground electric haulage system at the Abercanaid colliery, Merthyr Tydfil, and, in the same year, it obtained its first tramways order, which was soon followed by the first electrified underground railway.

In 1896, he set-up his own company, Callender's Cable & Construction Company Limited, which became later British Insulated Callender's Cables (BICC). Callender's, for example, constructed the 132 kV crossing of the Thames at Dagenham with overhead cables spanning 3,060 ft (930 m) between two 487 ft (148 m) towers allowing 250 ft (76 m) clearance for shipping. With Callender as managing director, a position he kept until his death, the company was well placed to exploit the quick expansion in the application of electricity.

From 1904, significant cabling projects were conducted in India, for electricity supply and tramways. India was one of Callenders' most important markets; Callender stayed in close contact with important operations wherever possible; thus he proposed setting up permanent offices in India. Around 1902, the company provided the electrification of the metropolitan tramways in London, a seven-year contract, which was completed in 1909.

In 1913, the General Post Office began to order large amounts of telephone cables. In 1918, Thomas Callender was knighted. When the Vickers group was reorganised in 1929, Callendar obtained their shares in W. T. Glover and Co. Some shares later went to W. T. Henleys Telegraph Works Co and British Insulated Cables.

In 1930, he began discussions with the directors of British Insulated Cables on prospects for closer co-operation between the two companies, which eventually merged in 1945. He was a member of the Institution of Electrical Engineers and a director of several power companies. He died at Bidborough Court near Tunbridge Wells, Kent, aged 83.

== Honors ==
The steam locomotive Sir Tom of BICC in Kent, which is now at the Threlkeld Quarry and Mining Museum, is named after him.
