= River Greta, Cumbria =

River in Cumbria, England

River Greta
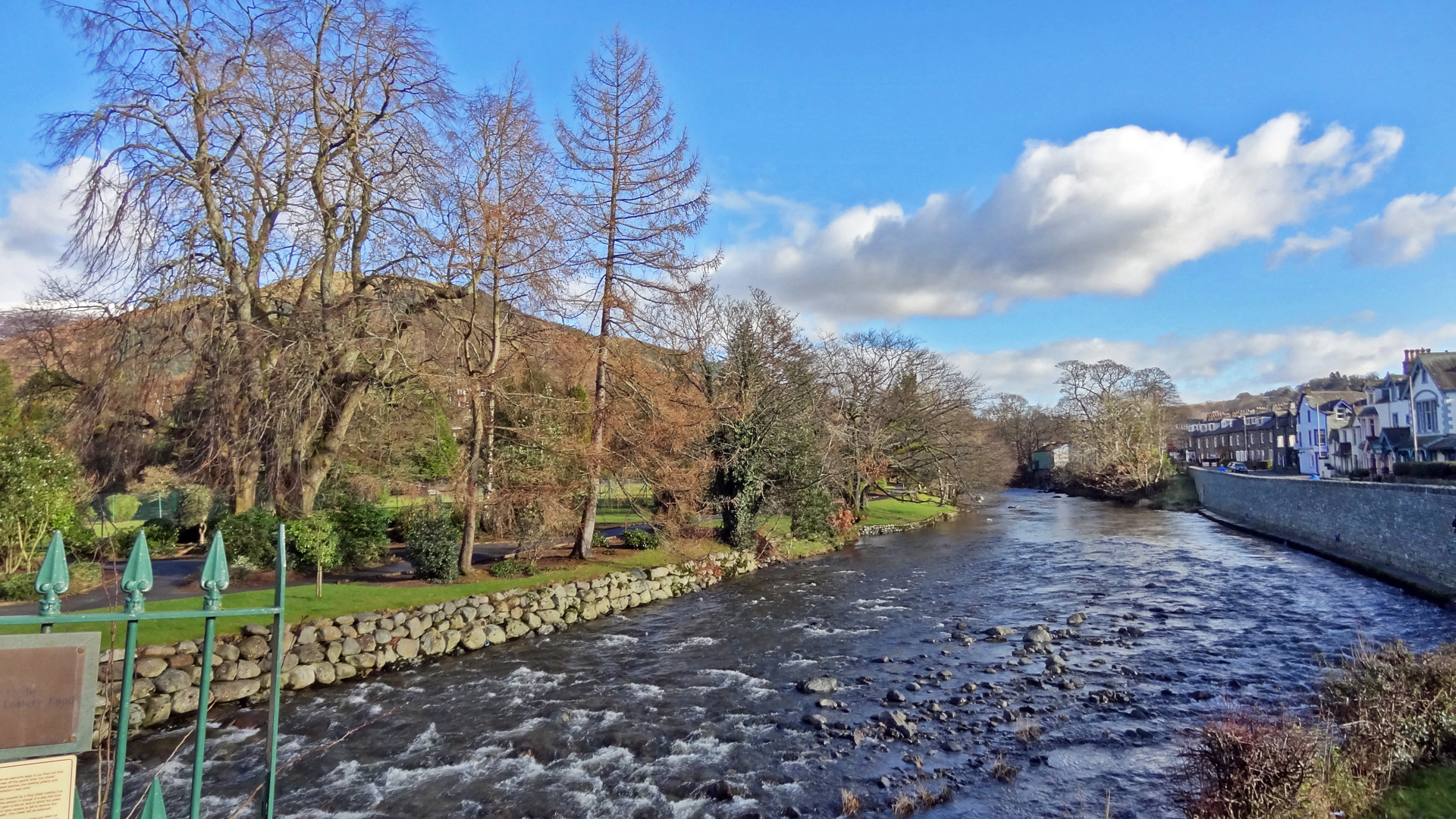
- River Greta in Fitz Park, Keswick

- Location of the mouth within Cumbria

Location
- Country: England
- County: Cumbria

Physical characteristics
- Source
  - location: Threlkeld
- Mouth: River Derwent, Cumbria
  - location: Keswick
  - coordinates: 54°36′7″N 3°9′10″W

The River Greta is a river in Cumbria, England. It is a tributary of the River Derwent and flows through the town of Keswick. "Greta" derives from the Old Norse "Griótá", meaning "stony stream". The name is in records dating from the early 13th century, and also appears in Latinised form, as "Gretagila", at the time of Magna Carta.

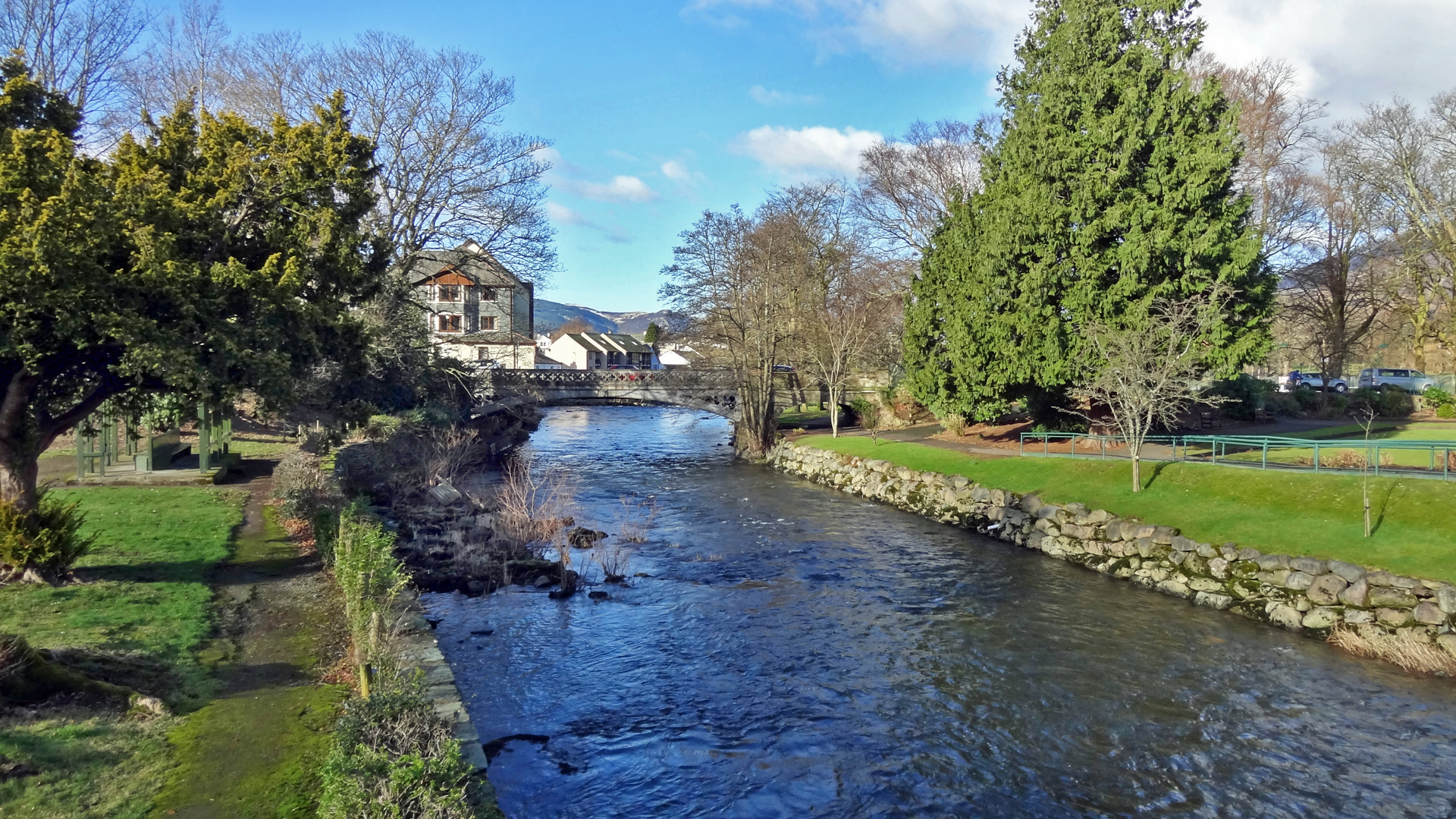
River Greta in Fitz Park, looking towards the town

The source of the river is near Threlkeld, at the confluence of the River Glenderamackin and St. John's Beck. From there, the river runs westward, roughly aligned with the former Cockermouth, Keswick and Penrith Railway between Keswick and Penrith. The river subsequently flows through Keswick before joining the Derwent just after the latter flows out of Derwentwater. The medieval bridge over the river in Keswick was unusual in having two arches; on the great coach road from Kendal to Cockermouth all but two of the other bridges (Troutbeck and Portinscale) crossed their rivers in a single span. The current Greta Bridge in Keswick is another two-arch structure, built in 1926.

The major tributaries of the Greta are Naddle Beck and Glenderaterra Beck.

== Literary associations ==
- Wordsworth’s sonnet ‘To the River Greta, near Keswick’, was written in 1823.
- Coleridge, referring to the sound of the boulders in the (19th C) stream, claimed that its name “literally rendered in modern English is ‘The Loud Lamenter’ - to Griet in the Cumbrian Dialect signifying to roar aloud for grief or pain –: and it does ‘’roar’’ with a vengeance!”.

== See also ==
- Castlerigg Stone Circle
