= Hutton Roof, Mungrisdale =

Hamlet in Cumbria, England

Coordinates: 54.69839°N 2.97358°W

Hutton Roof
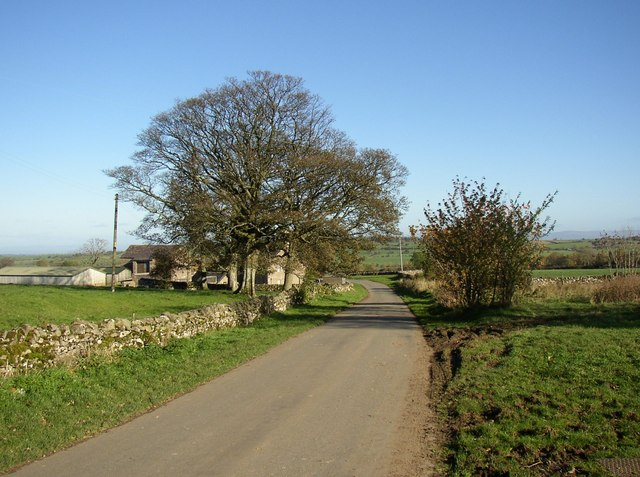
- The lane through Hutton Roof

- Location within Cumbria
- Civil parish: Mungrisdale
- Unitary authority: Westmorland and Furness
- Ceremonial county: Cumbria
- Region: North West
- Country: England
- Sovereign state: United Kingdom

Hutton Roof is a hamlet and former civil parish, now in the parish of Mungrisdale, in the Westmorland and Furness district, in the ceremonial county of Cumbria, England, near Penrith. It is at an elevation of 308 metres (1,010 ft), between the valley of the River Caldew and that of its tributary Gillcambon Beck. In 1931 the parish had a population of 108. The civil parish of Mungrisdale, which is made up of eight hamlets including Hutton Roof, had a population of 297 in the 2011 United Kingdom census.

== History ==
In 1870–1872 it was described as a township in Greystoke parish, with a population of 169 people in 33 houses. From 1866 Hutton Roof was a separate civil parish until 1 April 1934 when the parish was abolished and merged with Mungrisdale.

== See also ==
- Listed buildings in Mungrisdale
