= Threlkeld Quarry and Mining Museum =

Museum in the Lake District, England

Coordinates: 54.6130789°N 3.0470752°W

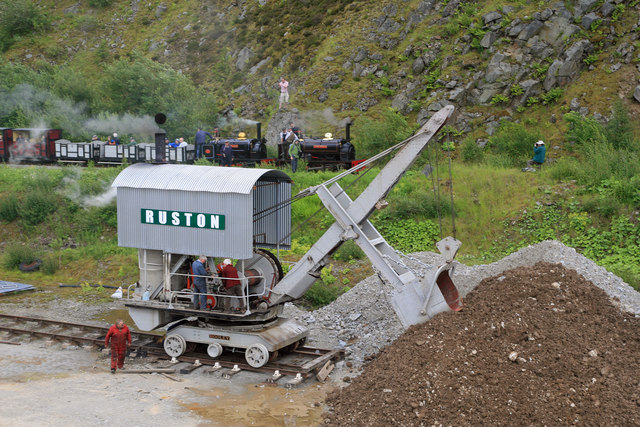
Ruston steam shovel and narrow gauge train at the Threlkeld Quarry and Mining Museum

The Threlkeld Quarry and Mining Museum is a museum located in Threlkeld three miles (4.8 km) east of Keswick, in the Lake District in Cumbria.

It includes a quarry with a collection of antique machinery, such as locomotives and cranes, an underground tour of a simulated mine, a geological and mining museum, and mineral panning.

== Quarry ==
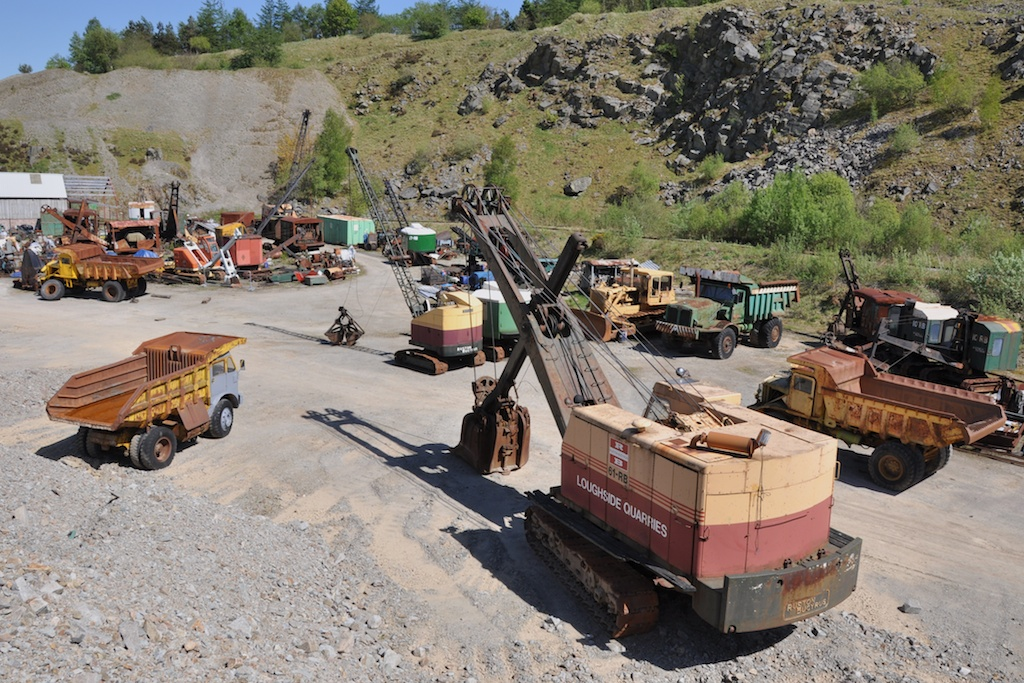
Outdoor display

Threlkeld Quarry originally opened in 1870 to supply railway ballast to the Penrith-Keswick line. Later, the stone was used by the Manchester Corporation Waterworks for their Thirlmere scheme, for railway ballast for the Crewe-Carlisle line, for roadstone, kerbing, and for facing buildings with dressed stone. The granite quarry finally closed in 1982 and is now the site for the Threlkeld Quarry & Mining Museum which is operated by staff and volunteers.

== Railway ==
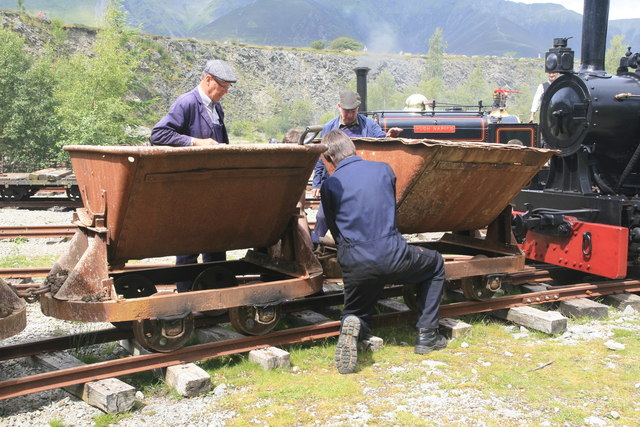
Narrow gauge tipper trucks

=== Sir Tom ===
The steam locomotive 'Sir Tom' was built by W.G. Bagnall of Stafford in 1926 and named after Sir Tom Callender of British Insulated Callender's Cables (BICC). This 0-4-0 saddle tank narrow gauge locomotive worked at BICC in Kent until 1968. After being idle for thirty-three years, it arrived at Threlkeld in 2001, and since then has been overhauled. Sir Tom was rebuilt and is driven by Ian Hartland. The locomotive completed the first full season of work at Threlkeld Quarry and Mining Museum in 2010. Sir Tom is mainly used to haul passenger trains from the middle quarry into the inner quarry.

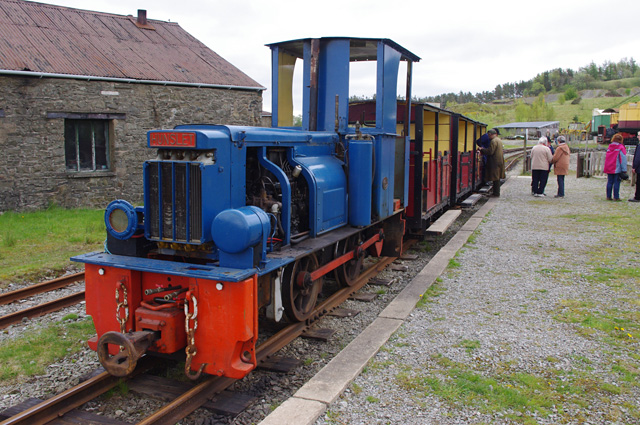
Hunslet diesel locomotive

== Open-air exhibition ==
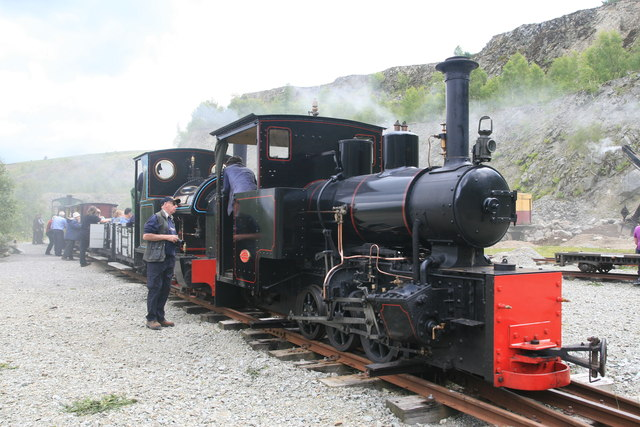
Visiting Hudswell Clarke steam locomotive

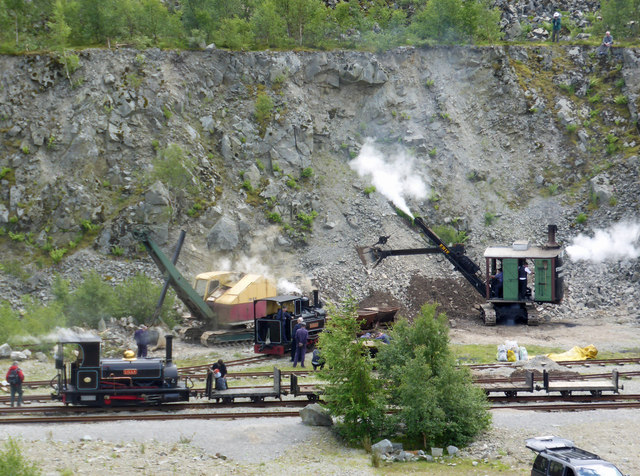
Steam-powered quarrying

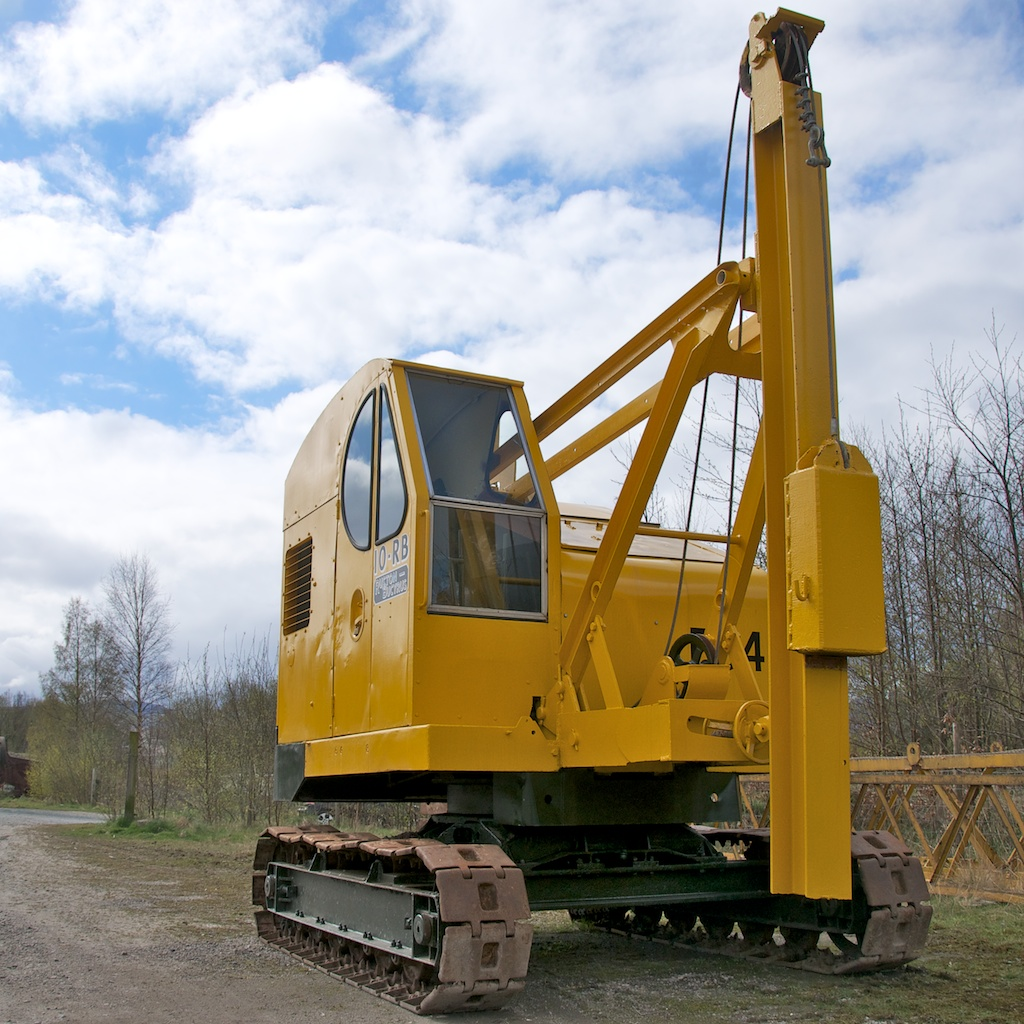
Ruston pile driver

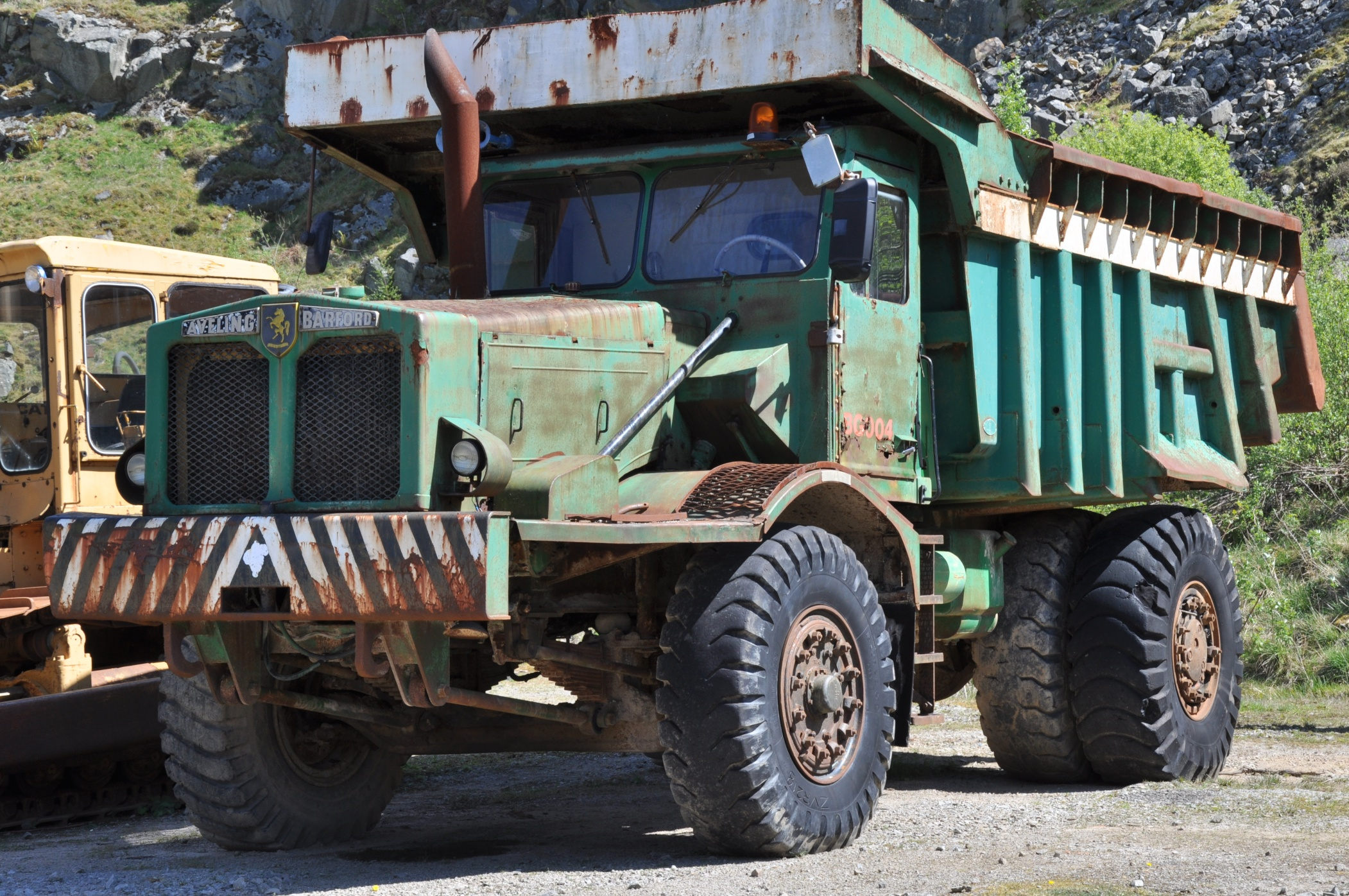
Aveling-Barford dump truck

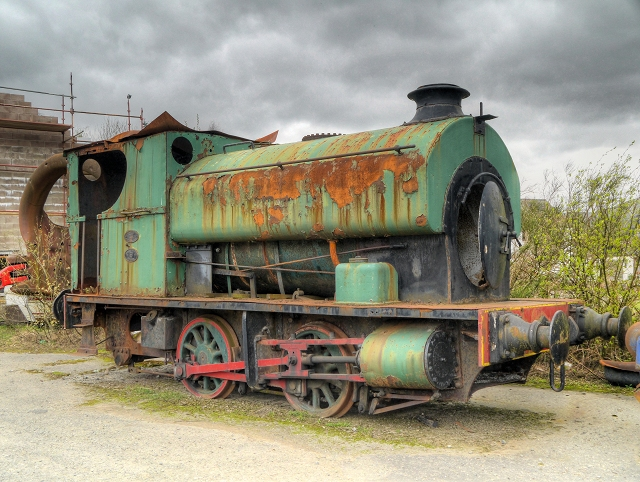
Avonside Steam locomotive
