= Glenderaterra Beck =

River in Cumbria, England

Coordinates: 54.6130°N 3.0869°W

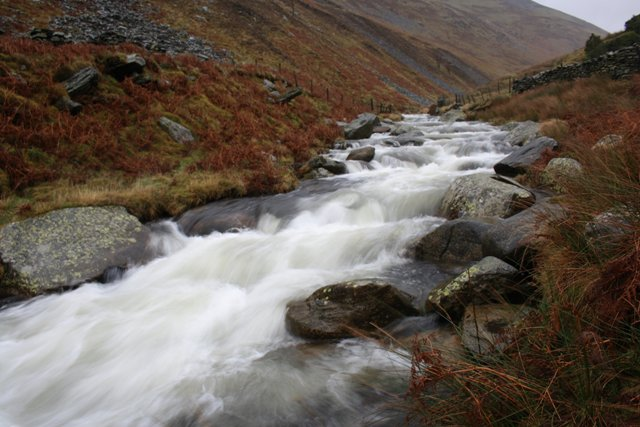
Glenderaterra Beck near the Blencathra Field Centre

Glenderaterra Beck is a watercourse in the county of Cumbria, England. The length of the Glenderaterra, and its major tributary Whit Beck is 4.8 miles (7.8 km), which have a total catchment area of 11.8 square kilometres (4.6 sq mi).

The beck runs from its source on Burnt Horse through the valley between Lonscale Fell and Blencathra to its confluence with the River Greta at Brundholme near Threlkeld.

Although the top of the stream from Burnt Horse is widely cited as the source of the Glenderaterra, the Royal Geographical Society and other authorities state that the source of a river is the furthest point from its mouth or confluence with the river it meets downstream, regardless of names attached to the contributing flows. So, the source must be Roughten Gill which starts on Blencathra, under Halls Fell top and turns the corner at a delightful and well-hidden sheepfold. It is longer than the stream in Sinen Gill which in turn is longer than the Burnt Horse contributor.

On its southerly course, Glenderaterra Beck is joined by Sinen Gill and Roughten Gill, draining Blease Fell on Blencathra, and, lower down, Whit Beck, emanating from Jenkin Hill on Skiddaw.
