= Berrier =

Hamlet in Cumbria, England

Coordinates: 54.65°N 02.93°W

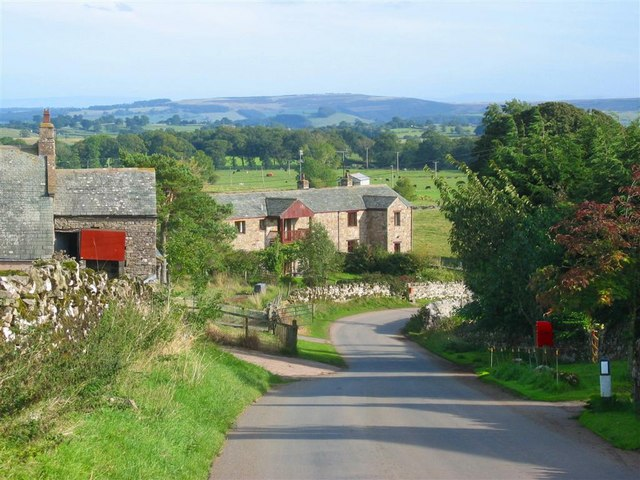
- Berrier

- Location in Eden, Cumbria Location within Cumbria
- OS grid reference: NY4029
- Civil parish: Mungrisdale
- Unitary authority: Westmorland and Furness
- Ceremonial county: Cumbria
- Region: North West
- Country: England
- Sovereign state: United Kingdom
- Post town: PENRITH
- Postcode district: CA11
- Dialling code: 017684
- Police: Cumbria
- Fire: Cumbria
- Ambulance: North West
- UK Parliament: Westmorland and Lonsdale

Berrier is a hamlet in Cumbria, England. It is in the civil parish of Mungrisdale, which is made up of eight hamlets and had a population of 297 in the 2011 United Kingdom census. The civil parish of Berrier and Murrah existed from 1866 to 1934, Murrah being a nearby hamlet.

== Toponymy ==
Berrier means 'hill shieling' – from Old English (OE) berg 'hill', and Old Norse (ON) erg 'shieling, hill pasture'. Murrah is "a compound of OE mōr, 'marsh', and ON (v)rá, 'nook, corner'."

== See also ==
- Listed buildings in Mungrisdale
