= Mosedale, Cumbria =

Hamlet in Cumbria, England

Coordinates: 54.681°N 2.998°W

Mosedale
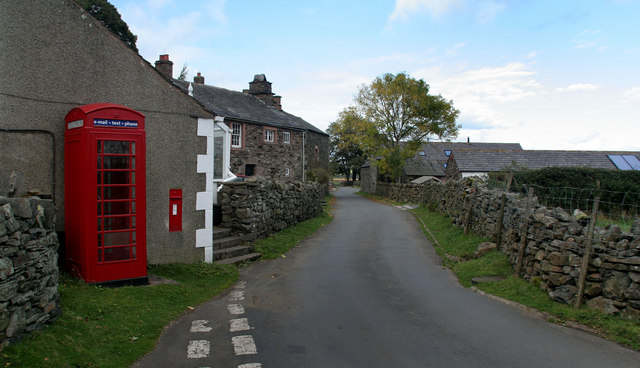
- View of Mosedale in 2009, showing phone box and post box

- Location in Eden, Cumbria Location within Cumbria
- OS grid reference: NY356322
- Civil parish: Mungrisdale
- Unitary authority: Westmorland and Furness
- Ceremonial county: Cumbria
- Region: North West
- Country: England
- Sovereign state: United Kingdom
- Post town: PENRITH
- Postcode district: CA11
- Dialling code: 017687
- Police: Cumbria
- Fire: Cumbria
- Ambulance: North West
- UK Parliament: Westmorland and Lonsdale

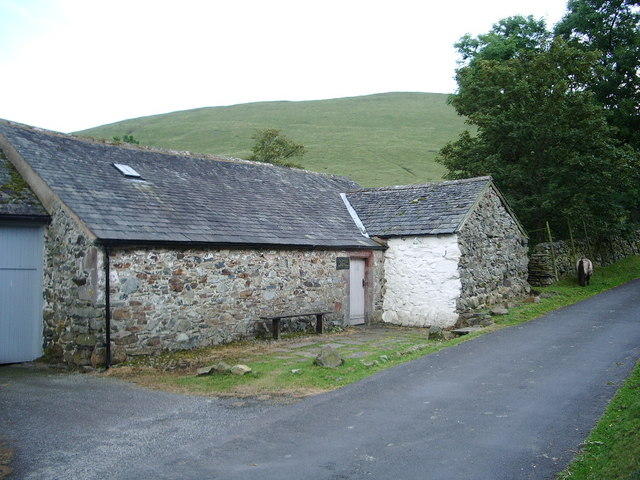
Mosedale Quaker Meeting House

Mosedale is a hamlet and former civil parish, now in the parish of Mungrisdale in the Westmorland and Furness district, in the county of Cumbria, in the north west of the English Lake District. It is on the River Caldew, north east of Bowscale Fell and south east of Carrock Fell, about one mile north of Mungrisdale. In 1931 the parish had a population of 49. In the 2011 United Kingdom census the parish of Mungrisdale, comprising eight hamlets including Mosedale, had a population of 297.

There is a Quaker meeting house in Mosedale, where meetings are held weekly in summer and fortnightly in winter. The meeting house was created in 1702 from an earlier building, was used for regular meetings until 1865, became an Anglican chapel of ease 1936–1970, and was restored for use by Quakers in 1973. It is one of the earliest meeting houses in Cumbria and is associated with George Fox, the founder of the Quakers.

== History ==
Mosedale was formerly a township in Caldbeck parish, from 1866 Mosedale was a civil parish in its own right until it was abolished on 1 April 1934 and merged with Mungrisdale.

== See also ==
- Listed buildings in Mungrisdale
