= Bowscale =

Hamlet in Cumbria, England

Coordinates: 54.675°N 2.996°W

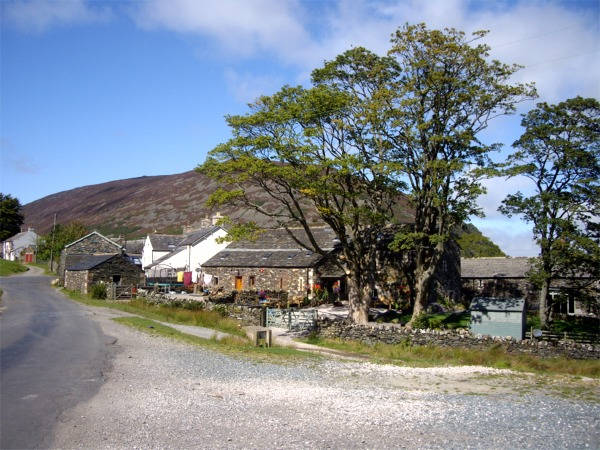
- Bowscale

- Location in Eden, Cumbria Location within Cumbria
- OS grid reference: NY357315
- Civil parish: Mungrisdale
- Unitary authority: Westmorland and Furness
- Ceremonial county: Cumbria
- Region: North West
- Country: England
- Sovereign state: United Kingdom
- Post town: PENRITH
- Postcode district: CA11
- Dialling code: 017687
- Police: Cumbria
- Fire: Cumbria
- Ambulance: North West
- UK Parliament: Westmorland and Lonsdale

Bowscale is a hamlet and former civil parish, now in the parish of Mungrisdale, in the Westmorland and Furness district, in the county of Cumbria, England. In 1931 the parish had a population of 27. The sable tarn in Sir Walter Scott's poem The Bridal of Triermain was reportedly based on Bowscale Tarn.

== History ==
Bowscale was formerly a township in Greystoke parish, from 1866 Bowscale was a civil parish in its own right until it was abolished on 1 April 1934 and merged with Mungrisdale, which is made up of eight hamlets and had a population of 297 in the 2011 United Kingdom census.
