= Mungrisdale =

Coordinates: 54.663°N 2.989°W

- Village and parish
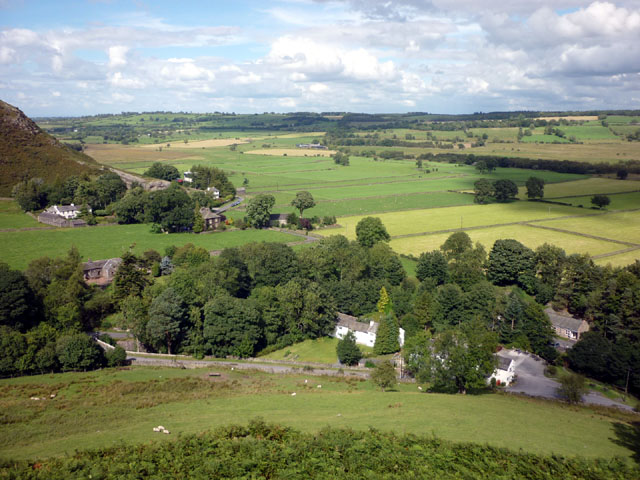
- Mungrisdale

- Location within Cumbria
- Population: 297 (2011)
- OS grid reference: NY3630
- Civil parish: Mungrisdale
- Unitary authority: Westmorland and Furness
- Ceremonial county: Cumbria
- Region: North West
- Country: England
- Sovereign state: United Kingdom
- Post town: PENRITH
- Postcode district: CA11
- Dialling code: 01768
- Police: Cumbria
- Fire: Cumbria
- Ambulance: North West
- UK Parliament: Westmorland and Lonsdale

Mungrisdale is a small village and civil parish in the north east of the English Lake District in the historic county of Cumberland but now in the ceremonial county of Cumbria. It is also the name of the valley in which the village sits. Mungrisdale is a popular starting point for ascents of the nearby hills, such as Bowscale Fell, Bannerdale Crags and Souther Fell. It lies on the River Glenderamackin, a tributary of the Greta.

Mungrisdale has no local amenities except for the Grade II* listed St Kentigern's Church built in 1756, a village hall and a pub, the Mill Inn.

The civil parish of Mungrisdale is made up of the hamlets of Berrier, Bowscale, Haltcliff Bridge, Heggle Lane, Hutton Roof, Mosedale, Mungrisdale and Murrah. The parish had a population of 284 in 2001, increasing to 297 at the 2011 Census. Part of the parish lies within the Skiddaw Group SSSI (Site of Special Scientific Interest).

== See also ==
- Listed buildings in Mungrisdale
- Mungrisdale Common
