= Souther Fell =

Mountain in the Lake District, England

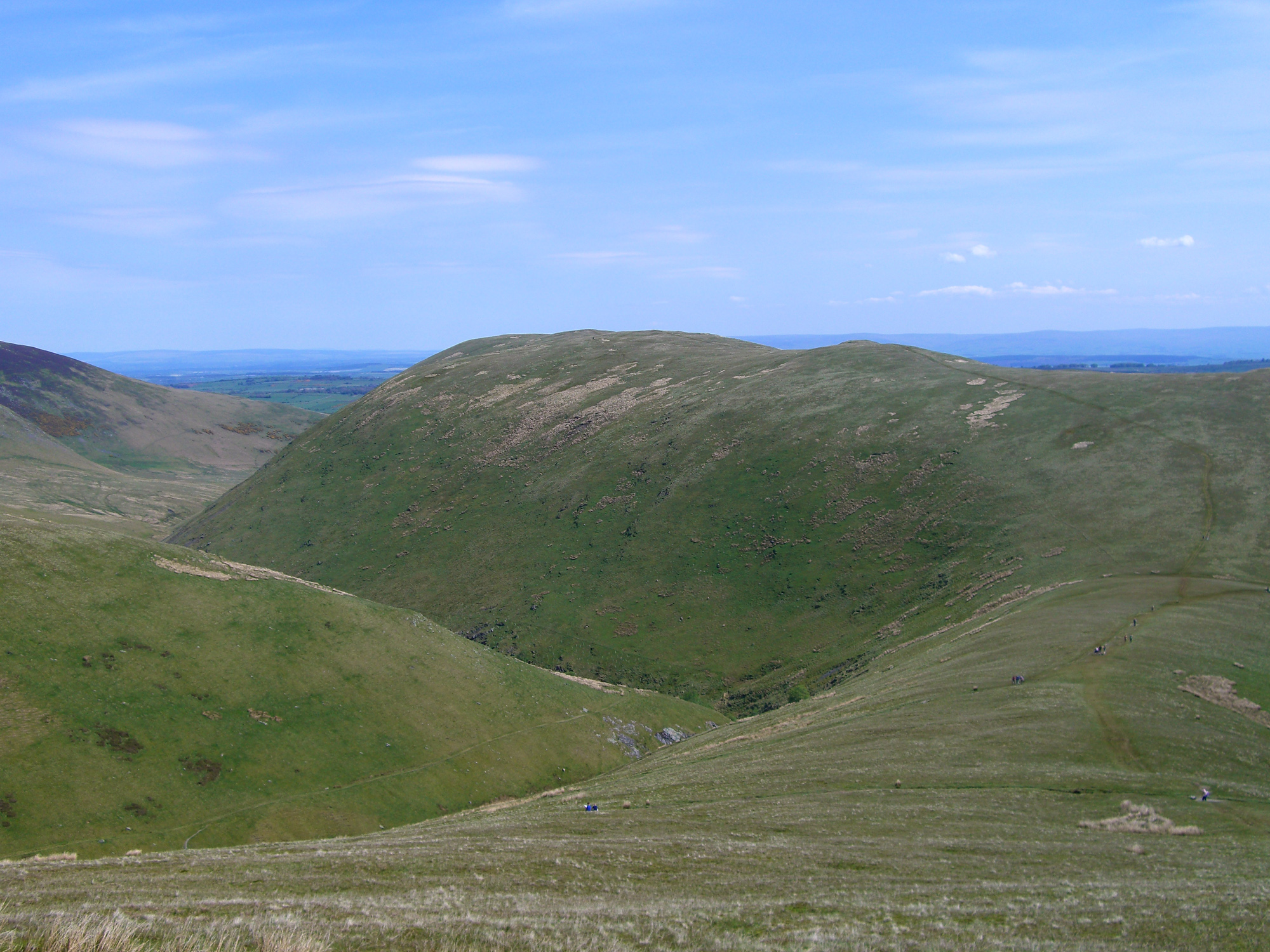
- Seen across Mousethwaite Col from Scales Fell on Blencathra.

Highest point
- Elevation: 522 m (1,713 ft)
- Prominence: c. 87 m
- Parent peak: Blencathra
- Listing: Wainwright
- Coordinates: 54°39′14″N 3°00′04″W

Geography
- Location within the Lake District
- Location: Cumbria, England
- Parent range: Lake District, Northern Fells
- OS grid: NY355292
- Topo map: OS Landranger 89, 90 OS Explorer OL5

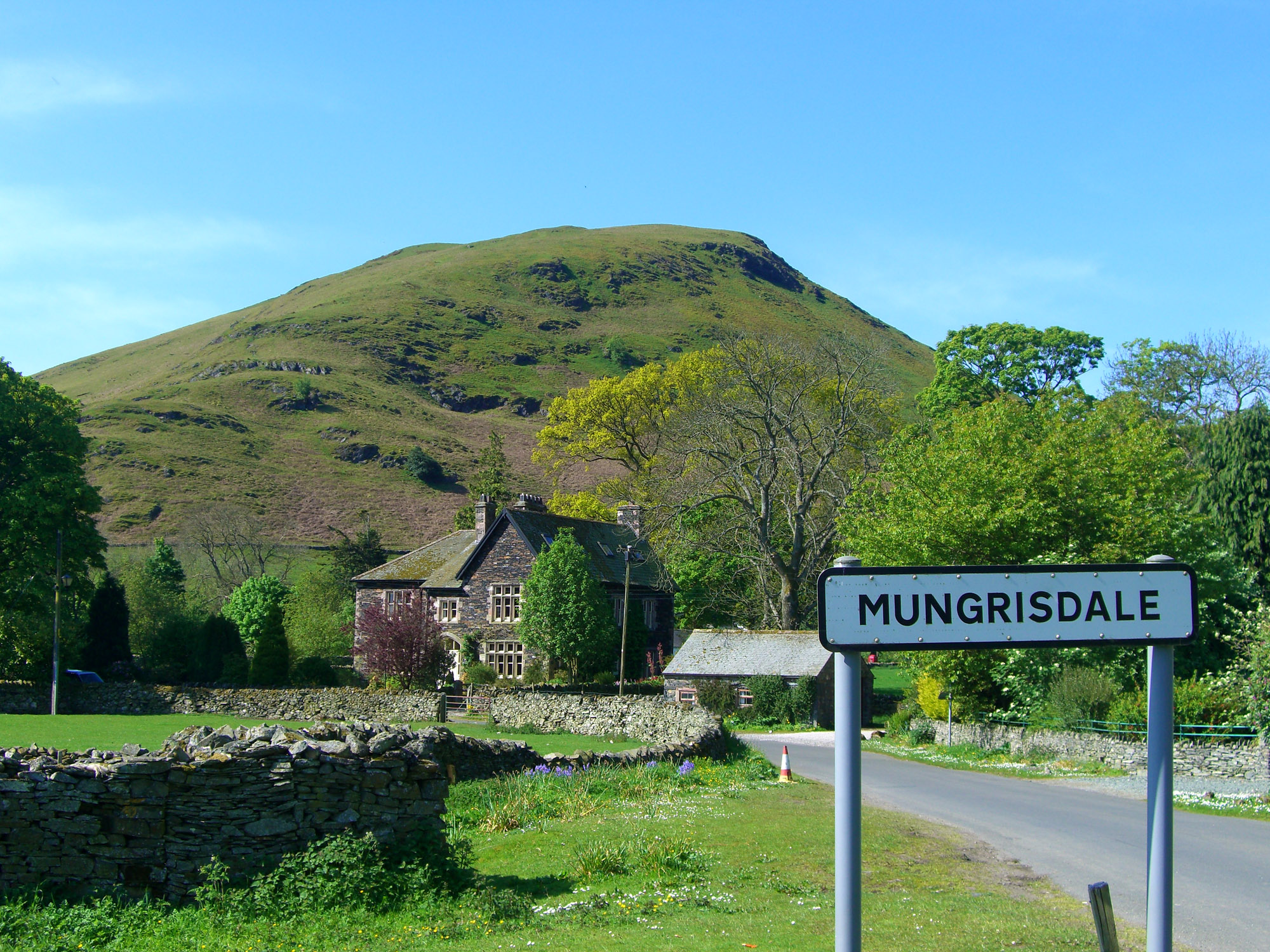
Seen from the village of Mungrisdale.

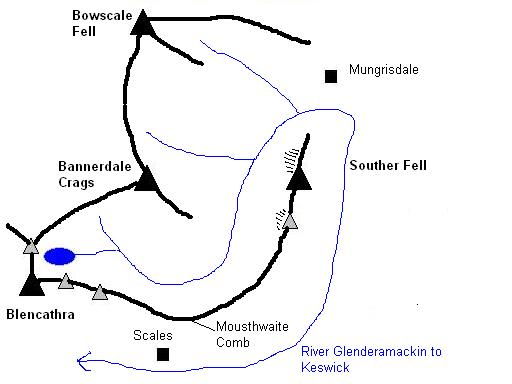
Map of Souther Fell

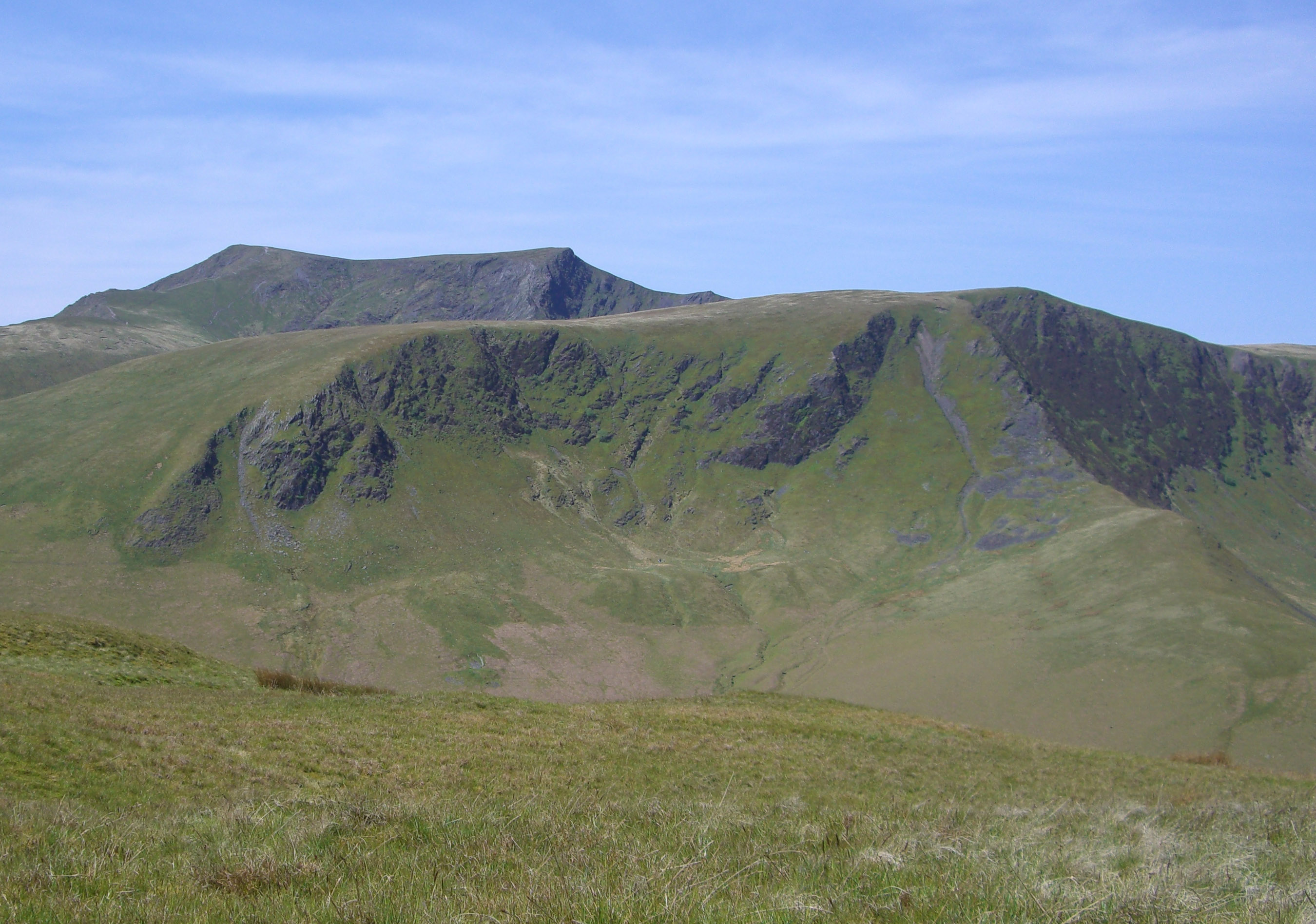
The view west from the summit takes in Blencathra and Bannerdale Crags.

Souther Fell is a fell in the English Lake District. It stands to the south of Mungrisdale village in the Northern Fells. It is most famous for the appearance of a "spectral army", said to have been seen marching along its crest on Midsummer's Day, 1745. No such force was in the District at the time.

== Topography ==
Souther Fell is the eastern extremity of Blencathra, a continuation of the arm that runs down from the summit over Doddick Fell and Scales Fell. A smooth slope falls eastward from Scales Fell to the col of Mousthwaite Comb at 1,425 feet (434 m). The ridge then turns northeast for two miles along the summit of Souther Fell.

Mousthwaite Comb is a geographical oddity. To the north of the depression, running eastward, is the River Glenderamackin. To the south of the col, flowing westward, is the same river. In the intervening time the Glenderamackin has run for six miles, surrounding Souther Fell on three sides like a moat. The Comb provides its only dryshod connection to other ground and even this is almost cut off by the tributary of Comb Beck on the southern slope.

The far northern end of the ridge falls quite steeply to a bend of the Glenderamackin, across which is the village of Mungrisdale. The eastern flanks are quite smooth and towards the south have been enclosed to provide pasture land. Southernfell, Far Southernfell and Hazelhurst are the farms here. At the southern end, on the turn of the ridge, is the rockier slope of Knotts, falling toward the main Keswick to Penrith road.

The western side of the fell stands above the enclosed valley of the upper Glenderamackin, looking across to Bannerdale Crags. Souther Fell has two principal tops and each stands above a patch of scree and rock on this face. A footbridge crosses the river just north of Mousthwaite Comb, the only reliable crossing between here and Mungrisdale village.

== Geology ==
In common with much of the Northern Fells, the Kirk Stile Formation of the Skiddaw Group predominates. This is composed of laminated mudstone and siltstone with greywacke sandstone and is of Ordovician age.

== The "Spectral Army" of Souther Fell ==
On the evening of Midsummer's Day 1745, a line of marching troops, cavalry and even carriages was seen travelling along the summit ridge of Souther Fell. The ground over which they appeared to move was known to be too steep for such transport, but the procession continued unabated for some hours until night fell, constantly appearing at one end of the ridge and disappearing at the other. 26 sober and respected witnesses were assembled to view the proceedings and later testified on oath to what they had seen. The next day Souther Fell was climbed and not a footprint was found on the soft ground of the ridge. One scientific explanation offered was that this was some bizarre mirage or reflection of the army of Bonnie Prince Charlie, that day exercising on the Scottish coast, while another explanation suggests that the sighting was originally misidentifying the smoke from Germanic bonfire rituals, with the story of the "Spectral Army" evolving over the years through transmission and adaptation in the popular press.

== Summit ==
Souther Fell has two main tops, although a number of other bumps crown the ridge. That to the northeast is the true summit, the southern top being perhaps 30 ft lower. A small cairn marks the top.

This being the last of the Northern Fells in that direction, the view across to the Pennines is uninterrupted. The Lakeland view peeps around the looming presence of Blencathra, taking in Great Gable, the Scafells, the nearer Helvellyn range and a portion of the Far Eastern Fells.

== Ascents ==
From Scales on the A66 road an ascent can be made up Comb Gill to Mousthwaite Comb. From Mungrisdale Wainwright propounds a direct route across the fields behind the Mill Inn. Birkett, however, notes that this is no public right of way and suggests a diversion to the south.
