= Threlkeld =

Village and civil parish in Cumbria, England

Coordinates: 54.61917°N 3.05148°W

- Village and parish
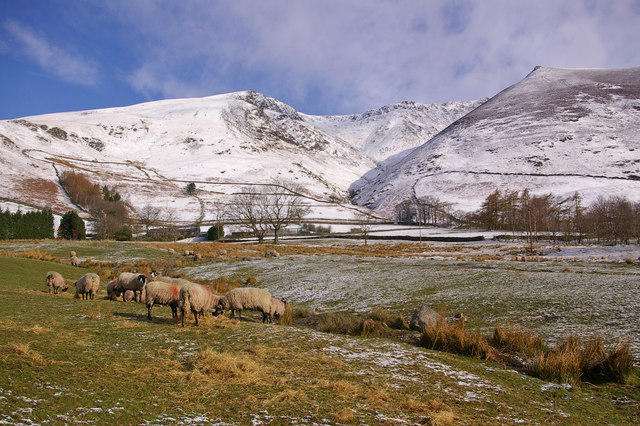
- Blease Gill

- Location within Cumbria
- Population: 423 (2011)
- OS grid reference: NY3125
- Civil parish: Threlkeld
- Unitary authority: Westmorland and Furness
- Ceremonial county: Cumbria
- Region: North West
- Country: England
- Sovereign state: United Kingdom
- Post town: KESWICK
- Postcode district: CA12
- Dialling code: 017687
- Police: Cumbria
- Fire: Cumbria
- Ambulance: North West
- UK Parliament: Westmorland and Lonsdale

Threlkeld is a village and civil parish in the north of the Lake District in Cumbria, England, to the east of Keswick. It is in the historic county of Cumberland. It lies at the southern foot of Blencathra, one of the more prominent fells in the northern Lake District, and to the north of the River Glenderamackin. The parish had a population of 454 in the 2001 census, decreasing to 423 at the Census 2011. Part of the parish lies within the Skiddaw Group SSSI (Site of Special Scientific Interest).

== Overview ==
The name is of Norse origin and is a combination of thraell, meaning slave or serf, and kelda, meaning a spring or well. There was extensive Norse settlement in the area during the era of Viking expansion (790s–1066). Thraell was probably a reference to native Cumbrians subjugated by the incoming Norse. Historically a part of Cumberland, Threlkeld formerly had its own railway station on the Cockermouth, Keswick and Penrith Railway, on the opposite side of the valley, next to the (closed) Threlkeld Quarry, at the foot of Clough Head. Today the railway line is a footpath and cycle track. Three rows of terraced houses, which used to accommodate the quarry workers, stand near the station. The Threlkeld Quarry and Mining Museum is open nearby and operates the 2 ft (610 mm) narrow gauge Threlkeld Quarry Railway for tourists to enjoy.

Two pubs are located opposite each other in the village: The Salutation and the Horse and Farrier. There is also a Coffee Shop, a vibrant Village Hall, and a small church, St Mary's, in the village.

From 1904 to 1958 High Row, Threlkeld was the site of the Blencathra Isolation Hospital, one of the first Sanatoria in England. The hospital was eventually closed due to the fall in tuberculosis cases. From 1958 to 1972 it served as a long term stay home for the elderly, and it then became a residential centre for the Field Studies Council.

== Transport ==
As of March 2026, three bus routes serve the village. The X4/X5 to Penrith or Workington via Keswick and Cockermouth. The third route is the 509 to Harstop or Penrith via Aira force. All routes are run by Stagecoach.

== See also ==
- Listed buildings in Threlkeld
- Threlkeld railway station
