= Rawnsley =

Rawnsley is a family name; it may refer to:

People

- Andrew Rawnsley (born 1962), British political journalist
- Brenda Rawnsley (1916-2007), British arts campaigner and arts education activist
- David Rawnsley (1909–1977), British art director
- Hardwicke Rawnsley (1851-1920), English clergyman, poet, writer of hymns and conservationist
- John Rawnsley (born 1950), English actor and opera singer
- Jimmy Rawnsley (1904-1965), English night fighter radar operator
- Kenneth Rawnsley (1926-1992), English psychiatrist
- Matthew Rawnsley (born 1976), English cricketer
- Willingham Franklin Rawnsley (1845?–1927), British author and school proprietor

Places

- Rawnsley, Staffordshire, village in England
- Rawnsley's Bluff, geological feature in Australia

Other

- Rawnsley's bowerbird, rare intergeneric hybrid between the satin bowerbird and regent bowerbird
