= Great Crosthwaite =

Area of Keswick, Cumbria, England

Coordinates: 54.6078°N 3.1457°W

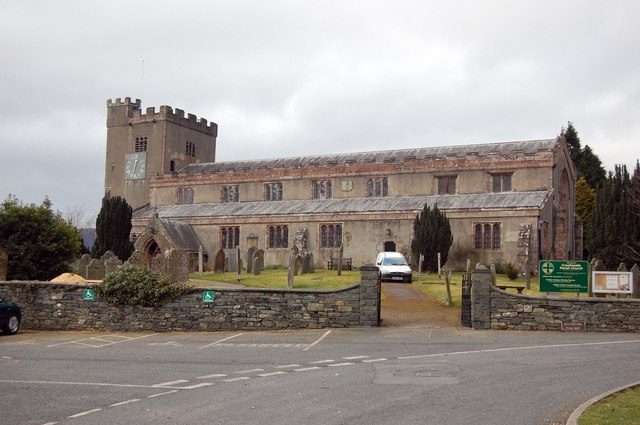
St Kentigern's Church

Great Crosthwaite is a suburb of Keswick in the Lake District, in the Cumberland district of Cumbria, England.

== History ==
The settlement at Great Crosthwaite stands north of the River Greta, and was historically separate from the town of Keswick south of the river. Great Crosthwaite gave its name to the ancient parish of Crosthwaite, which also included Keswick and an extensive surrounding rural area. The parish church of St Kentigern stands on a site believed to have been occupied by a church since the 6th century; the building was substantially rebuilt in the early 16th century but incorporating parts of the earlier structures.

Keswick was granted a market charter in 1276, allowing a weekly market to be held on Saturdays. In the late 13th and early 14th centuries, an informal weekly market was also held on Sundays at Great Crosthwaite. In 1306, the inhabitants of Cockermouth petitioned parliament to take action against the market at Great Crosthwaite, on the basis that it was harming their market. A proclamation was duly issued and the market at Great Crosthwaite was discontinued.

The parish of Crosthwaite was subdivided into eight townships, some of which had chapels of ease: Borrowdale, Braithwaite, Keswick, Newlands, Portinscale, St John's Castlerigg and Wythburn, Thornthwaite, and Underskiddaw. The settlement of Great Crosthwaite itself and the parish church were in the Underskiddaw township. From the 17th century onwards, parishes were gradually given various civil functions under the poor laws, in addition to their original ecclesiastical functions. In some cases, including Crosthwaite, the civil functions were exercised by subdivisions of the parish rather than the parish as a whole. Crosthwaite parish was split into five parts for the purposes of administering the poor laws. Braithwaite, Newlands, Portinscale, and Thornthwaite were administered together as an area called Above Derwent, whilst the other four townships each took on poor law functions separately. In 1866, the legal definition of 'parish' was changed to be the areas used for administering the poor laws, and so Above Derwent, Borrowdale, Keswick, St John's Castlerigg and Wythburn, and Underskiddaw each became civil parishes.

The township of Keswick was made a local board district in 1853. The district was enlarged in 1876 and again in 1894; the expansion in 1894 included transferring Great Crosthwaite from the civil parish of Underskiddaw into the civil parish and local board district of Keswick. Great Crosthwaite has therefore been administered as part of Keswick since 1894.

== Features ==
Within Great Crosthwaite there is the Mary Hewtson Cottage Hospital, the Howard Allen Hall Sports Hall, Keswick School and Keswick Cycle Hire.

== Transport ==
For transport there is the A5271 road going past Great Crosthwaite and through Keswick town centre, the B5289 road nearby, the A591 road going south towards Kendal and Windermere and north towards Little Crosthwaite and Carlisle and the A66 road by-passing Keswick. There is a roundabout on the by-pass where the A66 road, the A591 road and the A5271 road meet, called Crosthwaite Roundabout.

== Nearby waters ==
Nearby waters include Derwent Water, the River Greta and the River Derwent are also nearby. Nearby settlements include Portinscale and Braithwaite.
