= Edward Stephenson (colonial administrator) =

Edward Stephenson (c. 1691 – 7 September 1768) was an administrator of the English East India Company. He served as President of Bengal in the mid eighteenth century. He was born in Keswick, Cumberland, in the north west of England. After his service in India he retired to his native town, where his land holdings included two fields between Keswick and Portinscale named the Howrahs, a title thought to commemorate his place of residence in India, Howrah, near Calcutta. His other properties included Governor's House in Lake Road, Keswick. He died there at the age of 77.

== Notes ==
Political offices
Preceded by Henry Frankland	President of Bengal; 17 September – 18 September 1728	Succeeded by John Deane
