= John Deane (colonial administrator) =

Administrator of the English East India Company

- Occupation: Colonial Administrator
- Known for: President of Bengal

John Deane was an administrator of the English East India Company. He served as President of Bengal in the early eighteenth century.

For over twenty years, he lived with an Indian mistress, Mussumaut Matloob Brish, with whom he had six children.

Political offices
Preceded by Samuel Flake	President of Bengal; 17 January 1723 – 30 January 1726	Succeeded by Henry Frankland
Preceded by Edward Stephenson	President of Bengal; 18 September 1728 – 25 February 1732	Succeeded by John Stackhouse
