= Open Spaces Society =

UK registered charity championing public paths and open spaces

The Open Spaces Society is a campaign group that works to protect public rights of way and open spaces in the United Kingdom, such as common land and village greens. It is Britain's oldest national conservation body and a registered charity.

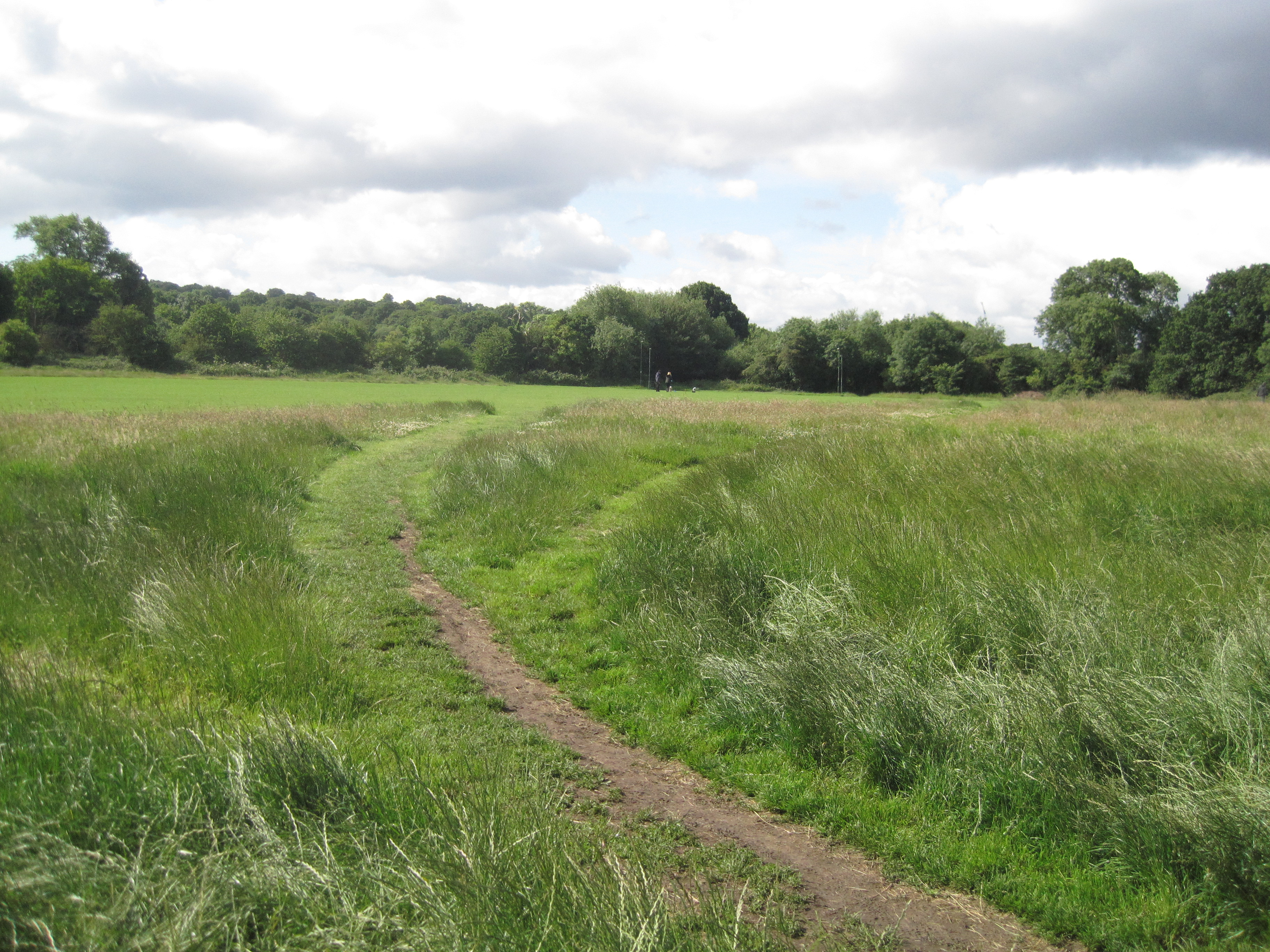
Hampstead Heath

== Founding ==
The society was founded as the Commons Preservation Society and merged with the National Footpaths Society in 1899, becoming the Commons and Footpaths Preservation Society. It later renamed itself the Commons, Open Spaces and Footpaths Preservation Society, before adopting the present name.

An early example of direct action taken by the society was its overnight removal of two miles of railings that enclosed Berkhamsted common in 1866 with the aid of 120 people. The society also campaigned for the creation of the National Trust.

Its founders and early members included John Stuart Mill, Lord Eversley, William Morris, Sir Robert Hunter, and Octavia Hill. The last two founded the National Trust in 1895 along with Canon Rawnsley. Lord Eversley, as George Lefevre, was a Liberal member of parliament and became a junior minister at the Board of Trade in Gladstone’s government. He held other posts, including Commissioner of Works, and opened Hampton Court Park, Kew Gardens and Regent’s Park to the public.

== Subsequent growth ==
Over the last century and a half the Society has preserved commons for the enjoyment of the public. It has also been active in protecting the historical and vital rights-of-way network through England and Wales. Its early successes included saving Hampstead Heath from gravel extraction, Epping Forest, Wimbledon Common, Ashdown Forest, and the Malvern Hills. After both world wars the society’s difficult task was to reinstate much common land which had been used for defence and food production.

In the late 1960s, following the enactment of the Commons Registration Act 1965, the Open Spaces Society worked hard to register common land and common rights.

== Function ==
The stated objectives of the Society are:

- To campaign for stronger protection and opportunities for everyone to enjoy commons, greens and paths.
- To defend open spaces against loss and pressures from development.
- To assist local communities so that they can safeguard their green spaces for future generations to enjoy.

Much of the Open Spaces Society's work is concerned with the preservation and creation of public paths. The word 'footpaths' was included in the Society’s title after it amalgamated with the National Footpaths Preservation Society in 1899. Before the introduction of official maps of public paths in the early 1950s, the public did not know where paths were, and the Open Spaces Society helped the successful campaign for paths to be shown on Ordnance Survey maps. Its work also includes helping to protect common land, town and village greens, open spaces and public paths. It advises the Department for Environment, Food and Rural Affairs and National Assembly for Wales on applications for works on common land. Local authorities are legally required to consult the Society whenever there is a proposal to alter the route of a public right of way. To facilitate part of its charitable aims, the Open Spaces Society is active in other areas; it has representatives on government working parties, national bodies, and more localised bodies. It also has some of its members representing it as local correspondents in various parts of the country.

Today, the Society has its headquarters in Henley-on-Thames in Oxfordshire. It has over 2,600 members throughout England and Wales. It publishes a members' magazine Open Spaces, with three issues per year.

== Countryside and Rights of Way Act 2000 ==
In 1986, the "Common Land Forum", comprising all the interests in common land, recommended that there should be a public right to walk on all commons in England and Wales, coupled with management of the land. (All commons have a landowner, ranging from a public body to a private individual.) The then government backed the forum’s proposals for legislation and promised to introduce such a law – but did not. More than a decade later, with the Open Spaces Society's help the right was won under the Countryside and Rights of Way Act 2000, to walk on all those commons which previously had no access, subject to certain restrictions.

=== Supreme Court decisions ===
On 11 December 2019, a Supreme Court of the United Kingdom decision raised concerns at the society. The primary case involved 13 hectares of land in south Lancaster, the Mooreside Fields, owned by Lancashire County Council. The land had been available for public use for over 50 years. According to the Commons Act 2006, land used for informal recreation for at least 20 years can be registered as a green and is then protected from development. (The Growth and Infrastructure Act 2013 specified that land designated for planning applications could not be registered as a village green, but that did not apply in the Moorside Fields case.)

The Moorside Fields Community Group attempted to register the lands in 2016 under the Commons Act. The local authority challenged the registration, wanting to retain control of the lands for future expansion of the nearby Moorside Primary School's playing fields. The council's challenge failed in the High Court and then in the Court of Appeal; the registration of the land as a village green could proceed. Lancashire County Council subsequently appealed to the Supreme Court of the United Kingdom.

In the appeal decision, cited as R (on the application of Lancashire County Council) (Appellant) v Secretary of State for the Environment, Food and Rural Affairs (Respondent) the Supreme Court overturned the previous judgments. At the same time, the court also ruled against the registration of lands in a separate case in Surrey involving the 2.9 hectare Leach Grove Wood at Leatherhead, owned by the National Health Service. After publication of the decision in the Moorside Fields case, Lancashire County Council told the news media that the court had "protect[ed] this land for future generations".

In effect, the Supreme Court decision left lands owned by public authorities by their statutory powers open to development for any purpose that they deem to be appropriate. This could have far-reaching ramifications in England and Wales, according to the Open Spaces Society.
