= Hardwicke Rawnsley =

Anglican priest, poet, local politician and conservationist

The Reverend Hardwicke Drummond Rawnsley

Chaplain to the King
- In office 1912–1920

Canon of Carlisle Cathedral
- In office 1891–1920

Vicar of Crosthwaite
- In office 1883–1917

Vicar of Wray
- In office 1877–1883

Personal details
- Born: 29 September 1851 Shiplake, Oxfordshire, England
- Died: 28 May 1920, aged 68 Grasmere, Westmorland, England
- Party: Independent
- Education: Uppingham School; Balliol College, Oxford
- Known for: Co-founding the National Trust

Hardwicke Drummond Rawnsley (29 September 1851 – 28 May 1920) was an Anglican priest, poet, local politician and conservationist. He became nationally and internationally known as one of the three founders of the National Trust for Places of Historic Interest or Natural Beauty in the 1890s.

Rawnsley was descended from a line of Church of England vicars, and after briefly considering medicine as a career he graduated from Oxford and took holy orders. In the mid-1870s he worked with the urban poor in London and Bristol, before being appointed in 1877 to a rural parish in Westmorland in the English Lake District. He soon became a vigorous activist in the campaign to preserve the region from excessive industrial development.

In 1883 Rawnsley was appointed Vicar of Crosthwaite, Cumberland, in the north of the Lake District. He remained in the post for 34 years, becoming known locally and nationally for his energetic efforts to improve life for working people. He and his wife Edith founded the Keswick School of Industrial Art, and he led campaigns to make access to the countryside available for everyone. Concluding that protests and legislation were not enough to protect the environment, he joined Robert Hunter and Octavia Hill in 1893 to found the National Trust to own land on the public's behalf. It grew to become one of Britain's largest and most important landowners, holding land and buildings in trust for the people of Britain.

Rawnsley was a prolific writer, publishing more than 40 books, including verse, sermons, historical studies, travel accounts and biographies. He retired in 1917 and moved to the village of Grasmere, in the southern Lake District, where he died in 1920, aged 68.

== Life and career ==
=== Early years ===
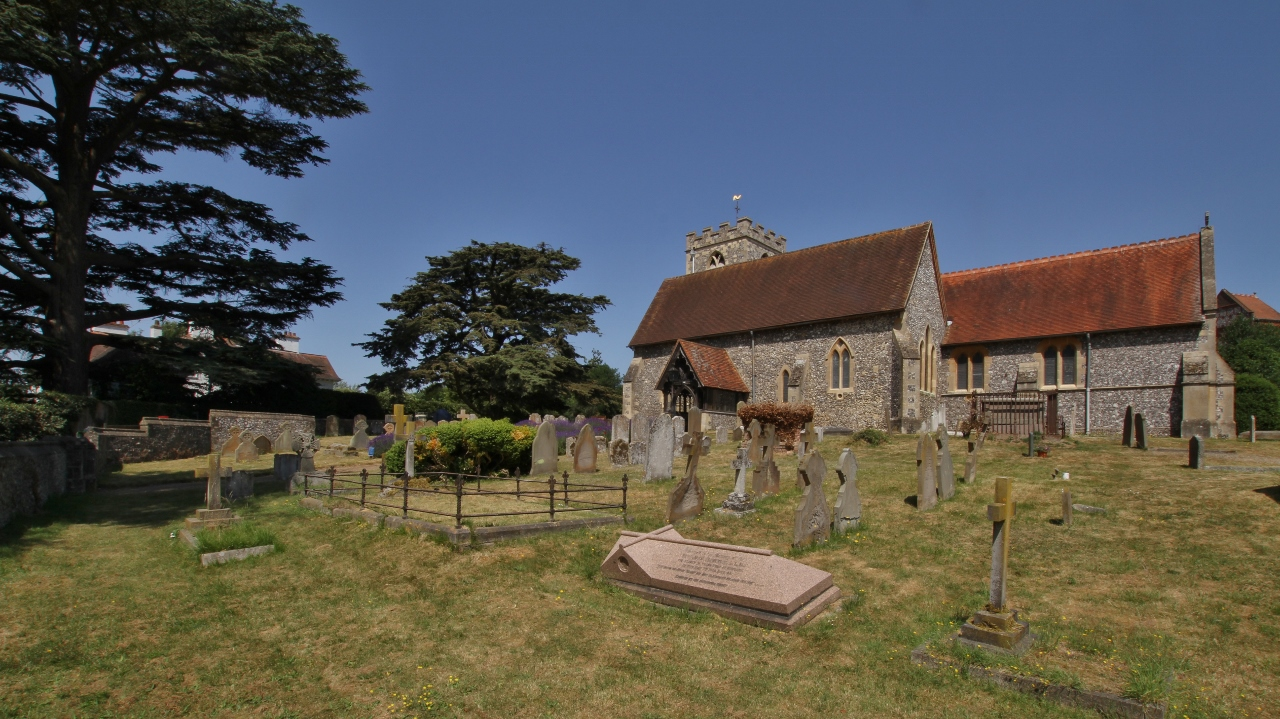
Parish church at Shiplake in Oxfordshire. Rawnsley was born in the rectory.

Hardwicke Rawnsley – known to his family and intimates as "Hardie" – was born at the rectory, Shiplake, Oxfordshire on 29 September 1851. He was the second son and fourth of the ten children of the Rev Robert Drummond Burrell Rawnsley (1817–1882) and his wife, Catherine Ann, née Franklin (1818–1892). (Note: Of Hardwicke Rawnsley's five brothers, Willingham (1845–1927) became well known as an author and schoolmaster; Alfred Edward (1852–1922) became an officer in the Royal Navy; Walter Hugh (1856–1936) became an army officer and later High Sheriff of Lincolnshire; Arthur Eden (1859–1880) died young; and John Franklin (1862–1924) became Squire of Candlesby in Lincolnshire.) In 1862 Drummond Rawnsley accepted the post of vicar of Halton Holegate in the fen district of Lincolnshire. According to Hardwicke Rawnsley's biographer Vivian Griffiths, "Observing the wildlife of the Fens, the construction of the Holbeach-to-Spilsby railway and watching the navvies building embankments were to be formative influences".

Later in 1862, aged eleven, Rawnsley enrolled at Uppingham School, where his godfather, Edward Thring, was headmaster. (Note: Five of Drummond Rawnsley's six sons were sent to Uppingham. Two of them – Hardwicke and Willingham – wrote memoirs of Thring after his death in 1887.) Thring became a major influence on him: Rawnsley excelled at athletics and gymnastics, but Thring encouraged his aesthetic side, particularly his budding gifts as a poet. The historian George Bott writes:

His years as a pupil of Edward Thring imbued him with the ideas and ideals of that great headmaster: chivalrous unselfishness, sincerity and service, absolute devotion to truth, sympathy for the less fortunate, strict Christian principles.

John Ruskin, a lifelong influence on Rawnsley

In 1869, Thring introduced Rawnsley to the Lake District, staying in Grasmere village, where William Wordsworth had lived. Rawnsley quickly came to share the enthusiasm shown by Wordsworth and others for the Lake District landscape.

In 1870, Rawnsley went up to Balliol College, Oxford, initially reading classics but switching after two years to natural sciences, with the intention of becoming a medical practitioner. He was at first an exuberant undergraduate, prominent in athletics and rowing, and not conspicuously conscientious about his studies. His outlook became more serious under the influence of the art critic and social campaigner John Ruskin. Rawnsley was one of a group of undergraduate volunteers – others were Oscar Wilde and Arnold Toynbee – who undertook manual labour under Ruskin's direction to improve the road and drainage between Oxford and the village of Hinksey. The project foundered after two months when Ruskin left for Venice, but for Rawnsley it was, in Griffiths's words, "life-changing, his social conscience awakened". He began to think that the Church rather than medicine was his vocation. In 1874 he graduated with a third class degree in natural sciences and the following year was awarded his Master of Arts degree.

=== London and Bristol ===
Octavia Hill (top) and Emma Cons

After leaving Oxford, Rawnsley went to work among the urban poor in London. He was appointed lay-chaplain to the Newport Market Refuge, a hostel for the destitute, in the parish of St Mary's, Soho, an insalubrious part of London known for prostitution and poverty. Ruskin introduced him to Octavia Hill, the pioneer of social housing, and Rawnsley added to his workload the role of rent-collector for Hill's colleague Emma Cons. (Note: To Cons and other protégées of Octavia Hill the role involved not simply collecting rents but also checking every detail of the premises and getting to know the tenants personally, acting as what would later be called social workers.) Under the strain of his various activities he suffered a nervous breakdown. At Hill's suggestion he went to the Lake District to recuperate, staying first with his cousins at Wray Castle, Westmorland, and then with Thring at Grasmere and finally with Hill's friends the Fletcher family at their house near Ambleside. The eldest daughter of his host and hostess was Edith Fletcher (1846–1916); she and Rawnsley were mutually attracted, with shared interests in art, literature and nature.

In December 1875, Rawnsley, his health restored, was ordained deacon. On Thring's recommendation he was appointed to the new post of chaplain to the Clifton College mission, ministering to one of Bristol's poorest areas. At first there was no building in which services could be held, but Rawnsley secured a disused factory workshop and converted it into a chapel. The ecclesiastical authorities felt that he went too far in his efforts to attract young locals, not confining himself to religious services but organising a temperance club, regular football matches and weekend country walks. He campaigned to save the disused 14th-century St Werburgh's Church from demolition. It was taken down stone by stone and re-erected on a new site. His enthusiasms did not endear him to the conservative hierarchy of the Bristol church, but when he left his post in 1877 he was presented with a testimonial to his work by the mayor and other leading citizens.

=== Vicar of Wray ===
In 1877 Rawnsley and Edith Fletcher became engaged to be married and he began making plans for their life together. His cousin Edward Rawnsley's estate at Wray Castle contained a parish church, St Margaret of Antioch, Low Wray. The post of vicar there became vacant and Edward offered it to Rawnsley, who was ordained priest in Carlisle Cathedral on 23 December 1877 and took up the appointment at Wray.

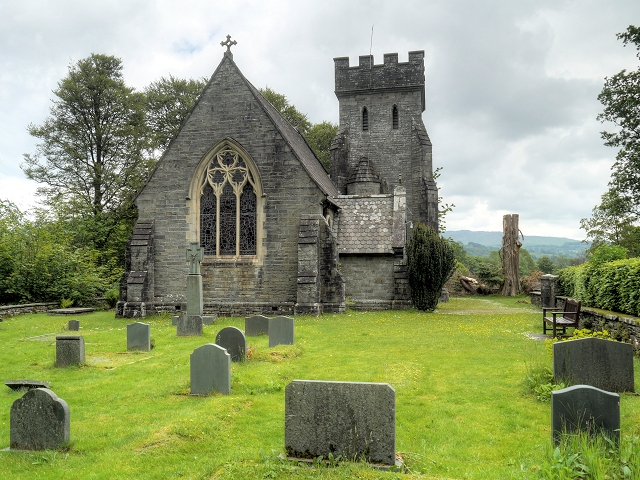
St Margaret, Low Wray, where Rawnsley was vicar from 1877 to 1883

Rawnsley and Edith were married in the Fletchers' local church at Brathay in January 1878, in a service conducted by Drummond Rawnsley. The couple's only child, Noel, was born at Wray in December 1880. According to the biographer Graham Murphy, "because of his parents' numerous activities and love of travel [Noel] suffered a somewhat solitary childhood".

By this time, Ruskin had made his home in the Lake District; since 1873 he had lived at Brantwood on the shore of Coniston Water, 22 miles from Wray. He had already been involved in a conservation campaign, unsuccessfully opposing the damming of Thirlmere to create a reservoir for the city of Manchester, nearly 100 miles away. (Note: Others opposing the scheme included Octavia Hill, Thomas Carlyle, Matthew Arnold and William Morris, but there was little genuinely local opposition, and the scheme went ahead. Rawnsley had mixed feelings about the Thirlmere development: his experiences with the urban poor in Soho and Bristol made him keenly aware of the need for fresh drinking water everywhere.) Rawnsley visited Ruskin frequently, and in 1880 they discussed "how to add happiness to the country labourer's lot". The two agreed that "idle hands should have something found for them to do by other than the Devil … We must bring joy, the joy of eye and hand-skill to our cottage homes". Ruskin suggested reviving the old craft of hand-spinning and weaving wool; Rawnsley, considering this infeasible, opted for wood carving. He recorded that "a lady was engaged to come down from South Kensington to give a course of lessons in the three villages, (Note: The three were Grasmere, Ambleside and Wray.) and our humble home industry in the lake district was set on foot." Instruction also included techniques for metal repoussé, taught by the Swiss butler from Edith Rawnsley's family home.

The young Beatrix Potter holidayed at Wray Castle with her parents in 1882. They met Rawnsley, who became a firm friend, particularly of Beatrix. His views on preserving the natural beauty of the Lake District had a lasting effect on her. He was the first published author she had met, and he took a great interest in her drawings, supporting her in her determination to have them taken seriously and later encouraging her to publish her first book, The Tale of Peter Rabbit. They remained close for the rest of Rawnsley's lifetime, and Noel Rawnsley maintained in his later years that Potter had been the real love of his father's life.

=== Campaigning against railway development ===
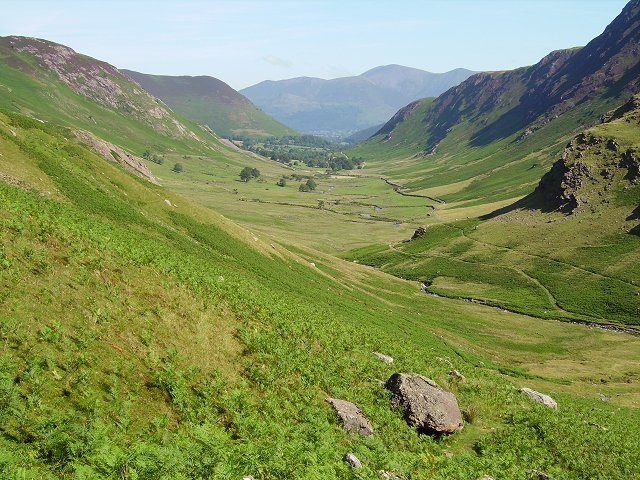
Newlands Valley: Rawnsley led the successful campaign to prevent the building of a railway there in 1883

In 1883 parliamentary approval was given for a scheme to build a railway line through the Newlands Valley to carry slate from quarries; the valley was, and is, regarded as one of the most beautiful and tranquil in the Lake District. (Note: Coleridge had written in 1778, "Newlands is indeed a lovely place" and admired "the exceeding greenness and pastoral beauty of the Vale itself", and Wordsworth had written of its beauty in a poem.) A rival scheme was proposed, to run between Ennerdale Water and the coast. Rawnsley spearheaded a campaign to stop both. Ruskin gave his support, although after the failure of his Thirlmere campaign he was not optimistic about the outcome. (Note: Ruskin told Rawnsley, "It's all of no use. – You will soon have a Cook's tourist railway up Scawfell, and another up Helvellyn, and then a connecting line all round".) Rawnsley held meetings, lobbied assiduously and wrote prolifically to legislators and newspapers. In a letter to The Standard he said:

Each year these public grounds of recreation and health are narrowed and invaded by private greed, miscalled enterprise. When will true public spirit awake, and in the best interests of its age, and the generations of busy England yet unborn, protest and claim State protection in a matter that concerns the State only?

Rawnsley founded the Derwentwater and Borrowdale Defence Committee and enlisted the support of the Commons Preservation Society and the Kyrle Society, two established campaigning conservation organisations headed by well-known figures including Octavia and Miranda Hill, George Shaw Lefevre, James Bryce and Robert Hunter. The public paid heed, and protests became so widespread and so strong that the schemes were dropped. Griffiths writes that although by no means solely responsible for the successful outcome of the campaign, Rawnsley "became a local and national hero almost overnight, and a new awareness of landscape preservation came to the fore".

The success of the campaign led to the formation of the Lake District Defence Society (later to become The Friends of the Lake District). Rawnsley proposed the foundation of the organisation at a meeting of the Wordsworth Society in 1883. He maintained that for the sake of Wordsworth's literary heritage it was necessary to protect the landscape that had inspired him. The stated aim of the society was "to protect the Lake District from those injurious encroachments upon its scenery which are from time to time attempted from purely commercial or speculative motives, without regard to its claim as a national recreation ground". Besides Rawnsley, founder-members included Ruskin, Robert Browning, the Duke of Westminster and Alfred, Lord Tennyson, with whom Rawnsley had a family connection. (Note: The Tennysons were longstanding family friends of the Rawnsleys. Drummond's father, the Rev Thomas Hardwicke Rawnsley, was a friend and counsellor of Tennyson's father, and Drummond, the poet's lifelong friend, officiated at his wedding in Shiplake church in 1850.) As well as saving the landscape from insensitive development, Rawnsley and his colleagues aimed to protect rights of way and the use of common land. The new society gained support not only among local people but throughout Britain, including the cities; there was support from outside Britain, particularly from the United States.

=== Vicar of Crosthwaite ===
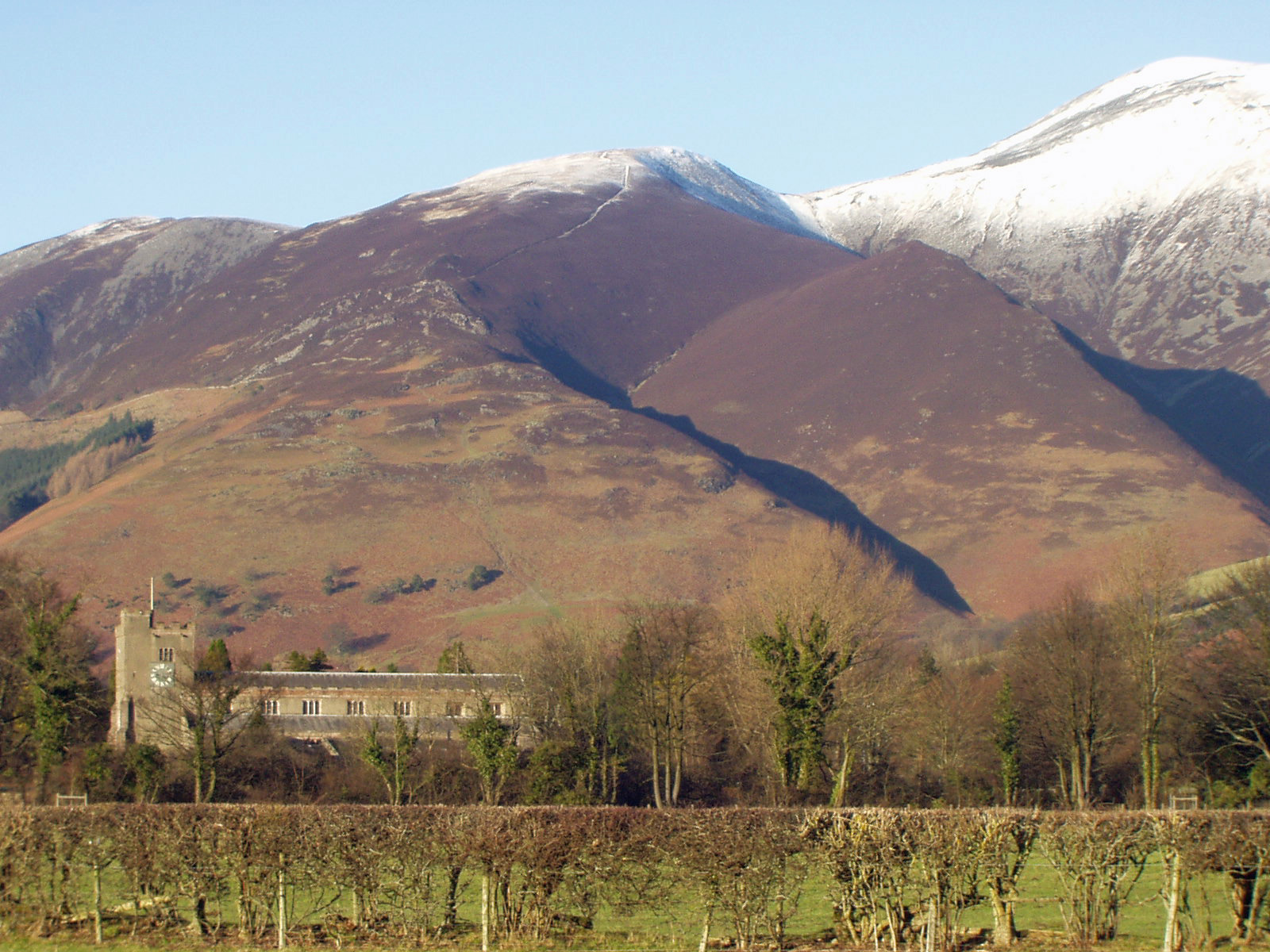
Crosthwaite, with St Kentigern's Church bottom left

During the time the Lake District Defence Society was being formed, the Bishop of Carlisle, Harvey Goodwin, offered Rawnsley the post of vicar of St Kentigern's Church, Crosthwaite and rural dean of Keswick. Goodwin said, "In my opinion the post which I offer you is as near Heaven as anything in this world can be". Rawnsley took up the appointment in July 1883.

By contrast with the tiny parish of Wray, which had a population of about 100, Crosthwaite was substantial, with not only St Kentigern's but five outlying churches in the surrounding countryside. The parish was founded in the sixth century, and there was much to appeal to Rawnsley's sense of history. He revived the traditional symbols of St Kentigern – a robin, a tree, a bell and a salmon with a ring in its mouth – incorporating them in the mosaic floor of the church. (Note: According to legend, Kentigern restored to life a decapitated robin, caused a tree to bear an everlasting harvest of blackberries, brought back from Rome a bell to call for prayers for the departed, and found a lost wedding ring in a fish, saving its royal owner from an accusation of infidelity against her. Kentigern is the patron saint of Glasgow, where he is more often given the name Mungo and his four symbols, depicted in the city's arms, are interpreted with slight variations from the Keswick version.) He threw himself vigorously into parish life, "friend to both landowner and boatman, tourist and local" in Griffiths's words. At the same time he continued to campaign on a large number of national issues, not only supporting conservation but opposing such practices as vivisection, rabbit coursing, the cruel trapping of animals, and what he called "murderous millinery" – the killing of birds to use their feathers in hats. "If there was a committee, he was on it; a church fete, he was opening it", commented Griffiths. One of his parishioners called him "the most active volcano in Europe". Both Murphy and Griffiths add that his reforming zeal sometimes made him "intolerably authoritarian"; his gardener referred to him as a "peppery old swine".

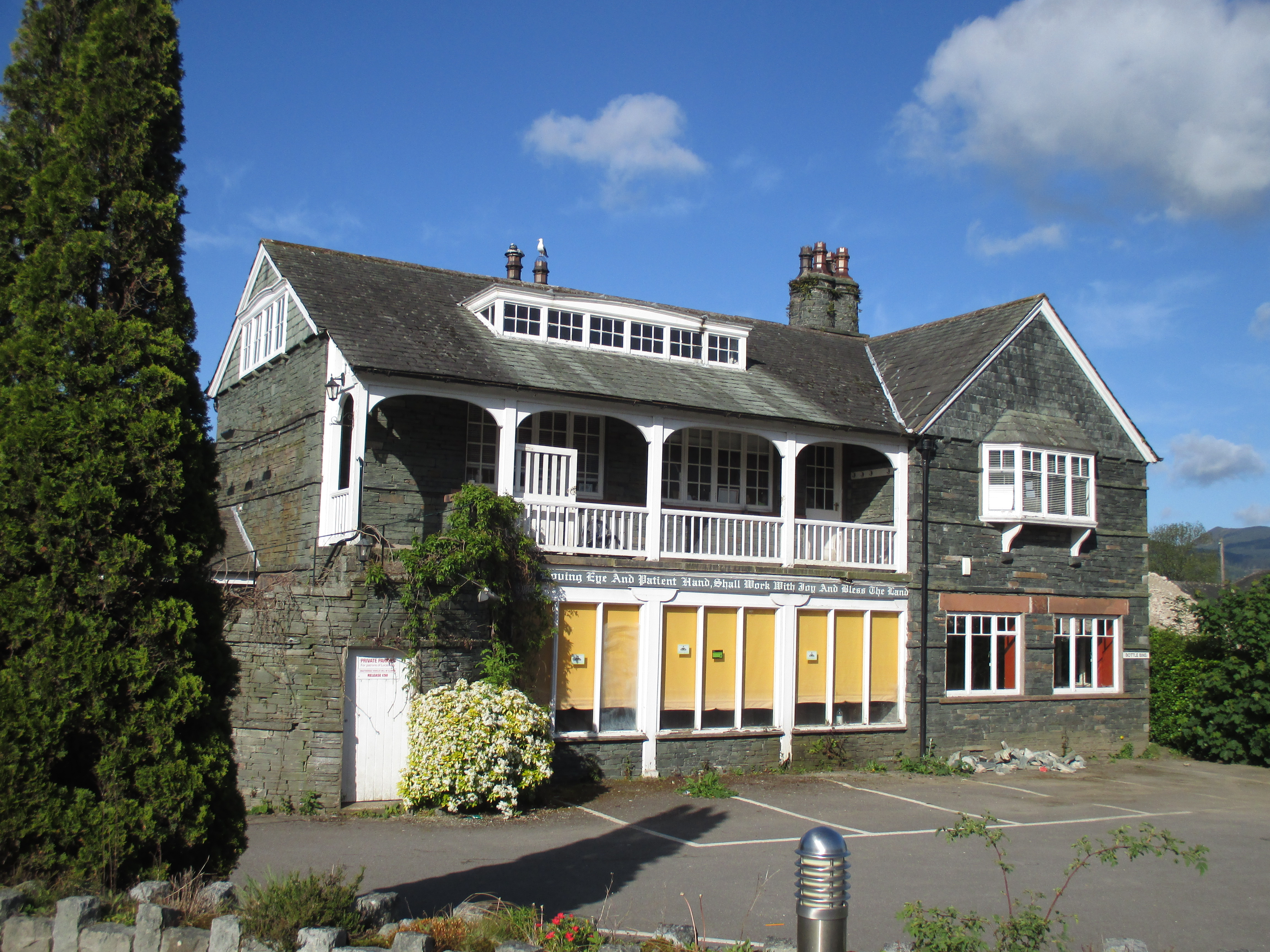
Home of the Keswick School of Industrial Art from 1894 to 1984

In November 1884 Rawnsley and his wife began organising classes in metalwork and wood carving. There was considerable unemployment in Keswick and the surrounding area, particularly in the winter months, and the Rawnsleys aimed to provide productive and satisfying work. Rawnsley was mindful of advice given to him by William Morris:

We must get the worker to delight in the use of his own hands and then to express his own natural desire for a thing to be shapely and harmonious in colours.

The classes, for men only, were held in the parish rooms near the centre of the town, under the supervision of Edith Rawnsley, assisted by a local designer and another professional from the South Kensington School of Design. This led to the establishment of the Keswick School of Industrial Art. It flourished and quickly gained a reputation for high-quality copper and silver decorative metalwork. By 1888 nearly seventy men were attending the classes. By 1890 the school was exhibiting nationally and winning prizes. To accommodate the increased numbers of students Rawnsley raised funds for a purpose-built home for the school, adjacent to the River Greta. It opened in 1894 and in 1898 a full-time head, Harold Stabler, was appointed, succeeded in 1900 by Herbert Maryon. The school was mainly financed from sales of its products, and continued in operation until 1984. For the women of Keswick and the district the Rawnsleys introduced spinning and weaving classes, led by Marion Twelves, a protégée of Ruskin. Rawnsley was proud that when Ruskin died in 1900, the pall for the coffin was handspun and handwoven in Keswick under Twelves's direction.

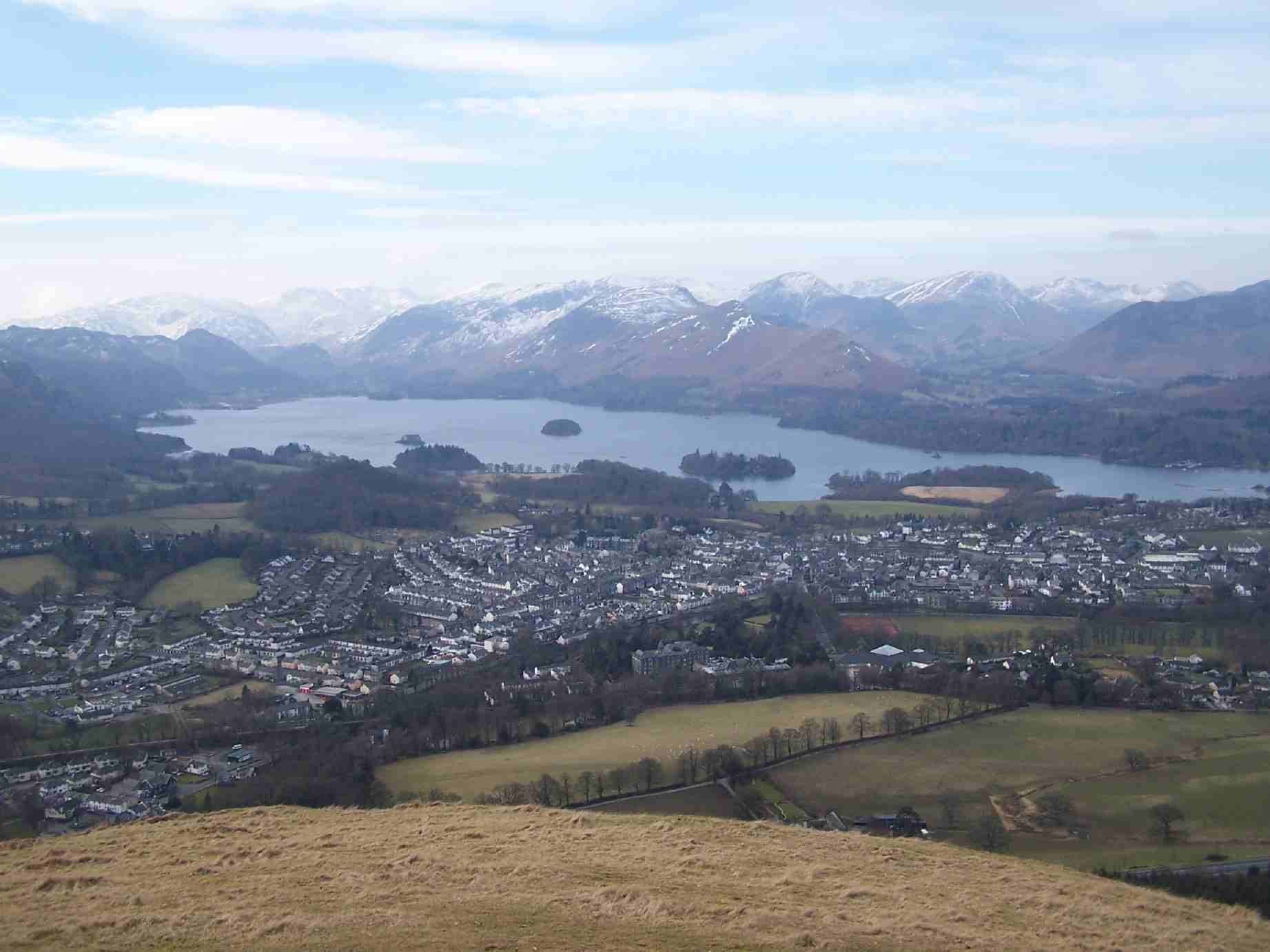
The view from the top of Latrigg

In 1887 Rawnsley revived the moribund Keswick and District Footpath Preservation Society, with the principal aim of stopping landowners blocking public rights of way across their land. The owner of Fawe Park, Portinscale, had done so between the Derwentwater shore and the slopes of Catbells. When persuasion failed, Rawnsley led hundreds of demonstrators to demolish the barriers. Bott comments that this dispute roused local passions, but that the next confrontation between Rawnsley and local landowners earned national headlines. The owner of Latrigg, a fell overlooking Keswick, attempted to block access along two paths and challenged the objectors to trespass, with a view to bringing a test case in court. The barriers were torn down and more than 2,000 people marched to the Latrigg summit. The case came to trial and a compromise was reached: one path remained closed but the other was recognised as an inalienable public right of way.

In addition to his post at Crosthwaite, Rawnsley was appointed as an honorary canon of Carlisle Cathedral in 1891. Within his parish, his interest in education led him to take a large part in founding Keswick High School, one of the first co-educational secondary schools in the country, which opened in October 1898. He was chairman of the school's board of governors, and Cumberland's director of education described him as "the real founder of the Keswick High School". To Rawnsley, education was not merely about the basic "three Rs"; it had to also incorporate culture, art, awareness of nature and responsibility to all living things.

=== County Councillor ===
Of the three people who later founded the National Trust, Rawnsley was the only one who associated himself even loosely with a party political movement. Robert Hunter, as a civil servant, was not permitted to do so and Octavia Hill was wary of governments and parties in general. There were two main British parties at the time: the Conservatives, seen as defending the interests of the landed aristocracy, and the Liberals, generally more sympathetic to ideas about environmental protection and public access to the countryside. When English local government was reorganised in the late 1880s Rawnsley stood as an independent Liberal for the newly formed Cumberland County Council in January 1889. He was elected as the member for Keswick. (Note: Rawnsley's majority was fairly narrow. He polled 236 votes to the runner-up's 209.)

Rawnsley, early 1890s

Rawnsley became chairman of the council's Highways Committee. He stood out against the construction of roads over lakeland passes, secured controls over mining pollution, and promoted adequate signposting of footpaths. As a councillor he was continually at odds with the brewing industry. He hated drunkenness, and opposed what he saw as excessive numbers of public houses and unduly lax alcohol licensing regulations but he was never a prohibitionist: after returning from a tour of French vineyards he wrote to The Times protesting against Britain's high tax on the importation of French wine, which he saw as unfair and as contributing to rural poverty in France.

Ruskin's emphasis on practical skills was a lifelong influence on Rawnsley, and as a county councillor he promoted a mobile dairy hygiene unit. Its horse-drawn dairies toured the farms and villages, showing how to produce butter and cheese to the highest standards. Griffiths comments that it not only improved life for local farm workers but also led to increased competition against Danish dairy imports. This initiative developed into the Newton Rigg Farm School, near Penrith, which opened in 1896 and (at 2020) continues as Newton Rigg College. Rawnsley was also instrumental in founding a sanatorium for tuberculosis patients on Blencathra, 900 ft (275m) above sea level, where the mountain air was believed to be beneficial. His concern for the health of the community prompted him to campaign against over-processed white bread, encourage fell running and above all strive to ensure that footpaths were kept open to allow walking. He lost his seat on the council in 1895, the vote probably tipped by objections to his firm stance on public houses and alcohol licensing.

=== National Trust ===
During the last two years the top of Snowdon, the island in the middle of Grasmere lake, and the Lodore Falls have all come into the market. Had such a Trust as that now proposed been in existence, each of these places might have been obtained for the nation.

— H. D. Rawnsley, 1894

By 1890 Rawnsley had become convinced that the surest means of protecting land for public enjoyment was not lobbying or legislation but ownership. There had been cases in which people wished to give or bequeath property to the public, but there was no suitable national body that was legally capable of owning it. In 1884 Hunter had proposed "the formation of a corporate company" to hold properties "with a view to the protection of the public interest in the open spaces of the country". Hill was in favour of the idea but the Commons Preservation Society was against it, fearing that such a body would compete with it for public support; the proposal was allowed to lapse. In 1893 several important properties in the Lake District came up for sale, and Rawnsley went to London to discuss with Hunter and Hill how the sites might be acquired for the public. They agreed to revive the proposal of a national trust. An inaugural meeting was convened at Grosvenor House, London, in July 1894; Hunter and Rawnsley were elected chairman and secretary respectively. The National Trust for Places of Historic Interest or Natural Beauty formally came into being in January 1895.

Until his death, Rawnsley worked as honorary secretary to the Trust. He was responsible for the campaign to raise the £6,500 needed to buy Brandlehow Woods and Fell, a 105-acre property, the National Trust's first purchase in the Lake District. He was at the forefront of successful efforts to buy other properties in Cumberland and Westmorland: the 750 acre Gowbarrow Fell at Ullswater (1906); a large tract at the southern end of Derwentwater 1908, including a wooded knoll given by the Rawnsleys to mark their 25th year in the district (1908); extensive holdings in Borrowdale including the Bowder Stone (1910); and the site of the Castlerigg stone circle (1913). He was active elsewhere in the country on the National Trust's behalf. By the time of his death in 1920 the trust held 994 estates throughout England and Wales, including Waggoners Wells, Hampshire, acquired in memory of Hunter and Hydon's Ball, Surrey, in memory of Hill.

=== Later years ===
Rawnsley was a frequent traveller. He and his wife made several walking and painting tours in the Alps, visited the Holy Land and went to Egypt when their son was working there in Sir Flinders Petrie's archaeological team. Rawnsley published accounts of his trips and books of poetry inspired by them. (Note: Notes for the Nile (1892); Idylls and Lyrics of the Nile (1894); Sonnets in Switzerland and Italy (1899); Flower-time in the Oberland (1904); and The Resurrection of the Oldest Egypt (1904).) In 1896 he went to Russia as a newspaper correspondent to cover the coronation of Nicholas II, and three years later he toured the eastern states of the United States as ambassador for the National Trust.

After the launch of the National Trust, Rawnsley continued to campaign on other issues about which he felt strongly. He took a leading role in the erection of monuments to Wordsworth (Cockermouth, 1896), Caedmon (Whitby, 1896) and Bede (Monkwearmouth, 1903). He turned his attention to the cinema, where he was strongly against the depiction of sex and violence. His loathing of indecency extended to an aversion to saucy seaside postcards. He encouraged young people not to attend "lurid crime films at kinemas", and turn instead to wholesome organisations such as the YMCA, Boy Scouts and Girl Guides.

In 1898 Rawnsley was offered the bishopric of Madagascar, but declined it, feeling himself committed to his conservation work in the Lake District and, by then, in many other parts of the British countryside. In 1909 he was appointed a residentiary canon of Carlisle Cathedral, and spent three months a year staying in the Cathedral Close.

Portinscale bridge, 1913

A local controversy in 1911 made national news, when Rawnsley and Hunter successfully opposed the county council's proposal to demolish the medieval Portinscale bridge across the River Derwent near St Kentigern's and replace it with a modern structure. Proponents of a new bridge maintained that antiquity alone did not justify retaining an old structure: it must, they contended, have "historic associations". This argument was widely ridiculed and the council backed down, outmanoeuvred by Rawnsley, who, together with the owner of the adjacent property, offered to underwrite the cost of strengthening the old bridge. (Note: The old bridge survived for another 43 years, until it was damaged beyond repair by floods in December 1954.)

In 1912 Rawnsley was appointed to the honorary position of chaplain to the king, and he held the post of chaplain to the Border Regiment of the Territorial Force, with the rank of colonel. When the First World War began in 1914 Rawnsley's views were straightforward: "The German envy and hate, which has been nursed against us secretly for the last 30 years, is now seen in all its open madness. It is the blackest and most devilish thing that has been heard of in history". He urged the young men of Cumberland to fight "for home and Empire". Among the volunteers was his son, Noel, who survived the war. Rawnsley's confidence was shaken as the war went on and the lists of casualties grew longer and longer. When the war ended he was at the forefront of organising the peace celebrations.

In 1915, with a view to eventual retirement, Rawnsley bought Allan Bank, Grasmere, a house in which Wordsworth had lived between 1808 and 1811. While he was staying at Carlisle in December 1916 his wife died at Crosthwaite from cardiac arrest brought on by influenza. Rawnsley, who had also caught influenza, was too ill to attend her funeral. In his absence the service was led by the Bishop of Barrow-in-Furness, Campbell West-Watson.

Rawnsley felt unable to carry on without Edith's help, and the week after Easter 1917 he resigned from St Kentigern's after 34 years and retired to Allan Bank. He continued his work for the National Trust and remained an active Canon of Carlisle. In 1918 he married Eleanor "Nellie" Foster Simpson, a long-standing friend to him and Edith, who had for some years been his secretary. After the marriage the couple's honeymoon consisted of a tour of National Trust properties in Wales, a trip that was the basis of Rawnsley's last book, a study of thirteen of the trust's properties in Wales and the West Country.

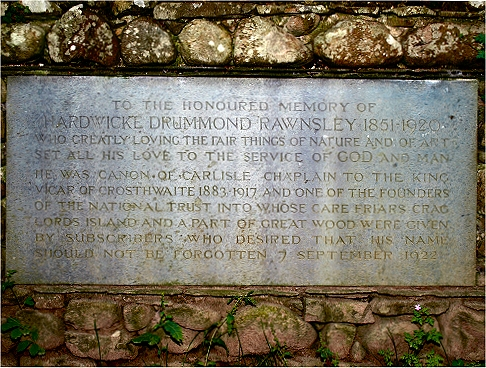
Memorial to Rawnsley at Friar's Crag, Keswick

Rawnsley suffered a heart attack and died at Allan Bank on 28 May 1920, after a brief illness. He was buried in the churchyard of St Kentigern's alongside Edith. He bequeathed Allan Bank to the National Trust, with a lifetime lease to Eleanor, who lived there until her death in 1959.

== Legacy ==
In its obituary notice, The Times wrote that "It is no exaggeration to say – and it is much to say of anyone – that England would be a much duller and less healthy and happy country if [Rawnsley] had not lived and worked." To commemorate him, the National Trust raised funds soon after his death to buy Friars' Crag, Lord's Island and other land bordering Derwentwater. A memorial stone is set in the wall alongside the path from the Keswick landing stages to the end of Friars' Crag. Eleanor Rawnsley wrote a biography of her husband, published by his regular publisher, MacLehose, in 1923.

Rawnsley published more than forty books, some on religious subjects, many with a Lake District theme, and, as the Oxford Dictionary of National Biography put it, "as a minor lake poet, a vast output of verse." His memoir of Ruskin (1901) was described by The New York Times as "in many ways the best volume [of] his series of books upon some of the literary aspects of the Lake Country".

=== Books by Rawnsley ===
- Bristol Sonnets. Bristol: Hamilton, Adams. 1877. OCLC 61607926.
- Sonnets at the English Lakes. London: Longmans Green. 1881. OCLC 4008060.
- The Proposed Permanent Lake District Defence Society. Location unidentified: Cumberland Association for the Advancement of Literature and Science. 1883. OCLC 644138522.
- Christ For To-Day : International Sermons. London: Swan Sonnenschein. 1885. OCLC 6653163.
- Sonnets Round the Coast. London: Swan Sonnenschein. 1887. OCLC 6548873.
- A Coach Drive at the Lakes. London: Smith, Elder. 1888. OCLC 173298975.
- Edward Thring Teacher and Poet. London: Fisher Unwin. 1889. OCLC 504580484.
- Five Addresses on the Lives and Work of St Kentigern and St Herbert: Delivered in St Kentigern's Church, Crosthwaite. Carlisle: Thurnam. 1889. OCLC 2522148.
- Poems, Ballads, and Bucolics. London and New York: Macmillan. 1890. OCLC 11339374.
- Notes for the Nile: Together With a Metrical Rendering of the Hymns of Ancient Egypt and of the Precepts of Ptah-Hotep. London: Heinemann. 1892. OCLC 470045030.
- Valete: Tennyson and other memorial poems. Glasgow: MacLehose. 1893. OCLC 963587042.
- Idylls and Lyrics of the Nile. London: Nutt. 1894. OCLC 3192003.
- Literary Associations of English Lakes. Glasgow: MacLehose. 1894. OCLC 23309467.
- Harvey Goodwin Bishop of Carlisle: A Biographical Memoir. London: John Murray. 1896. OCLC 20378714.
- The Darkened West: An Appeal to England for Armenia. Keswick: Bakewell. 1896. OCLC 28107603.
- Ballads of Brave Deeds. London: Dent. 1896. OCLC 9725182.
- The Revival of the Decorative Arts at Lucerne. Lucerne: Official General Enquiry Office. 1896. OCLC 504580795.
- The Sayings of Jesus: Six Village Sermons on a Papyrus Fragment Preached in St Kentigern's Church, Crosthwaite, Keswick. Glasgow: MacLehose. 1897. OCLC 43141875.
- Henry Whitehead, 1825–1896: A Memorial Sketch. Glasgow: MacLehose. 1898. OCLC 20682779.
- Life and Nature at the English Lakes. Glasgow: MacLehose. 1899. OCLC 3716517.
- Sonnets in Switzerland and Italy. London: Dent. 1899. OCLC 60224088.
- Ballads of the War. London: Dent. 1900. OCLC 1118208561.
- Memories of the Tennysons. Glasgow: Glasgow University Press. 1900. OCLC 247169898.
- Ruskin and the English Lakes. Glasgow: MacLehose. 1901. OCLC 1122786.
- A Rambler's Note-book at the Lakes. Glasgow: MacLehose. 1902. OCLC 62438846.
- The Story of Gough and his Dog on Helvellyn. Carlisle: Coward. 1902. OCLC 40210593.
- Lake Country Sketches. Glasgow: MacLehose. 1903. OCLC 399981.
- Flower-time in the Oberland. Glasgow: MacLehose. 1904. OCLC 1117898320.
- The Resurrection of the Oldest Egypt: Being the Story of Abydos as Told by the Discoveries of Dr. Petrie. Laleham, Middlesex: Beaver Press. 1904. OCLC 700087805.
- Sacrum Commercium: The Converse of Francis and his Sons with Holy Poverty. London: Dent. 1904. OCLC 782244674. (by Giovanni Parenti, translated and edited by Rawnsley)
- The Venerable Bede: His Life and Work. Sunderland: Hills. 1904. OCLC 6001065.
- Months at the English Lakes. Glasgow: MacLehose. 1906. OCLC 5590213.
- A Sonnet Chronicle 1900–1906. Glasgow: MacLehose. 1906. OCLC 13312642.
- Round the Lake Country. Glasgow: MacLehose. 1909. OCLC 835758964.
- Poems at Home and Abroad. Glasgow: MacLehose. 1909. OCLC 4542815.
- By Fell and Dale at the English Lakes. Glasgow: MacLehose. 1911. OCLC 319508.
- The Book of Coronation Bonfires. Carlisle: Thurnham. 1911. OCLC 314511792.
- Chapters at the English Lakes. Glasgow: MacLehose. 1913. OCLC 399983.
- The European War: Poems. London: Bennett. 1915. OCLC 504580518.
- Past and Present at the English Lakes. Glasgow: MacLehose. 1916. OCLC 319514.
- A Nation's Heritage. London: Allen and Unwin. 1920. OCLC 682274987.

== Notes, references and sources ==
=== Sources ===
==== Books ====
- Albritton, Vicky; Fredrik Albritton Jonsson (7 March 2016). Green Victorians: The Simple Life in John Ruskin's Lake District. Chicago: University of Chicago Press. ISBN 978-0-226-33998-6.
- Bott, George (1994). Keswick – The Story of a Lake District Town. Carlisle: Cumbria County Library. ISBN 978-0-905404-51-6.
- Cowell, Ben (2016). "For the Benefit of the Nation: Politics and the Early National Trust". In Elizabeth Baigent; Ben Cowell (eds.). Octavia Hill, Social Activism and the Remaking of British Society. London: University of London, Institute of Historical Research. pp. 295–316. ISBN 978-1-909646-58-2. JSTOR j.ctv4w3whm.21.
- Grant, Susan (2006). The Story of the Newlands Valley. Carlisle: Bookcase. ISBN 978-1-904147-17-6.
- Griffiths, Vivian (2020). "Canon Hardwicke Rawnsley". The Three Founders of the National Trust. London: Pitkin. ISBN 978-1-84165-898-8.
- Harbour, William (1982). The Foundations of Conservative Thought. Notre Dame, Indiana: University of Notre Dame Press. ISBN 978-0-268-00959-5.
- Mackenzie, Donald Alexander (1996). Ancient Man in Britain. London: Senate. ISBN 978-1-930841-28-4.
- Murphy, Graham (2002). Founders of the National Trust. London: National Trust. ISBN 978-0-7078-0332-6.
- Rawnsley, Eleanor (1923). Canon Rawnsley: An Account of his Life. Glasgow: MacLehose. OCLC 8213081.
- Rawnsley, Hardwicke (1901). Ruskin and the English Lakes. Glasgow: MacLehose. OCLC 1069573733.
- Rice, H. A. L. (1967). Lake Country Portraits. London: Harvill Press. OCLC 491850880.
- Richardson, Nigel (2014). Thring of Uppingham: Victorian Educator. Buckingham: University of Buckingham Press. ISBN 978-1-908684-05-9.
- Ricks, Christopher (1989). Tennyson (second ed.). Berkeley: University of California Press. ISBN 978-0-520-06784-4.
- Welsh, Frank (1997). The Companion Guide to The Lake District. Woodbridge, Suffolk and Rochester, NY: Companion Guides. ISBN 978-1-900639-23-1.

==== Journals ====
- Ranlett, John (Winter 1983). "'Checking Nature's Desecration': Late-Victorian Environmental Organization". Victorian Studies. 26 (2): 197–222. JSTOR 3827006. (subscription required)
