= Henry Frankland =

East India Company administrator (1690–1738)

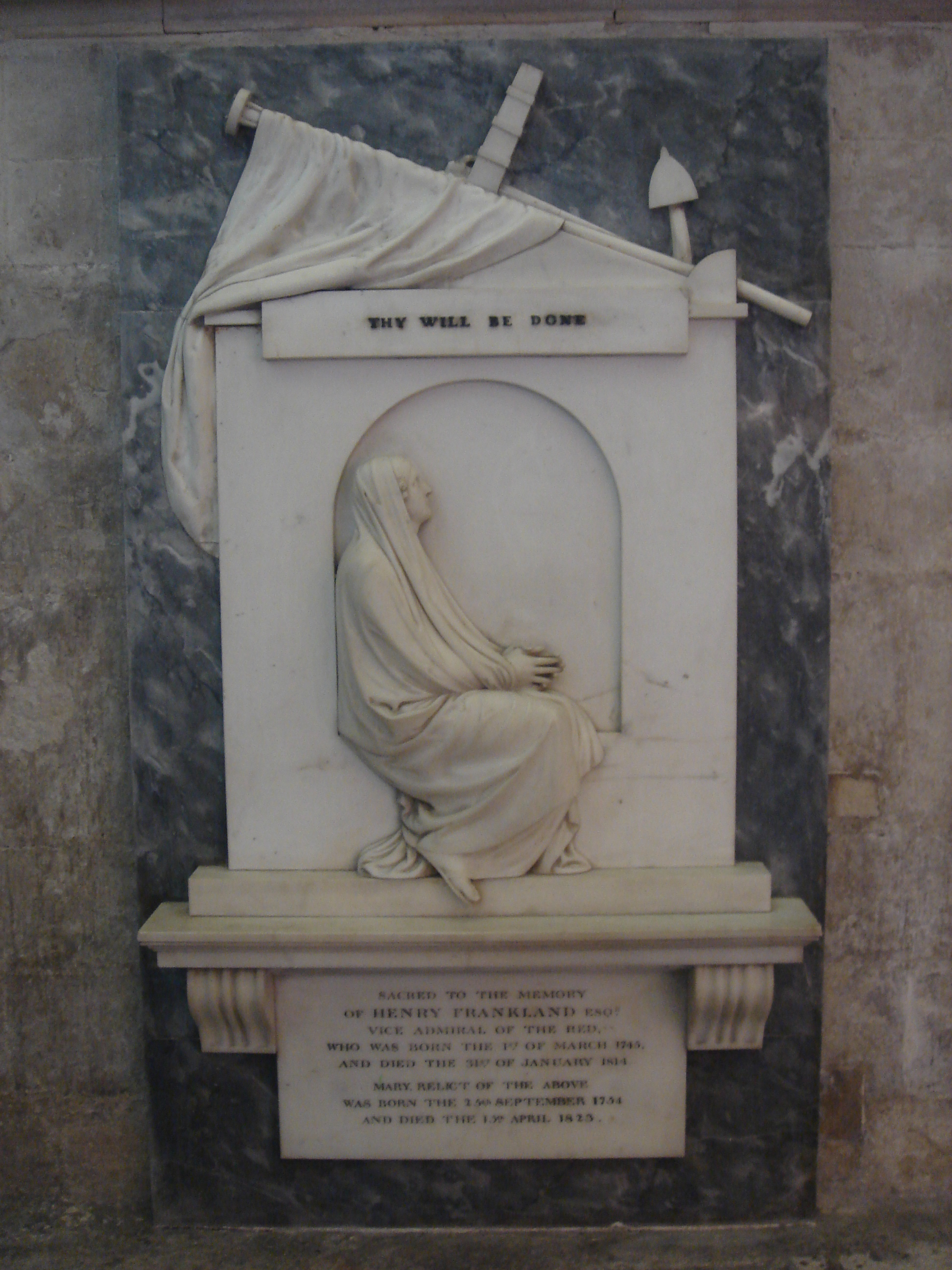
- Memorial in Chichester Cathedral to a descendant of Henry Frankland
- Born: 1690
- Died: 1738 (aged 47–48)
- Occupation: Colonial Administrator
- Known for: President of Bengal

Henry Frankland (1690–1738) was an administrator of the British East India Company.

Frankland served as President of Bengal in the eighteenth century. He was a younger son of Sir Thomas Frankland, 2nd Baronet and Elizabeth Russell (through whom Frankland was a descendant of Oliver Cromwell) and was the father of Sir Charles Frankland, 4th Baronet, and Sir Thomas Frankland, 5th Baronet.

Political offices
Preceded by John Deane	President of Bengal; 30 January 1726 – 17 September 1728	Succeeded by Edward Stephenson
