= Willingham Franklin Rawnsley =

Willingham Franklin Rawnsley (1845?–1927) was a British author and the proprietor of a private school.

He was the oldest of ten children of the Rev. Drummond Rawnsley, rector of Halton Holgate in Lincolnshire, England, and Catherine Ann (Franklin) Rawnsley. The Arctic explorer John Franklin was his great-uncle, and as a child he served as a page at Alfred, Lord Tennyson's wedding. His younger brother Hardwicke became a Church of England clergyman and a founder of the National Trust.

Rawnsley was educated at Christ Church and Corpus Christi Colleges at Oxford University, where he took honours in Classics. In 1880, he married Alice Argles, daughter of Marsham Argles of Peterborough.

Rawnsley went on to become the proprietor of Winton House in Winchester, a private school for boys. After retiring, he moved to Guildford in Surrey, where he worked on helping the National Trust acquire properties.

Rawnsley wrote several books, including Early Days at Uppingham under Edward Thring (1904), Introductions to the Poets (1912), Highways and Byways of Lincolnshire, (1914), and The Life, Diaries, and Correspondence of Jane Lady Franklin (1926). He also edited Mary Louisa Armitt's posthumously published books of local history The Church of Grasmere: A History (1912) and Rydal (1916).

Rawnsley donated some of the documents in the Franklin archive at the Royal Society of Tasmania.

Rawnsley died on 18 February 1927.
