= Portinscale =

Village in Cumbria, England

Coordinates: 54.603022°N 3.163204°W

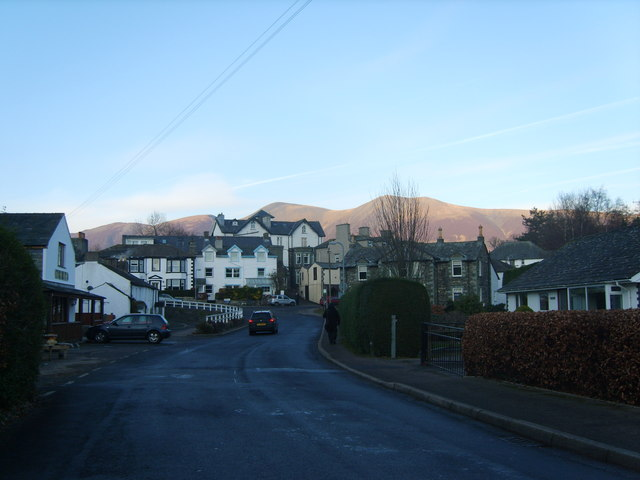
- Portinscale

- Location in Allerdale, Cumbria Location within Cumbria
- OS grid reference: NY248237
- Unitary authority: Cumberland
- Ceremonial county: Cumbria
- Region: North West
- Country: England
- Sovereign state: United Kingdom
- Post town: KESWICK
- Postcode district: CA12
- Dialling code: 017687
- Police: Cumbria
- Fire: Cumbria
- Ambulance: North West
- UK Parliament: Penrith and Solway

Portinscale is a village in Cumbria, England, close to the western shore of Derwentwater in the Lake District National Park 1 1/2 miles (2.5 kilometres) from Keswick.

For administrative purposes, Portinscale lies within the civil parish of Above Derwent, the unitary authority of Cumberland, and the ceremonial county of Cumbria. It is within the Penrith and Solway constituency of the United Kingdom Parliament. The village covers approximately 100 acres (40 hectares). At the 2011 census the population was 560.

The name of the village means "the harlot's hut", deriving from the Old English "portcwene" (harlot) and Old Norse "skáli" (hut). (Note: In the centre of the village is an old lane officially called "Finkle Street": some authorities connect the word "Finkle" with prostitution, although others suggest it means "with a bend", which Portinscale's Finkle Street, seen above, has.) The scholar Eilert Ekwall cites an undated early spelling of the name as "Portquenscale".

== History ==
The antiquary W. G. Collingwood, commenting on an archaeological find at Portinscale, wrote that it showed that "Stone Age man was fairly at home in the Lake District". The remains of the workshop of a prehistoric tool-maker were discovered in 1901 by workmen digging out a fish-pond near the village, about 150 yards (140 metres) from the north-west shore of Derwentwater. A later find was a mould dating from about 1400, used to make crucifixes for the use of religious pilgrims. Hardwicke Rawnsley, co-founder of the National Trust and vicar of Portinscale's parish church, Crosthwaite, theorised that the mouldings were sold to people en route to St Herbert's Island from Nichol End, Portinscale's embarkation point on Derwentwater. From medieval times until the twentieth century, according to records at Carlisle Castle, a Court leet met periodically and appointed constables for Portinscale. In the seventeenth century the village was a centre of Quakerism, and for preaching without a licence several local Quakers suffered the prescribed penalty, "ye Spoiling of their goods and imprisonment of their bodys." During the Second World War the British army's infantry driving and maintenance school was based in Portinscale.

Old Portinscale Bridge, c. 1880

The main road from Keswick to Cockermouth ran through Portinscale until a bypass was built in the 1960s. In 1911 there was controversy about the county council's proposal to demolish the medieval bridge carrying the road across the River Derwent and replace it with a modern structure. There had been a stone bridge on the site since c. 1210–16, although the date of the structure under threat in 1911 is unknown. The bridge, properly called "the Long Bridge", was unusual in having two arches; on the great coach road from Kendal to Cockermouth all but two of the other bridges crossed their rivers in a single span. (Note: The other two were Troutbeck Bridge and Greta Bridge in Keswick; all three have been demolished, although the replacement Greta Bridge (1926) is again a two-arch structure.) Rawnsley and Sir Robert Hunter of the National Trust led the opposition to the council's proposal. They were supported by The Times, The Manchester Guardian and the Royal Automobile Club, and the proposal was dropped. The old bridge survived for another 43 years, until it was damaged beyond repair by floods in December 1954. A temporary metal girder Callender-Hamilton bridge was placed across the river, to carry alternating one-way traffic, and a new permanent bridge was built 400 yards (370 m) downstream, allowing the diversion of the main road to by-pass the village. After the new road bridge was opened, the temporary metal structure was replaced by a new pedestrian bridge on the old site, allowing foot traffic between Portinscale and Keswick on the path across the fields known as the Howrahs. (Note: The name dates back to the 18th century; the historian J W Kaye links it to the landowner, Edward Stephenson, who retired to his native Keswick having been an important figure in the East India Company. Stephenson was based in Calcutta of which Howrah was a suburb.)

== Features and attractions ==
The village hall was opened on 10 October 1925. The village has one pub, the Farmer's Arms; a restaurant, the Chalet; a café, the Dandelion; the Derwent Water Marina; numerous bed-and-breakfast establishments; and a substantial and long-established hotel, the Derwentwater, originally called the Black Dog, and then from about 1815 the Marshal Blücher. In 1847 the authors of a guide to Cumberland wrote, "The Blücher hotel occupies a delightful situation in the village … attached to it are neat public gardens, or pleasure grounds, and there is an interesting aviary, in which, amongst several other valuable birds are two golden eagles, – perhaps the only birds of the kind in the north of England."

Next to the hotel is Derwent Hill Outdoor Education and Training Centre. It has been owned by Sunderland City Council since 1962, and is a residential centre offering courses for children and young people, leadership and management training, conference facilities and group accommodation.

On the edge of Portinscale is Derwent Bank, a large house built as "Finkle Street House" in 1785; since 1937 it has been a centre for walking holidays. Just outside the village are two large country houses designed by Alfred Waterhouse: Fawe Park, built in 1858, and Lingholm, built in the 1870s. The former is close to the Nichol End stop of the Keswick Launch Company's Derwentwater ferry service.

== Gallery ==
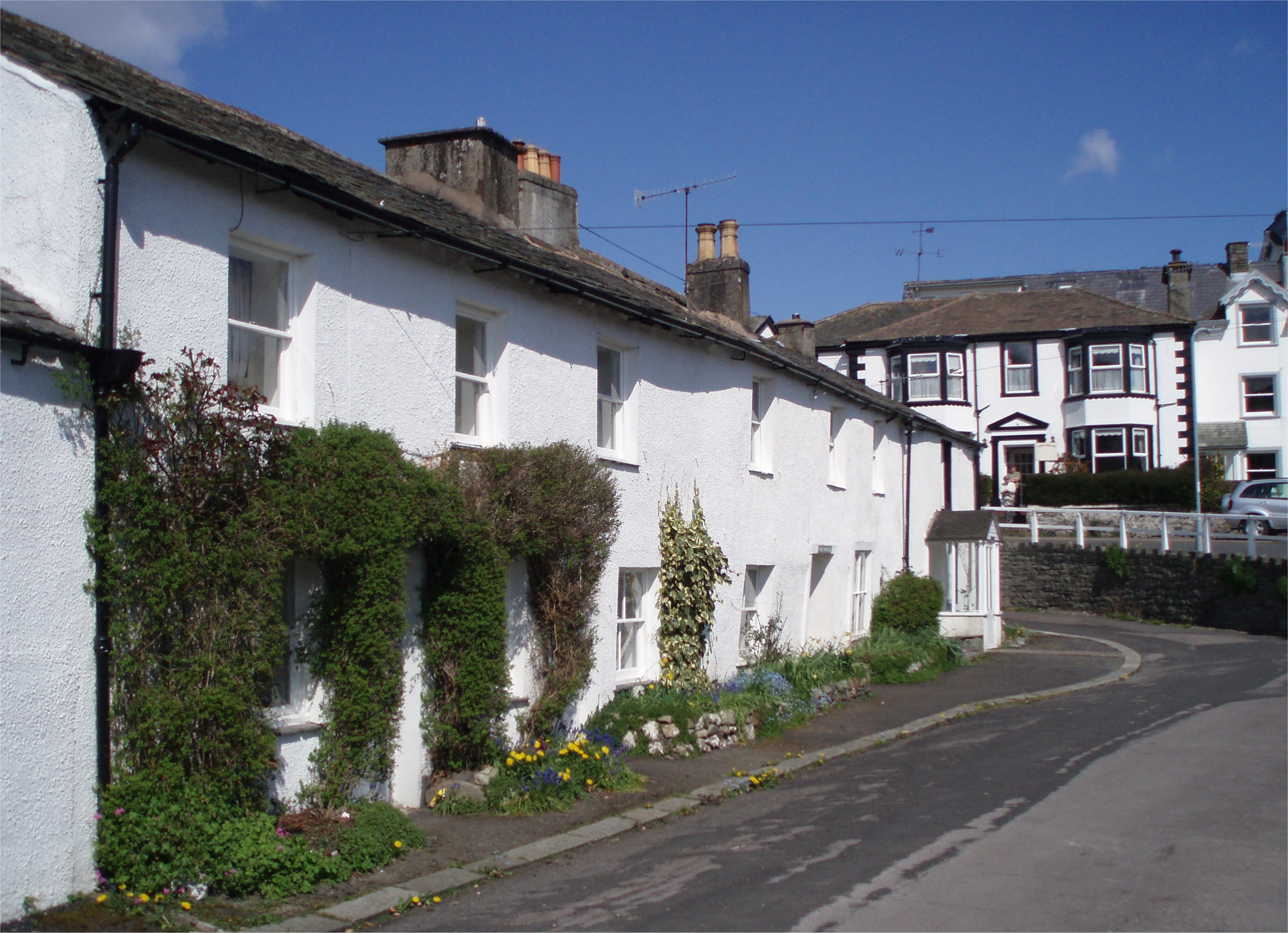
Finkle Street in the centre of Portinscale

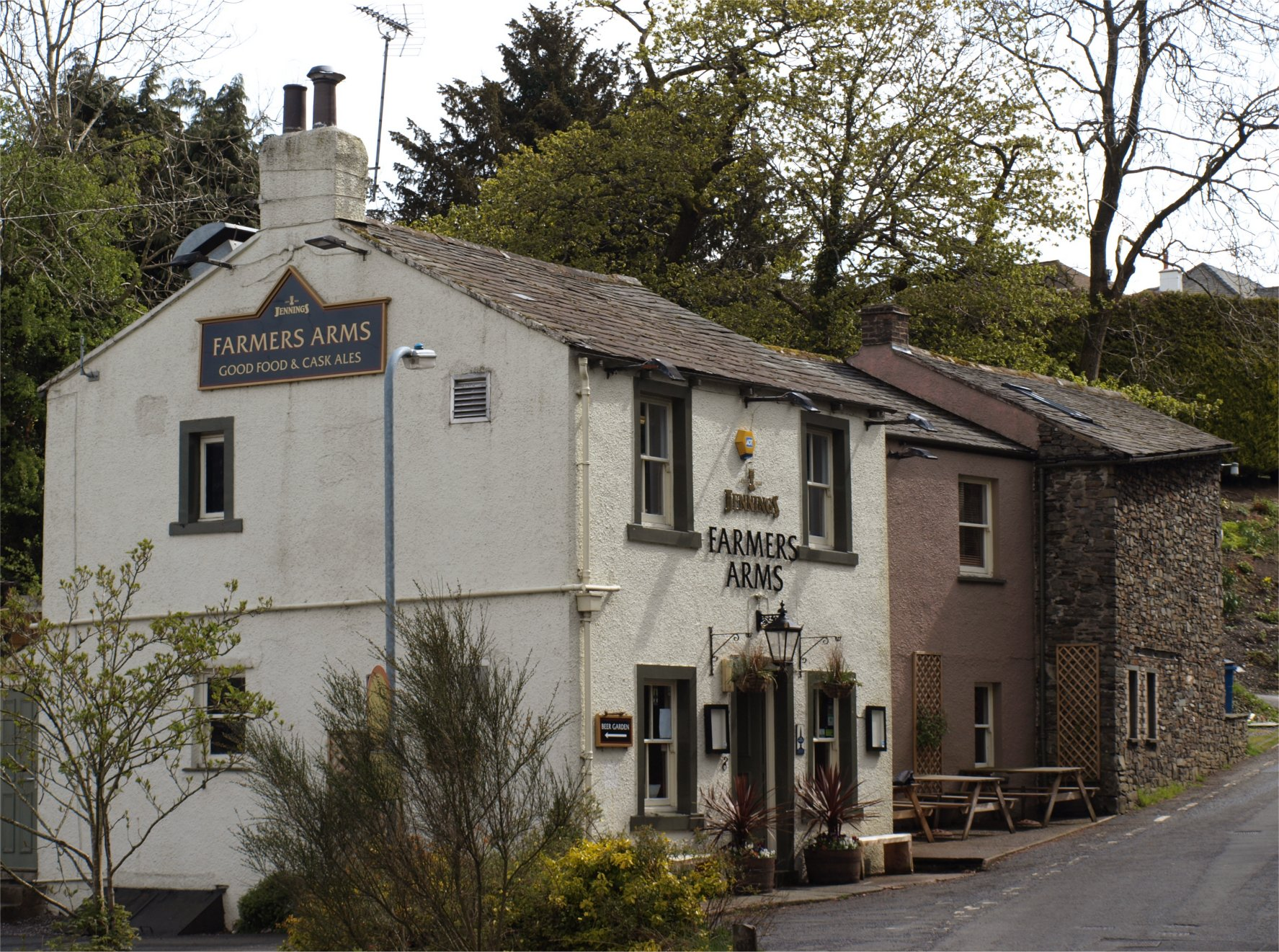
Portinscale village pub
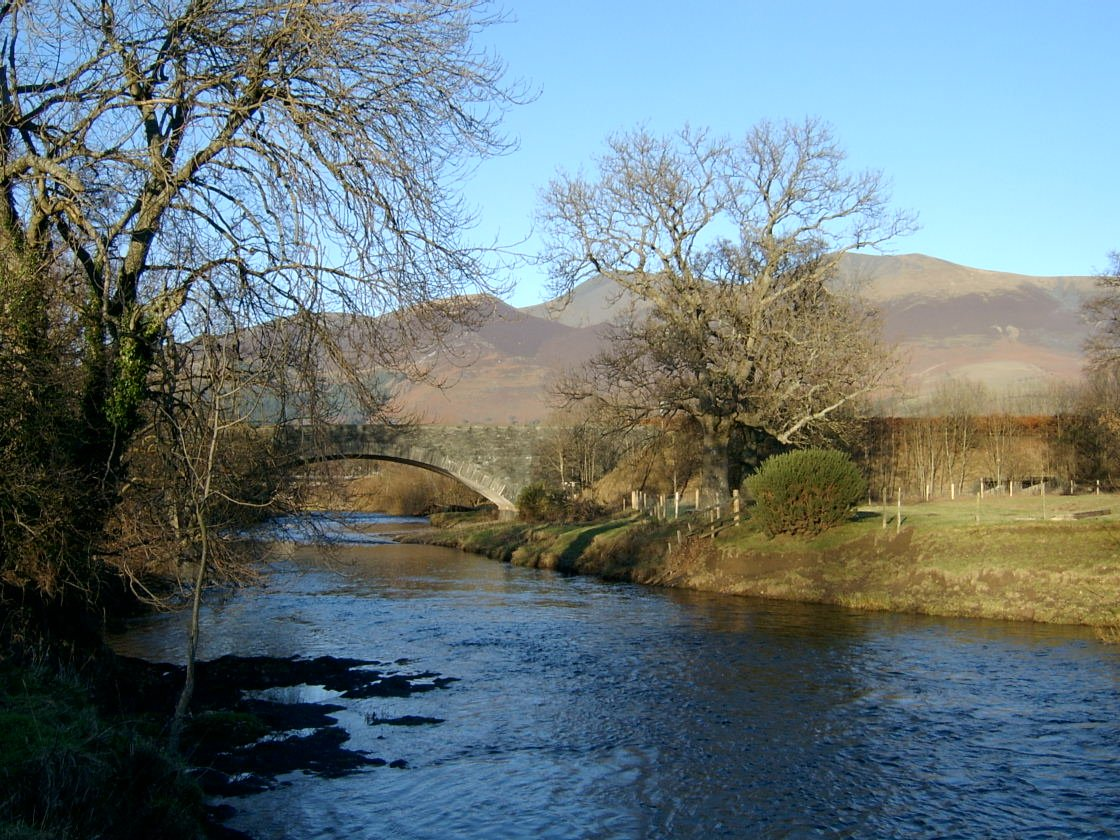
New road bridge

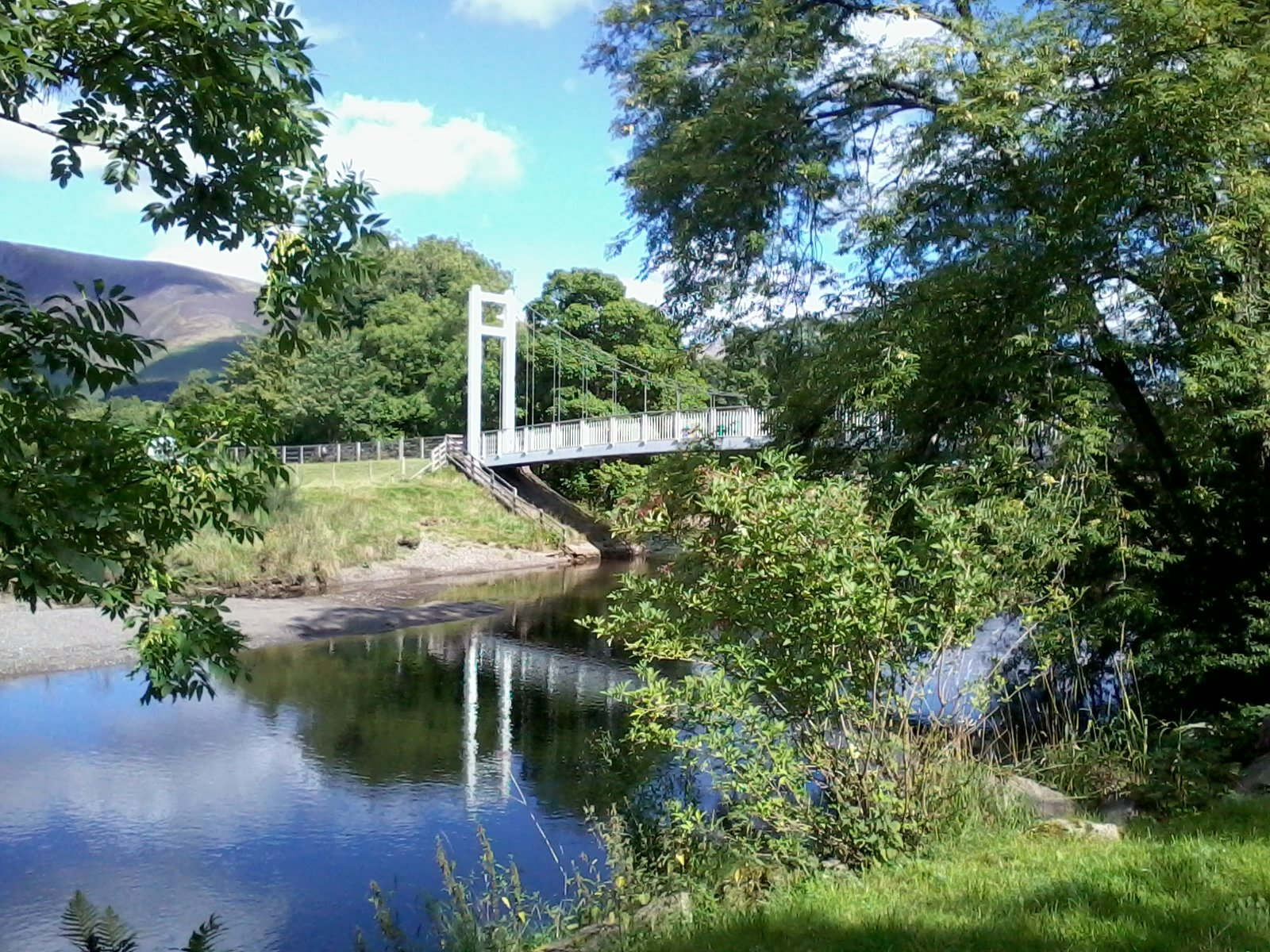
New footbridge on site of old road bridge

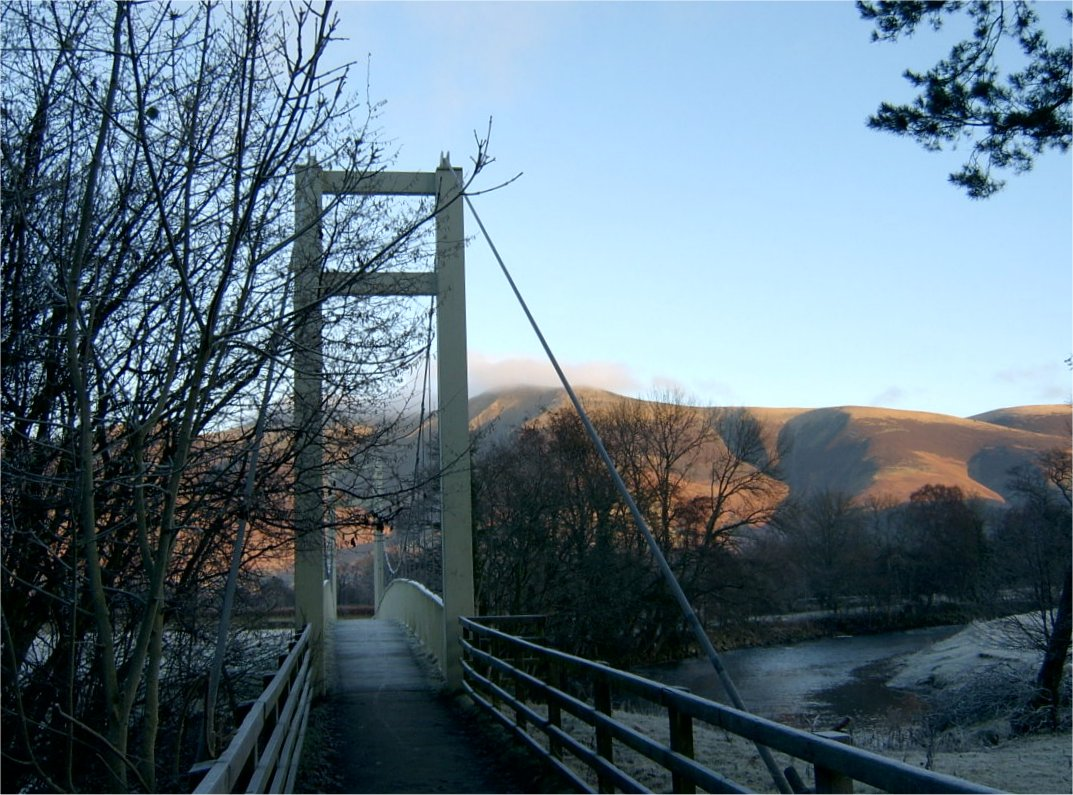
Entrance to new footbridge
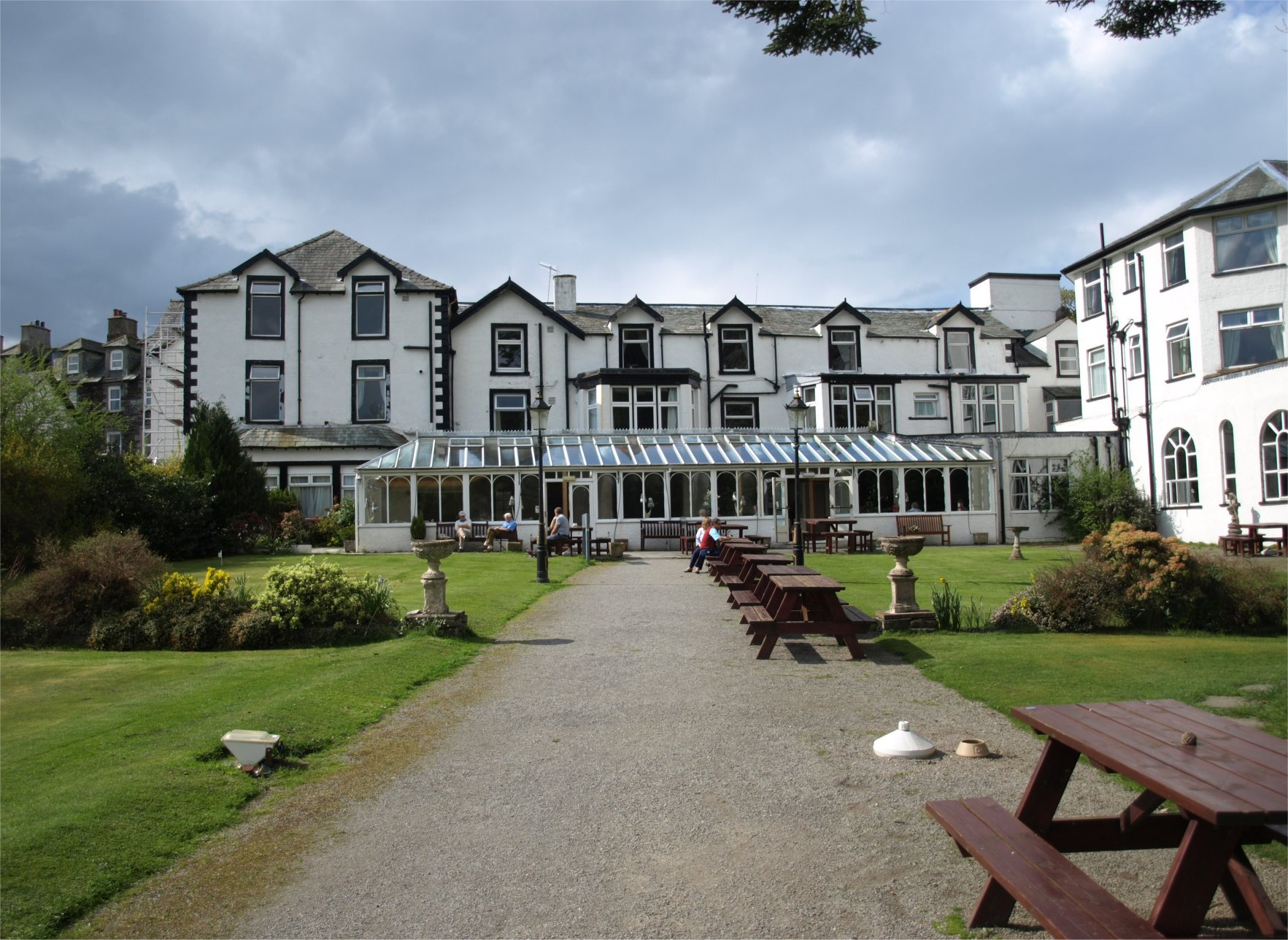
Derwentwater Hotel

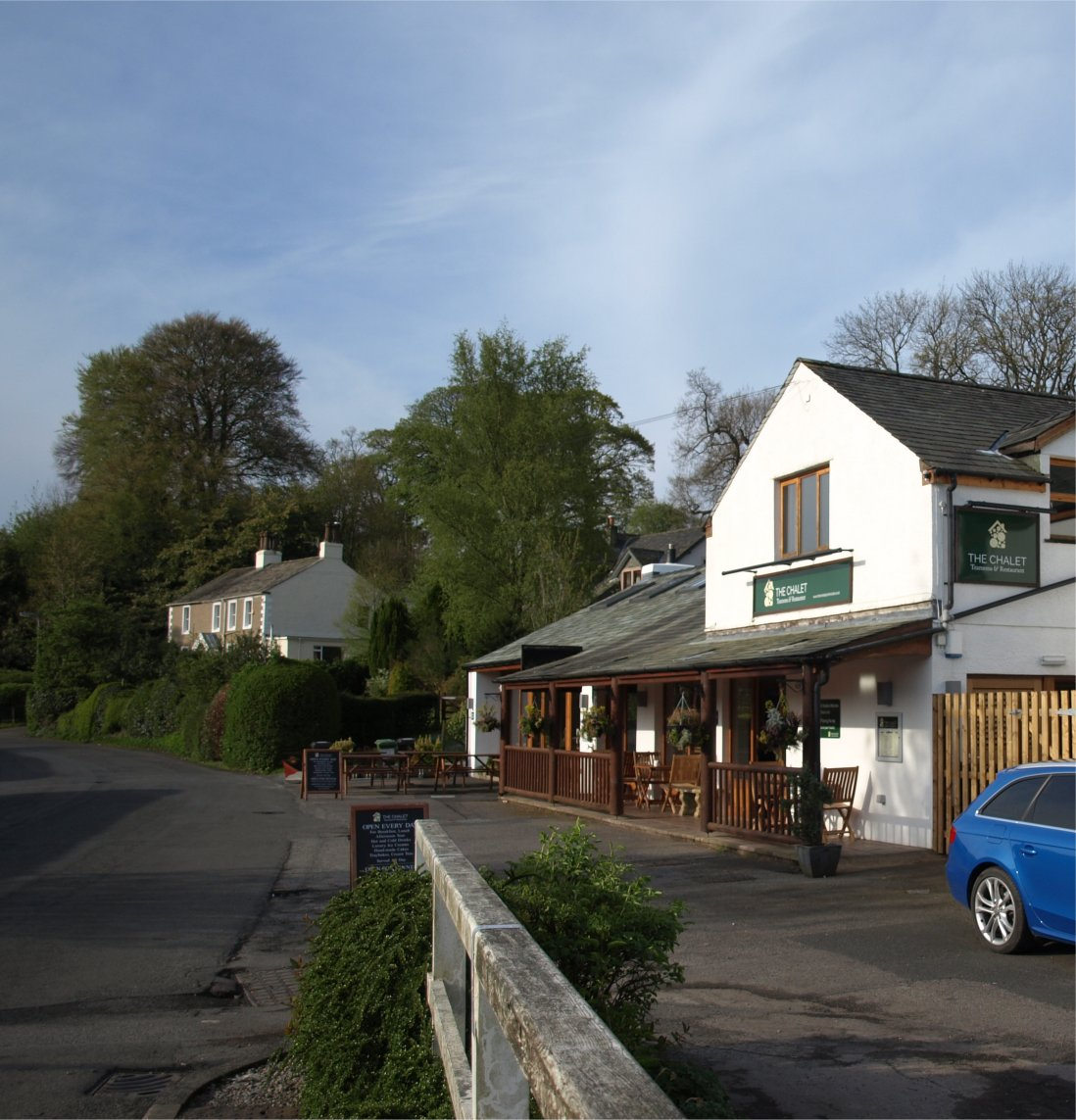
Finkle Street looking south

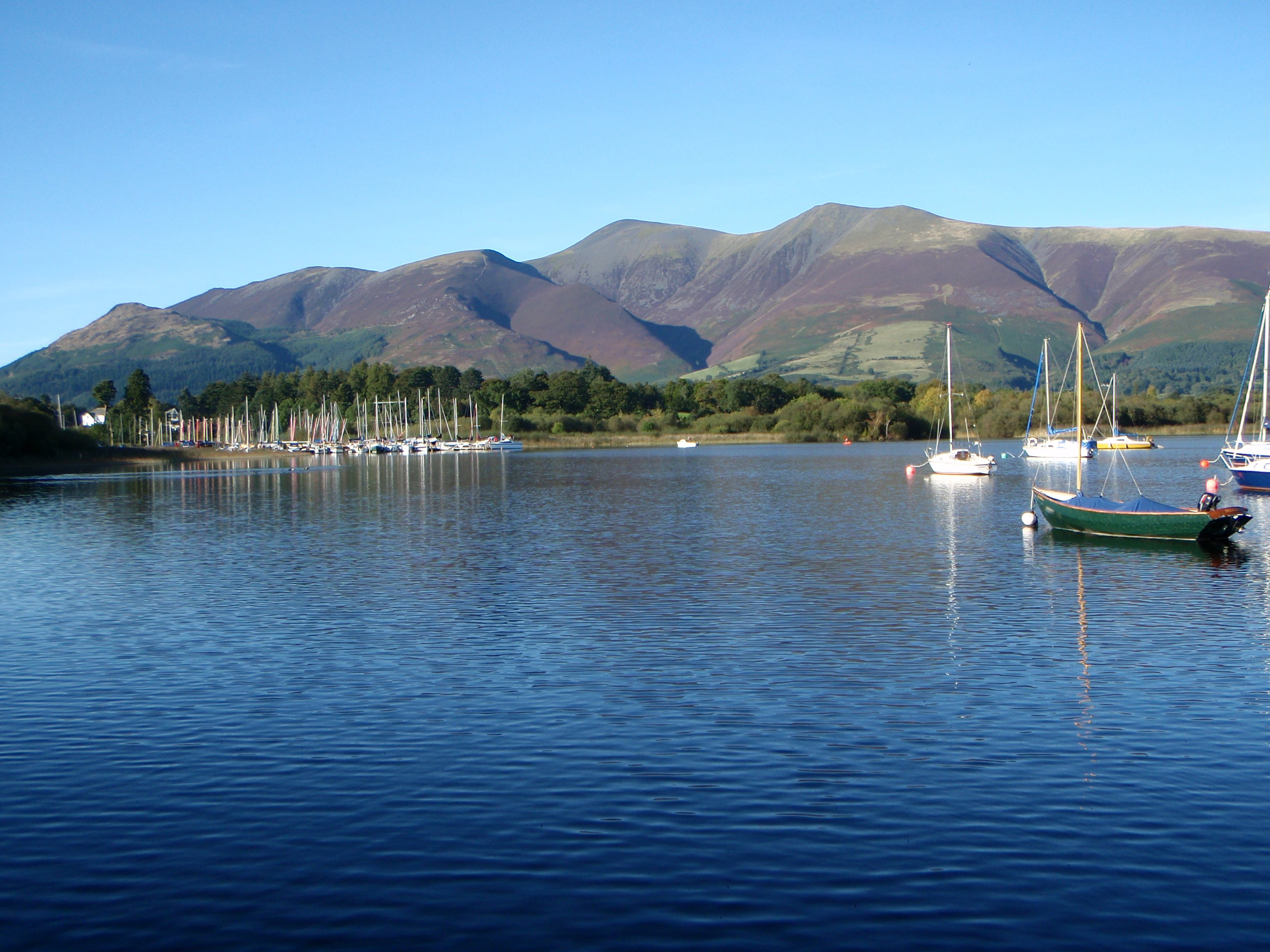
Moorings at Portinscale seen from Derwentwater

== Notes and references ==
Notes

== Sources ==
- Bott, George (1960). Keswick. Carlisle: Cumbria County Library. ISBN 0905404513.
- Collingwood, W G (1925). Lake District History. Kendal: T Wilson & Son. OCLC 2185332.
- Ekwall, Eilert (1959). Etymological notes on English place-names. Lund, Sweden: Lund University Press. OCLC 2634560.
- Ekwall, Eilert (1960). Concise Oxford Dictionary of English Place-names. Oxford: Oxford University Press. ISBN 0198691033.
- Fellows-Jensen, Gillian (2001). Denmark and Scotland: The Cultural and Environmental Resources of Small Nations. Copenhagen: Munksgaard. ISBN 8778762294.
- Kaye, J W (1966). "Governor's House, Keswick". Transactions of the Cumberland and Westmorland Antiquarian and Archaeological Society, New Series, Volume 66. Kendal: CWAAS. doi:10.5284/1062244. OCLC 784560247.
- Mannix, J; William Whellan (1974) [1847]. History, Gazetteer, and Directory of Cumberland. Cumberland: Michael Moon. ISBN 0904131033.
- Morris, Marjorie; Edna Hodgson (1994). Cumbria Within Living Memory. Newbury: Countryside Books. ISBN 1853063010.
- Thompson, Bruce L (1969). "Portinscale Bridge". Transactions of the Cumberland and Westmorland Antiquarian and Archaeological Society, New Series, Volume 69. Kendal: CWAAS. doi:10.5284/1062166.
- Wood, Lucy (2014). The Grimsby Book of Days. History Press. ISBN 978-0-7509-5743-4.
