= St Kentigern's Church, Crosthwaite =

Coordinates: 54.6083°N 3.1512°W

Crosthwaite Parish Church
- St Kentigern's Church, Crosthwaite
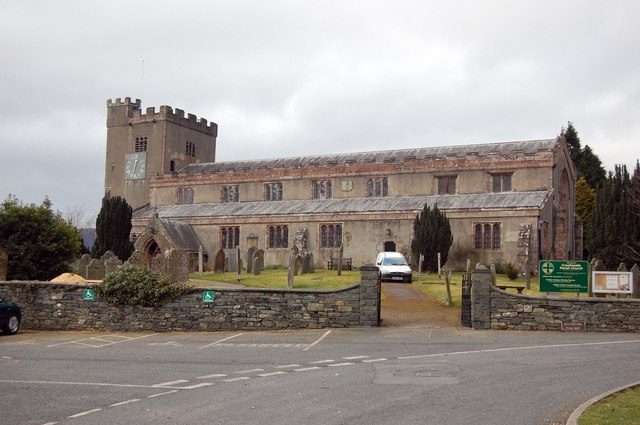
- Crosthwaite Parish Church
- OS grid reference: NY 25741 24285
- Location: Great Crosthwaite, Keswick, Cumbria
- Country: England
- Denomination: Church of England
- Churchmanship: Evangelical

History
- Status: Active
- Dedication: St Kentigern

Architecture
- Functional status: Parish Church
- Heritage designation: Grade II*
- Designated: 1951
- Completed: c. 1181

Administration
- Province: Province of York
- Diocese: Diocese of Carlisle
- Archdeaconry: Archdeacon of West Cumberland
- Deanery: Deanery of Derwent

Clergy
- Vicar: The Revd Andy Murphie

Crosthwaite Parish Church is a church at Great Crosthwaite on the outskirts of Keswick in Cumbria, England. It is dedicated to St Kentigern and is the Anglican church of the parish of Crosthwaite. Since 1951 it has been a Grade II* listed building. The church has an evangelical tradition.

There has been a church on the site since the 6th century. The present building is largely medieval, with some Victorian internal alterations. Among the vicars of the parish was Hardwicke Rawnsley, co-founder of the National Trust.

== History ==
The first church at Crosthwaite is believed to have been built in 553 AD under the direction of St Kentigern, who preached the Gospel in the area before moving on to Wales. No records survive of this building, or of its Saxon successor. Both were probably wooden structures. In 1181 Jocelyn of Furness wrote of a new church at Crosthwaite recently built for Alice de Romilly, the Lady of Allerdale. (Note: Alice, the widow of William fitz Duncan, Earl of Moray, also founded Bolton Abbey in Yorkshire and restored the nave of Carlisle Cathedral.) The new church was built of stone and consisted of the nave, a north aisle and a chancel with a chancel arch. There was neither a south aisle nor a tower. The foundations of this structure still exist. In 1189 Richard I gave the rectory of Crosthwaite to the Cistercians of Fountains Abbey in Yorkshire. Monks from the abbey worked the parish for the next three hundred years from their base at Monks Hall, which later became the site of Keswick hospital.

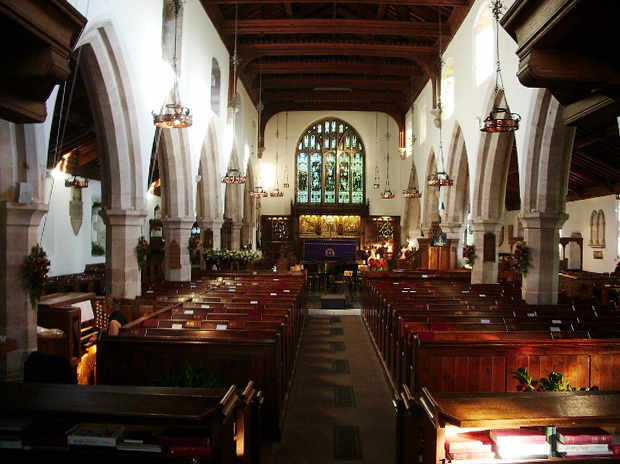
interior looking to the east

During the 14th century (the historians of the church, Tom Wilson and J W Kaye estimate the date to have been about 1340) a chapel was added to the north side of the chancel, and later a south aisle. In the early 16th century there were major changes to the building; the chancel arch was removed, a clerestory was added and existing side chapels were reconstructed. The last important change during the medieval period was the erection of the present tower; the exact date is not recorded.

The church was little changed, and was evidently neglected, in the 17th and 18th centuries. In the 19th century there was extensive internal work, some of which, in Wilson and Kaye's word, was "unfortunate". Among those responsible was George Gilbert Scott, who restored the church in 1844. The work was funded by a local benefactor as part of the memorial to the poet Robert Southey, who is buried in the churchyard. In addition to Scott's internal alterations, the church was re-roofed and re-seated. The altar designed by Scott was moved to St John's in the Vale church in 1893. In 1909 the western end of the south aisle was converted into a baptistry to mark Hardwicke Rawnsley's 25 years of service as vicar. The font, moved to its new site, had been given to the church about 1400. The font ewer was made at the Keswick School of Industrial Art, which was co-founded by Rawnsley's wife, Edith.

== Features ==
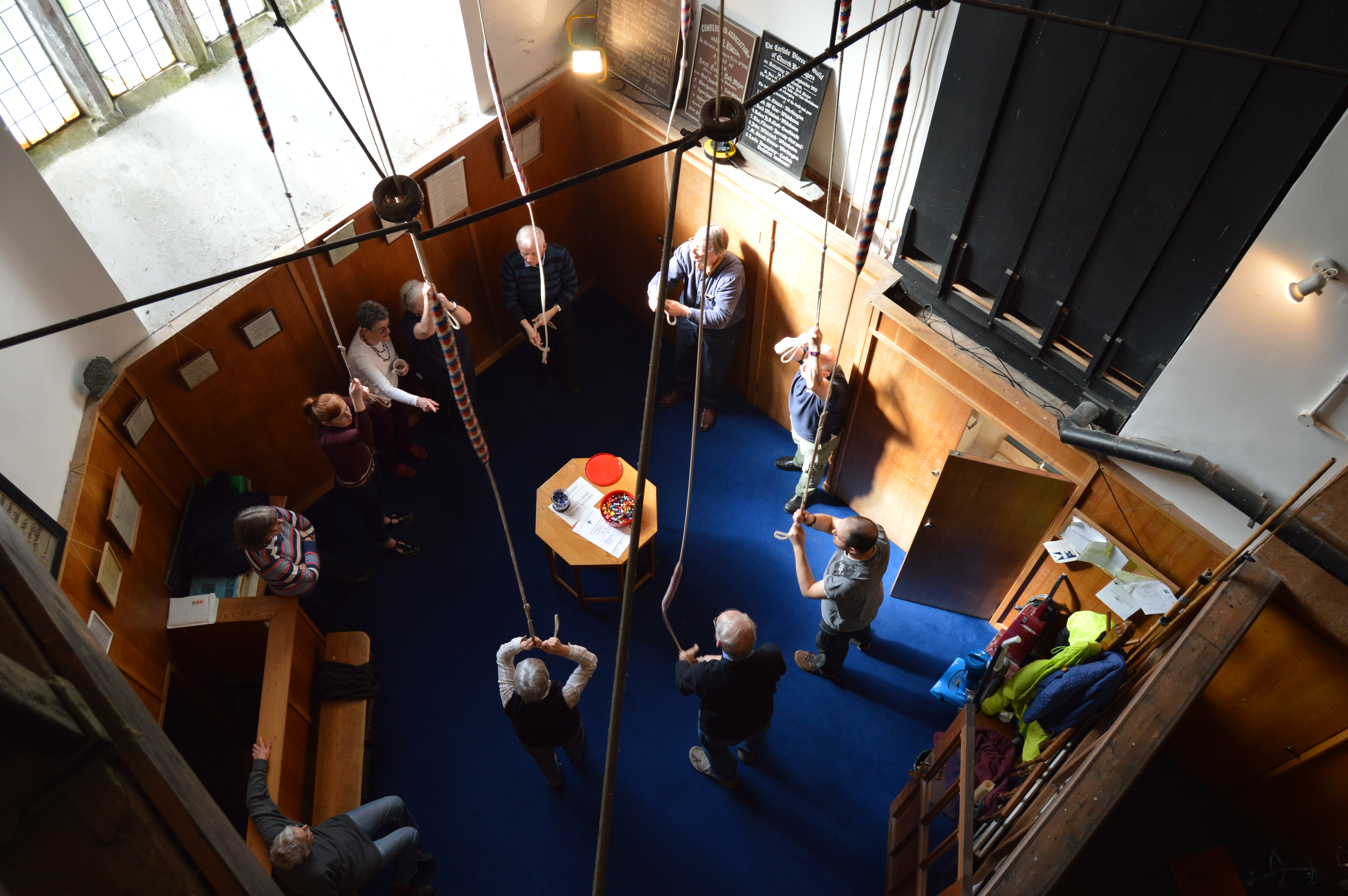
The eight bells are rung from the ground floor.

The church has a large organ. The present instrument dates from 1920 when the organ dating from 1837 was rebuilt and enlarged. It is dedicated to the men of Crosthwaite who died in the First World War. Their names are listed on a plaque in the north aisle.

The church has a ring of eight bells, with the tenor bell weighing 15½ hundredweight (787 kilos). In 1765 there were four bells, increased to six in 1767, and to the present eight in 1882. Unusually for Cumbria, they are rung from the ground floor, and consequently have an elaborate system of rope guides. Ringing can be easily observed by the public through the glass partition windows. The first full peal on the bells was 5,040 changes of Grandsire Triples on 17 December 1895 and was conducted by Stephen Hogarth. There is a remarkable set of the ringers' rules dating from 1826, which is displayed in a large frame in the ringing chamber; they were penned by the English master from St Bees School.

The church has Tudor consecration crosses, both inside and out. It is unique in having had a complete surviving set of twelve exterior crosses. Nine interior crosses remain; the other three are thought to have been inadvertently destroyed during 19th-century attempts at restoration. (Note: The church's own website states that there are only three exterior crosses rather than the twelve noted by Wilson and Kaye. John Betjeman was aware of nine of the twelve.) According to Wilson and Kaye the existence of the crosses shows that the church was consecrated "to the 'English use' (secundum consuetudinem)" and not according to Roman Catholic rite.

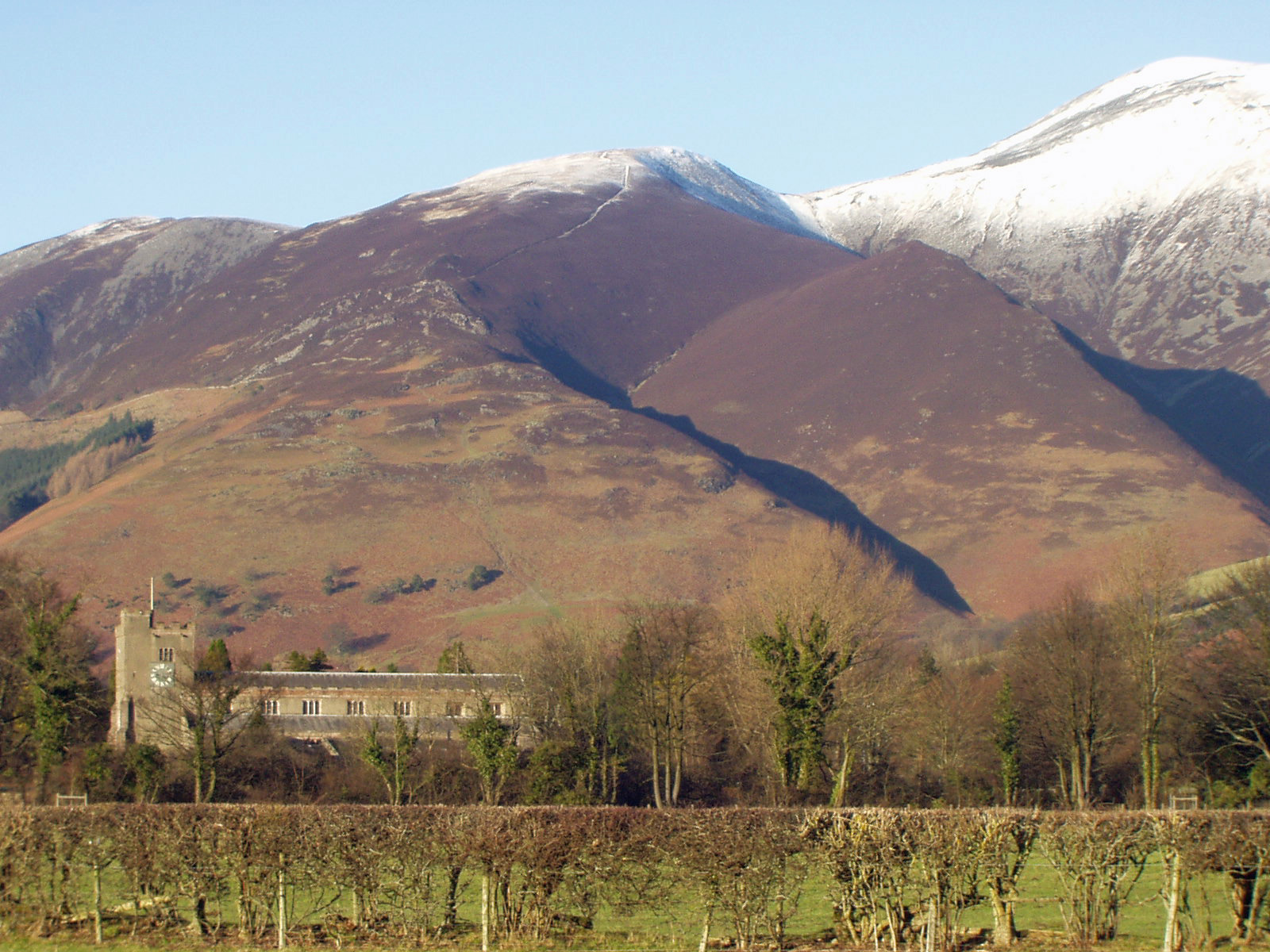
Crosthwaite Church viewed from the direction of the village of Portinscale

In a 1960s guide John Betjeman drew attention to some of the above and to the finely carved 14th-century font, a number of 15th-century effigies, the reredos by the Keswick School of Industrial Art and the altar draped with a banner bearing the Greek motto "εν τούτῳ νίκα", meaning "in this sign you will conquer", a motto adopted by Constantine the Great and by the Knights Templar. The reredos incorporates three repoussé panels by Edith Rawnsley and John Birkett, who were also responsible for the hanging lights, the mosaics and the pulpit.

The monument to Robert Southey (1846) is by John Graham Lough. Southey is depicted in marble, with one hand resting on his heart and the other on a book, with an epitaph by William Wordsworth; "Ye Vales and Hills, whose beauty hither drew/The poet's steps, and fixed him here, on you/His eyes have closed."

The churchyard contains some "outstandingly good" slate gravestones and a "forest of Celtic cross headstones".

== Vicars ==
The first vicar of Crosthwaite whose name is on record was Jeffrey Wethamstede, incumbent in 1294. Probably the best-known vicar was Hardwicke Rawnsley, a co-founder of the National Trust, who was appointed vicar of Crosthwaite, and Rural Dean, in 1883. After 34 years Rawnsley retired to Grasmere where he died. He is buried in the churchyard of his former parish, not far from the grave of Southey. The vicar, at 2020, succeeding the Rev Stuart Penny, is the Rev Andy Murphie.

== See also ==
- Grade II* listed buildings in Cumberland
- Listed buildings in Keswick, Cumbria
- List of churches in Allerdale

== Notes and references ==
Notes

== Sources ==
- Betjeman, John (1968). Collins Pocket Guide to English Parish Churches: the North. London: Collins. OCLC 25666897.
- Bridge, Norman (1986). Ten Ordinary Poems. Keswick: Ferguson.
- Fraser, Maxwell (1937). Companion Into Lakeland. Methuen & Co.
- Manders, Henry (1853). The History of the Church of Crosthwaite, Cumberland. London: J B Nichols. OCLC 6612939.
- Wilson, Tom; revised by J W Kaye (1970) [1939]. History of Crosthwaite Parish Church. Keswick: McKane. OCLC 500098767.
- Hyde, Matthew; Pevsner, Nikolaus (2010). The Buildings Of England: Cumbria. Yale University Press. ISBN 978-0-300-12663 1.
