= Robert Hunter (civil servant) =

English co-founder of the National Trust

Sir Robert Hunter KCB
- Hunter in his later years
- Born: 27 October 1844
- Died: 6 November 1913 (aged 69)
- Occupations: Solicitor; Civil Servant
- Known for: Co-founding the National Trust

Sir Robert Hunter KCB (27 October 1844 – 6 November 1913) was a solicitor, civil servant and co-founder of the National Trust.

From the 1860s Hunter was interested in conservation of public open spaces, and worked with other pioneers in this field, including Octavia Hill and Hardwicke Rawnsley. After acting as adviser to Hill in her campaigns to save Hampstead Heath and other open spaces, he worked with Rawnsley to save land in the English Lake District from industrial development. In 1893 the three campaigners agreed to set up a national body to acquire vulnerable properties and preserve them for the nation. At Hunter's suggestion it was entitled "the National Trust for Places of Historic Interest or Natural Beauty", generally known simply as "the National Trust". Hunter was the founding chairman of the trust's executive board.

From 1882 until the year of his death Hunter was solicitor to the General Post Office. His negotiations in that capacity were estimated to have saved the British taxpayer many millions of pounds.

== Life and career ==
=== Early years ===
Hunter was born at Addington Square, in the south London suburb of Camberwell, the elder child and only son of Robert Lachlan Hunter, a master mariner and shipowner, and his wife, Anne, née Lachlan. He was educated privately until 1861 when he was admitted to University College London. In the same year his family left London for Dorking, which was his first contact with the commons and hills of Surrey which he would come to love in later life.

Hunter was awarded a first-class degree in logic and moral philosophy in 1863. At his father's suggestion he took up a post as an articled clerk in a firm of solicitors in London. Finding the work uninteresting he read for a master's degree in his spare time.

In 1866 the philanthropist and politician Henry Peek ran a contest offering prizes of £400 for essays on the best means of preserving common land for the public. Hunter's entry, "The Preservation of Commons in the Neighbourhood of the Metropolis", was one of six winning essays. He traced the history and legal standing of the rights of common: "substantial privileges which were maintainable at law. Though a person claiming common of pasture in another's soil had no interest in that soil, yet he had a certain right over it, and could prevent by legal process any dealings with it which would prejudice this right." This principle, Hunter maintained, had been extended from old grazing rights to a modern requirement that common land should not be enclosed without due regard for "the health, comfort and convenience of the inhabitants" of nearby urban areas.

The six essays were published in one volume in 1867. In the same year Hunter was admitted solicitor. He became a partner in Fawcett, Horne, and Hunter, solicitors to the recently established Commons Preservation Society.

=== Commons Preservation Society ===
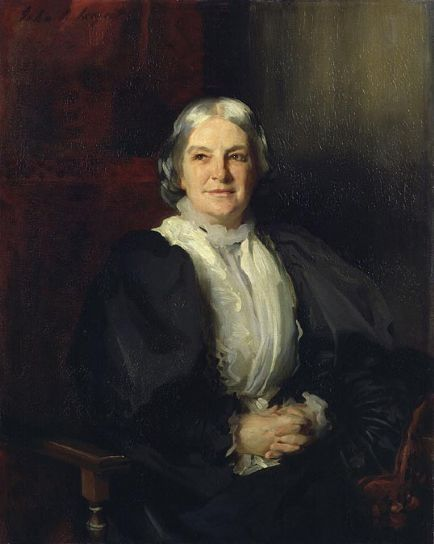
Octavia Hill

Hunter worked with the society to save common land from enclosure. He instituted legal actions that ensured protection of Hampstead Heath, and Berkhamsted, Plumstead, Wimbledon and Tooting commons and other open spaces threatened with enclosure. Most of the principles of public interest expounded in his 1866 essay were incorporated into English law in 1875. From the latter year onwards, Hunter was Octavia Hill's adviser on the protection of open spaces in London.

One of Hunter's most celebrated successes was the rescue from enclosure of 3,000 acres of Epping Forest, with the support of the corporation of the City of London. The case was bitterly contested across three years. Hunter acted with the corporation's solicitor, Sir Thomas Nelson, in the conduct of the legal proceedings. In 1882 Queen Victoria went to the forest and formally declared it "available for her people's enjoyment".

=== Post Office ===
A leading member of the Commons Preservation Society during this period was the Liberal politician Henry Fawcett. He was appointed Postmaster General by Gladstone in 1880. When the post of solicitor to the General Post Office (GPO) became vacant in 1881 Fawcett decided that Hunter would be the best choice for the position. Hunter's fitness for the post was confirmed by independent advisers and he was appointed on 1 February 1882. Fawcett later said that nothing in his official career had given him more satisfaction than securing a man of Hunter's character and ability for the service of the nation.

Hunter remained as solicitor to the GPO until the year of his death. Much of his work was in preparing draft legislation on Post Office matters to be put before Parliament. There were more than fifty such drafts during Hunter's tenure. His biographer L W Chubb singles out the Conveyance of Mails Act, 1893, which established an arbitration procedure for disputes between the railway companies and the GPO about charges for transporting mail by train. Chubb calculates that this one measure saved the taxpayer more than £10m. Hunter's other most important contribution, in Chubb's view, was the negotiation of the terms for acquiring the National Telephone Company's system, which saved another £8.5m.

=== National Trust ===
In 1883 Canon Hardwicke Rawnsley was engaged in a campaign to stop the construction of railways from quarries in the fells overlooking Buttermere, in the English Lake District, with damaging effect on the unspoilt scenery. He secured the support of John Ruskin, Octavia Hill and Hunter, and was successful in stopping the development. Both Hunter and Rawnsley, building on an idea put forward by Ruskin, advocated a trust that could buy and preserve places of natural beauty and historic interest for the nation.

The need for such a body was emphasised in 1886, when the owner of Sayes Court, a manor house in Deptford, wished to give it to the nation, but could not because no national organisation existed to accept the gift. He established a permanent trust under the chairmanship of the vicar of the parish, and presented the house and gardens with a substantial financial endowment to maintain them.

Hardwicke Rawnsley

In November 1893 Hill, Hunter and Rawnsley met at the offices of the Commons Preservation Society. They agreed to set up a national body, to propagate the formation of a "National Trust for Places of Historic Interest or Natural Beauty". In July 1894 the trust was formally inaugurated under the presidency of the Duke of Westminster. At the inaugural meeting Rawnsley declared, to cheering, that the aim was to establish "a great National Gallery of natural pictures". Hunter was appointed chairman of the executive committee. In the same year he was knighted for his services to conservation.

Hunter had warned the inaugural meeting that the trust would be on a truly secure footing only if it obtained the permanent status granted by either a royal charter or an Act of Parliament. He drafted the 1907 National Trust Bill, which was put before Parliament, giving the trust the status of a statutory corporation. He gave formal evidence to the parliamentary committee that scrutinised the bill, and the bill was passed in August 1907.

By the time of the 1907 Act, the trust had acquired 25 properties in England, Wales and Ireland, ranging from 850 acres of open country in the Lake District, to common land in Surrey to castles in County Cork and Derbyshire to coastal land in Cornwall and Cambridgeshire.

Hunter was appointed CB in 1909 and promoted to KCB in 1911 for his services to the Post Office. He retired at the end of July 1913, and died at the age of 69 of toxaemia less than four months later at his house at Meadfields Hanger, Haslemere, Surrey. Fourteen acres of water and woodland at Waggoners Wells were bought by public subscription and given to the National Trust to honour his memory.

== Personal life ==
In 1869 Hunter married Emily Browning; she died in childbirth on 2 January 1872. He did not remarry until May 1877. His second wife, Ellen née Cann (1851–1932) was the daughter of a land surveyor, Samuel Cann. There were three daughters of the second marriage. In politics, The Times said, "Sir Robert was a robust thoughtful Liberal of the older type. As a speaker he was admirably clear and direct, articulate but not rhetorical, relying far more on the persuasive forced of exact statement than on appeals to emotion." In religion, he was a broad-church Anglican.
