= Halton Holegate =

Village in Lincolnshire, England

Coordinates: 53.167585°N 0.119295°E

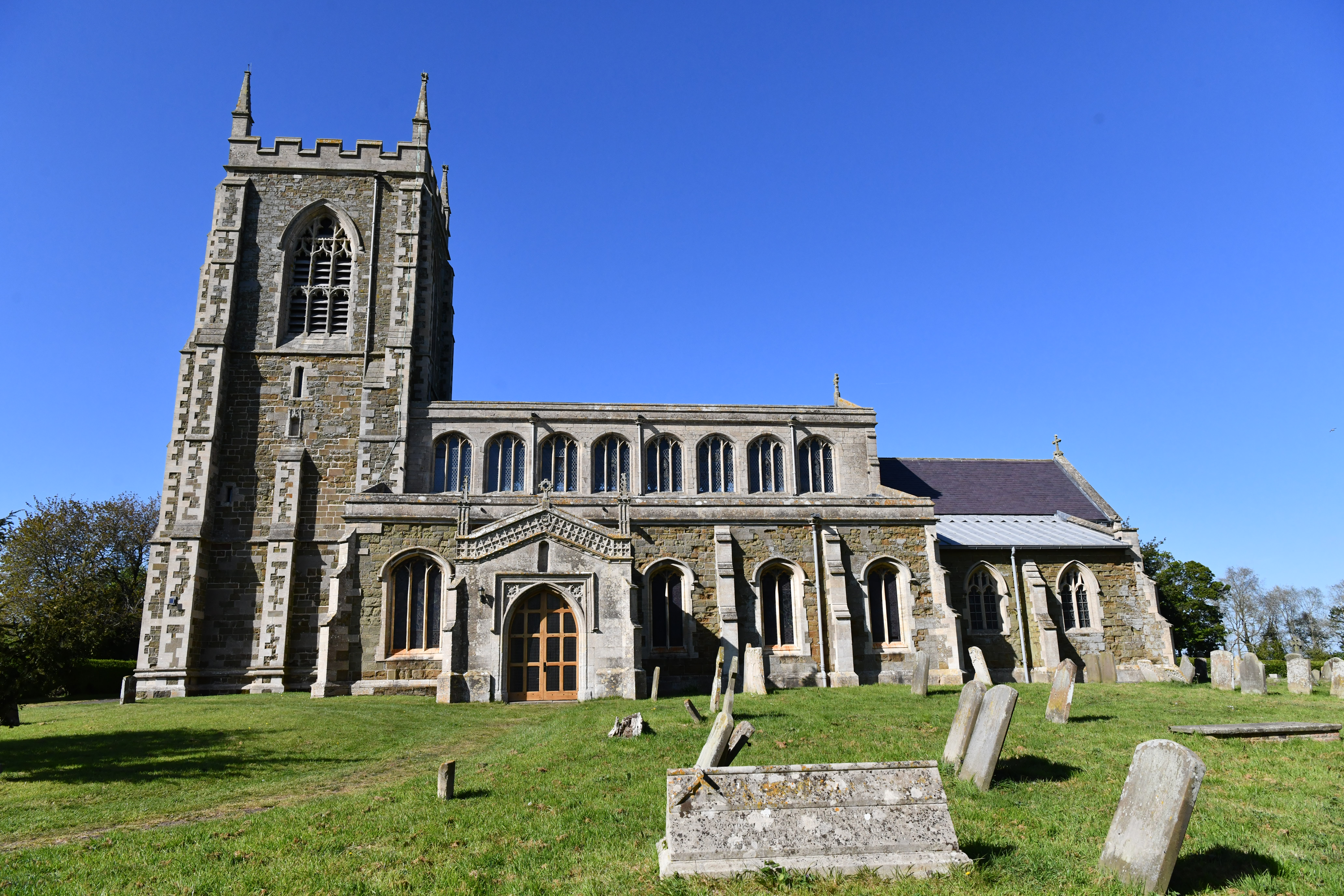
- Church of St Andrew, Halton Holegate

- Location within Lincolnshire
- Population: 475 (2011)
- OS grid reference: TF417654
  - London: 115 mi (185 km) S
- District: East Lindsey
- Shire county: Lincolnshire
- Region: East Midlands
- Country: England
- Sovereign state: United Kingdom
- Post town: SPILSBY
- Postcode district: PE23
- Police: Lincolnshire
- Fire: Lincolnshire
- Ambulance: East Midlands
- UK Parliament: Louth and Horncastle

Halton Holegate is a small village in the East Lindsey district of Lincolnshire, England. It is situated 1 mile (1.6 km) east from Spilsby.

== History ==
The village Anglican church is Grade II* listed and dedicated to St Andrew. Originating from the 14th century with later additions, it is chiefly Perpendicular in style, except for the tower and the east end which were rebuilt in 1866 by James Fowler.

=== 1977 Vulcan crash ===
Avro Vulcan 'XM600' crashed at 3.50pm on 17 January 1977, from RAF Waddington 101 Sqn Five aircrew parachuted, who were taken to the Pilgrim Hospital in Boston, then to RAF Hospital Nocton Hall. Lindsey Fire Brigade attended from Skegness, Alford, Horncastle.

- Pilot - 30 year old Robert Aspinall
- Co-pilot - 27 year old Neil Ryder of Welton, Lincolnshire
- Navigator - 26 year old John Critchley of Lincoln
- Navigator - 45 year old John Clark of Lincoln
- Air Electronics Officer - 45 year old Vernon Prior of Waddington

== Geography ==
The village also has a public house.

== Governance ==
An electoral ward in the same name exists. This ward stretches south west to East Kirkby with a total population taken at the 2011 census of 2,495.
