= Damian Lundy =

British religious brother (1944–1997)

Damian Lundy (1944–1997) was a religious brother of the de La Salle Order. He was born as Michael Lundy in Sowerby Bridge in Yorkshire on 21 March 1944. Some sources state that he died in 1996, but others that it was in 1997 at the age of 53. He entered the De la Salle Brothers order in 1960. He is widely respected as a leading innovator in many forms of Catholic ministry and education in the UK. He is credited with devising the current standard form of Catholic Residential Youth Work and for writing many popular hymns and prayers and leading seminars and conferences.

In 1975, Damian founded St Cassian's Centre, Kintbury, in Berkshire, a widely visited and respected Catholic Youth Retreat Centre, which as of October 2023 is still operating.

He is remembered for his popular hymn, Walk in the light, and for verses 3-5 added to Jimmy Owens' hymn This is my body, broken for you.

== Publications ==
Lundy's writing include:

- What's the Point of It All? (Scripture for Living), 1992
- Songs of the Spirit, 1978
- Hymns Old and New – with Kevin Mayhew, 1980
