= Catholic residential youth work =

Youth centres operated by the Catholic Church

Young people at a team building activity at Castlerigg Manor

Catholic residential youth work is the work of the youth retreat centres and residential centres operated by the Catholic Church. In the UK, Catholic residential youth work is an important part of the Church's ministry to young people.

== History ==
There are eleven youth retreat centres in the UK. The centres grew up in the era immediately following the Second Vatican Council, reflecting a renewed interest in both ministry within the Church and in work with young people following the Albemarle Report in the 1960s. Not all of them would use the term retreat centre, but it is a useful catch-all. The oldest one is Soli House in Stratford-Upon-Avon, but it was St Cassian's Centre, Kintbury which pioneered the model of work in the field.

St Cassian's (known as Kintbury) was established by Damian Lundy in 1975 and pioneered a system based largely on having a volunteer team of young Catholics near to the ages of the young people they were working with. The system closely followed an Australian system Lundy had observed, a system which, in turn, was heavily based on an approach common in the US. It relied on these young Catholics sharing their stories. Peer ministry was always important to Lundy and narrative theology - the practice of ministry through sharing personal experiences and accounts - has always been an important facet of the De La Salle Brothers, the religious institute to which Lundy belonged. Many of the centres employ a programme based on the one brought by Lundy.

Eight of the centres are diocesan (i.e. run by dioceses) and five are run by religious institutes. Religious centres are able to supplement their spiritual side by drawing on the traditions and spirituality of the institute they represent. Diocesan centres, on the other hand often feel far more connected to the Church and therefore have a larger pool of resources and support to draw on and find recruitment to teams and finding clientele slightly easier.

== Community living and a change of scene ==
Young people at Castlerigg Manor

The fact that young people on retreats or courses are brought away from their normal environment and into community living for a week is the basis of much of the practice. By living in community for a week, young people can be encouraged to look out for one another and to strengthening relationships with one another and with God.

== UK Centres ==
Current

- Alton Castle (Archdiocese of Birmingham)
- The Briars (Diocese of Nottingham)
- Castlerigg Manor (Diocese of Lancaster)
- St Cassian's Centre (De La Salle Brothers)
- St. Vincent's Centre (Archdiocese of Southwark)
- Animate Youth Ministries (Archdiocese of Liverpool)
- Savio House (Salesians of Don Bosco - SDB)
- Soli House (Archdiocese of Birmingham)
- SPEC (Archdiocese of Westminster)
- Walsingham House (Diocese of Brentwood)
- Emmaus Village (Diocese of Hexham and Newcastle)

No longer running

- Myddelton Grange ([Diocese of Leeds]) (Closed 2016)
- Dehon House (Run by the Sacred Heart Fathers for the Diocese of Shrewsbury) (Closed in 2003)
- Southwell House (Jesuit Order) (Closed)
- Brettargh Holt (Salesian Sisters) (Closed)

== The Conference ==
Each year at the start of January the volunteers and other staff at the various centres are invited to attend a conference. This is attended by between 8-10 of the centres and provides Catholic residential youth workers with an opportunity to meet each other and exchange ideas. The conference is held in a different centre each year. Past conferences are as follows:

- 1996 - Savio House
- 1997 - St. Cassian's Centre, Kintbury
- 1998 - The Briars
- 1999 - SPEC Centre
- 2000 - Alton Castle
- 2001 - Soli House
- 2002 - Dehon House
- 2003 - SPEC Centre (co-organised with St. Cassian's Centre)
- 2004 - Savio House
- 2005 - Alton Castle
- 2006 - St. Cassian's Centre, Kintbury
- 2007 - Castlerigg Manor
- 2008 - SPEC Centre
- 2009 - SPEC Centre
- 2010 - The Hayes Conference Centre
- 2011 - The Hayes Conference Centre
- 2012 - The Hayes Conference Centre
- 2013 - The Hayes Conference Centre
- 2014 - The Hayes Conference Centre
- 2015 - The Hayes Conference Centre
