= Greta Hall =

Building in Keswick, Cumbria, England

Coordinates: 54.6039°N 3.1390°W

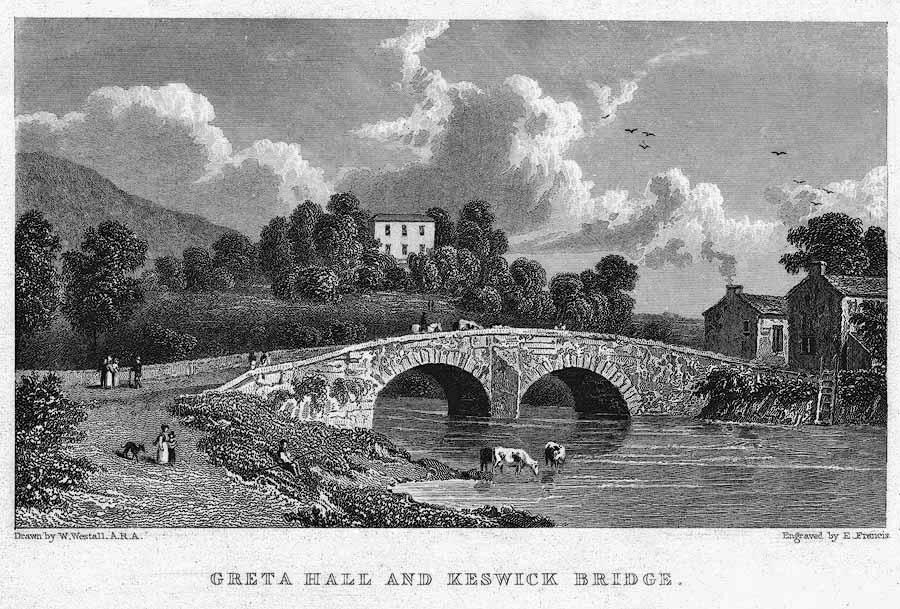
Greta Hall, c. 1840

Greta Hall is a house in Keswick in the Lake District of England. It is best known as the home of the poets Samuel Taylor Coleridge and Robert Southey.

== Overview ==
The official address of Greta Hall is Main Street, Keswick, but it is located some 150 metres to the north east of the road on higher ground. The house is described by Historic England:

The house is late C18. Front 3 storeys, with quoins and plinth, centre flush-panelled double doors (Gothic top panels glazed with net tracery), Ionic doorcase with fluted 3/4 columns, frieze, cornice and dentilled pediment. 3 sash windows on each floor (2 to left and 1 to right on ground floor, other storeys symmetrical), all 12-paned, in stone architraves. Large segmental 2-storeyed bow on right hand return side, otherwise 3 storeys with a Venetian window. Left hand return side has a similar Venetian window and a half-bow. Interior has good carved oak fireplace dated 1684 in "Southey's parlour", flag floors and old ovens in kitchens, and main windows with fluted interior wood cases. Simple wood staircase.

== Notable tenants and visitors ==
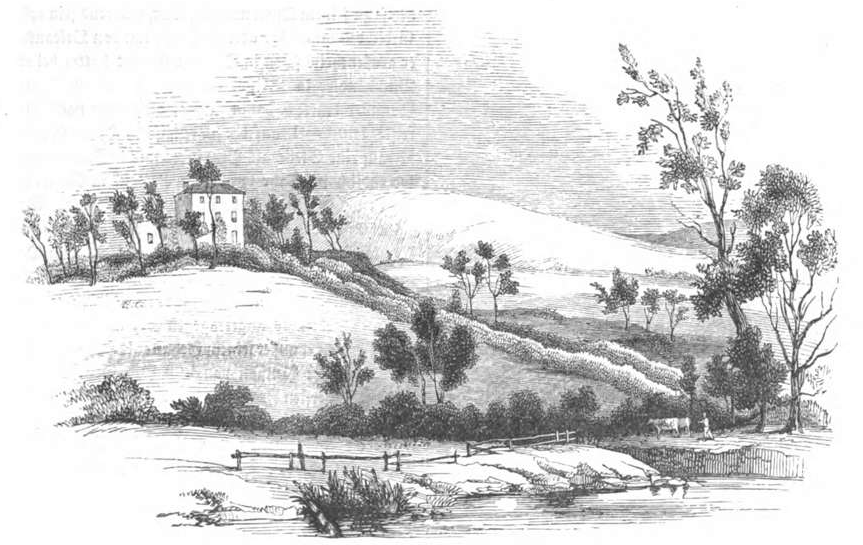
Greta Hall in 1843

The poet Samuel Taylor Coleridge lived at Greta Hall with his family from 24 July 1800 until 1803 and regularly visited William Wordsworth in Grasmere. Coleridge's daughter Sara was born at Greta Hall in 1802. Robert Southey and his wife came to stay with the Coleridges in 1803, and took over the tenancy of Greta Hall when Coleridge left in 1804. Southey lived there until his death in 1843.

Greta Hall was visited by a number of the Lake Poets and other literary figures including William Wordsworth, Dorothy Wordsworth, William Hazlitt, Lord Byron, John Keats, Percy Bysshe Shelley, Sir Walter Scott, Sir George Beaumont, Charles Lamb and Mary Lamb 1802, Thomas De Quincey and John Ruskin. On July 5, 1877 Pedro II, the Emperor of Brazil, and his wife Empress Teresa Cristina arrived in Keswick from Scotland anxious to see the memorials of Robert Southey, of whose "History of Brazil" he is said to have spoken with gratification. Entering Crosthwaite Church, he inspected the monument to the poet, reading the inscription on it by Wordsworth, and after visiting the Laureate's grave in the churchyard, went over to Greta Hall.

== Later times ==
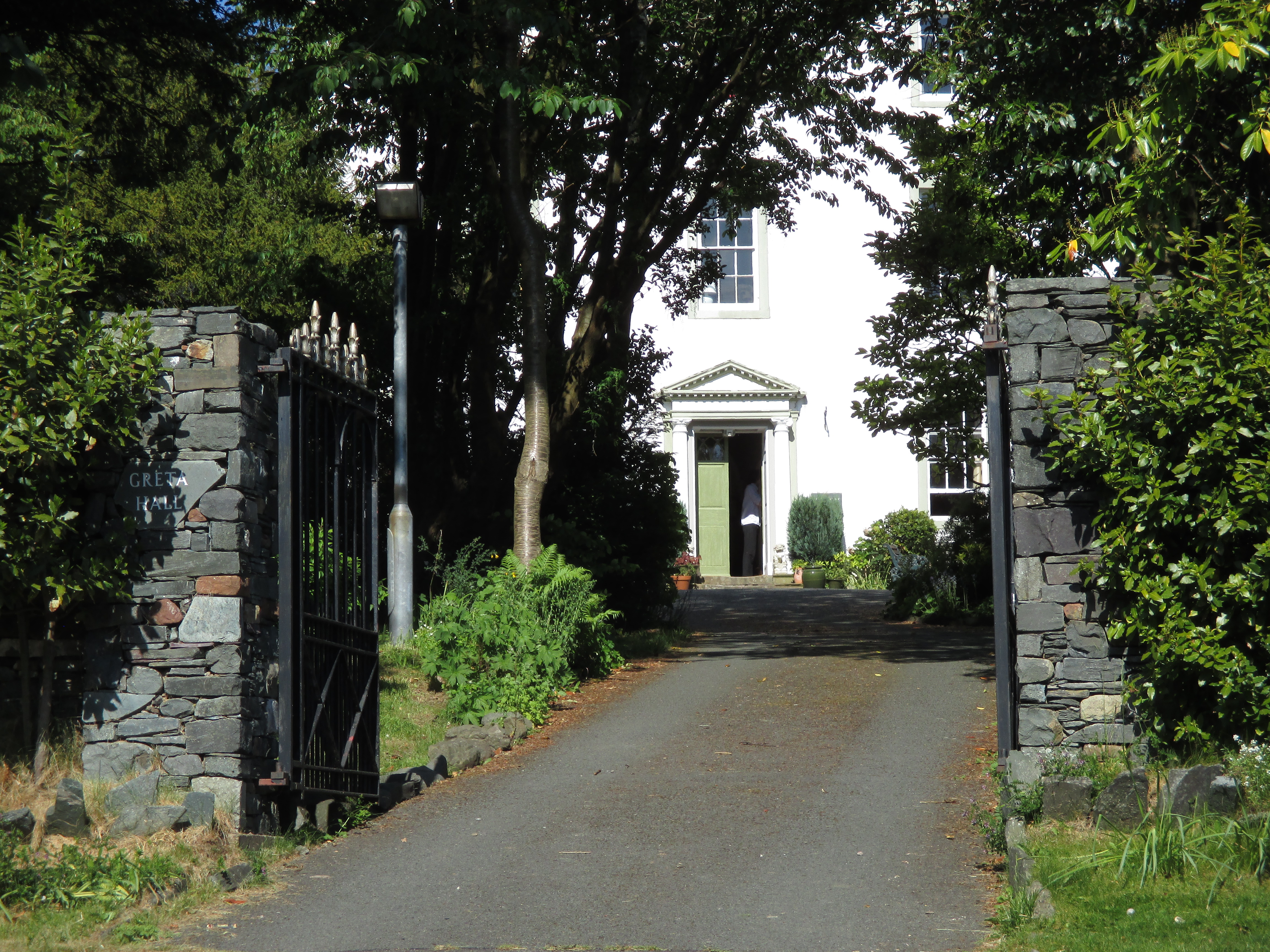
The entrance to Greta Hall

Between 1872 and 1887 it was a girls’ school. In 1909 it was bought by Canon Rawnsley and rented to the headmaster of Keswick School as a girls’ boarding house. In 1921 it was bought by the governors of the school and remained a girls’ boarding house until 1994.

== See also ==
- Listed buildings in Keswick, Cumbria
- Dove Cottage
- Rydal Mount
- Wordsworth House

== Sources ==
- Bott, George (1994). Keswick – The Story of a Lake District Town. Carlisle: Cumbria County Library. ISBN 978-0-905404-51-6.
