= William Winterbourne =

Executed man

William Winterbourne, also known as William Smith, was the very first of the "Victims of Whiggery" to be hanged at Reading Gaol on 11 January 1831 for his part in the Swing Riots of 1830. He was born in Kintbury in 1798. The riots involved agricultural labourers and others from the south and east of England whose livelihoods were threatened by the introduction of threshing machines, low wages and oppressive treatment. His hanging, in retrospect, is considered harsh, as nobody was injured in the riots. Even at the time, the vicar of Kintbury, the Rev Fulwar Craven Fowle, pleaded for Winterbourne's life, but to no avail. Unusually for hanged men his body was returned to Kintbury and buried in the churchyard. An annual ceremony is held there on every anniversary to remember him. It has included a descendant of William Winterbourne.

Williams Gravestone
