= Kintbury Newt Ponds =

Nature reserve in Berkshire, England

Coordinates: 51.3949°N 1.4459°W

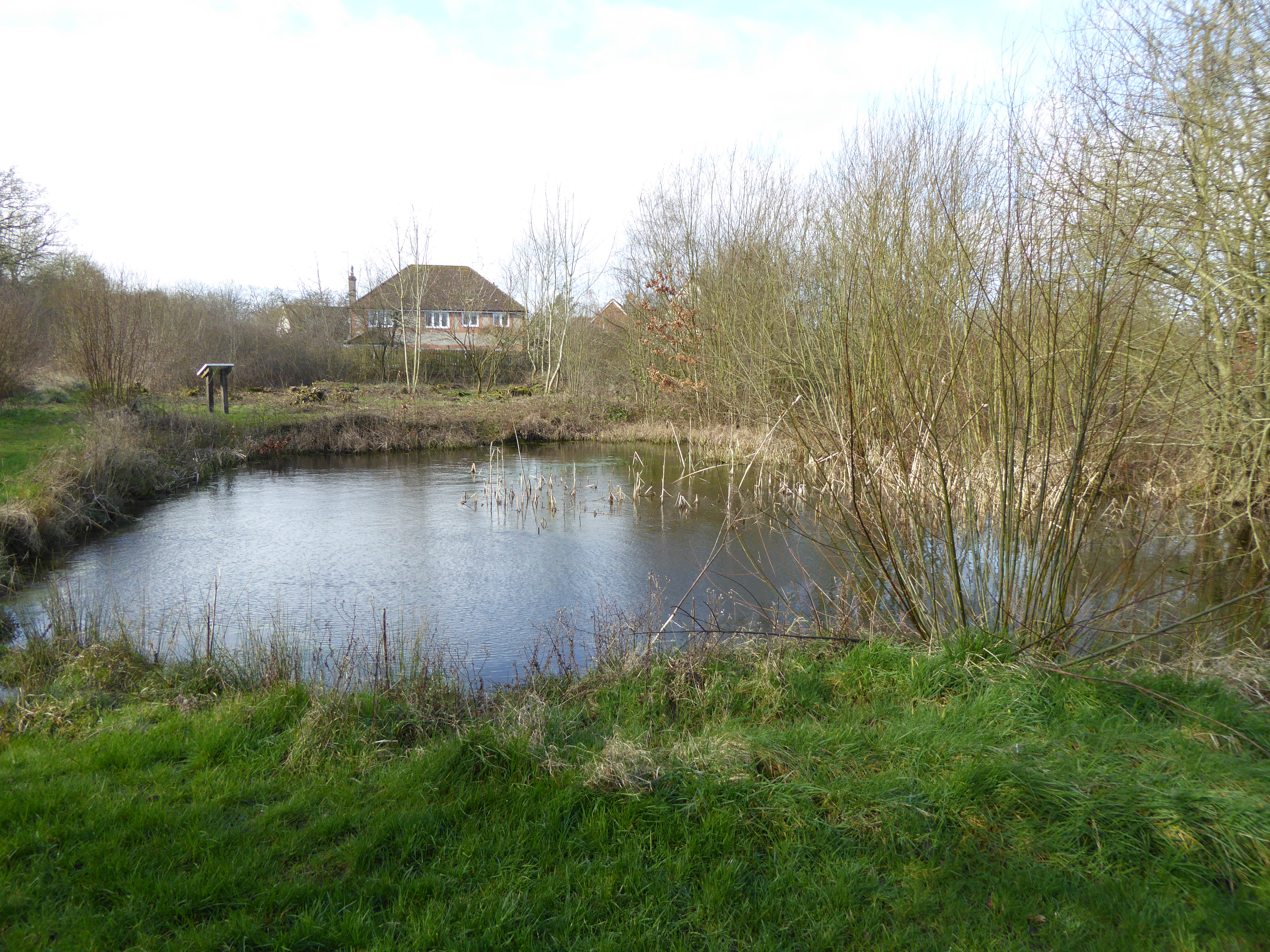
- Interactive map of Kintbury Newt Ponds
- Type: Nature reserve
- Location: Kintbury, Berkshire
- OS grid: SU386663
- Area: 3 hectares (7.4 acres)
- Manager: Berkshire, Buckinghamshire and Oxfordshire Wildlife Trust

Kintbury Newt Ponds is a 3-hectare (7.4-acre) nature reserve in Kintbury in Berkshire. It is managed by the Berkshire, Buckinghamshire and Oxfordshire Wildlife Trust.

The reserve is made up of several ponds, reedbed, scrub and grassland.

== History ==
Kintbury Newt Ponds was given its nature reserve status in the late 1990s when the site was discovered to have resident Great Crested Newts, which stopped a housing development being built on the site.

== Fauna ==
The site has the following fauna:

=== Amphibians ===
- Great Crested Newt
- Smooth Newt
- Palmate newt
