= St Cassian's Centre =

Catholic Youth Retreat Centre in Berkshire, England

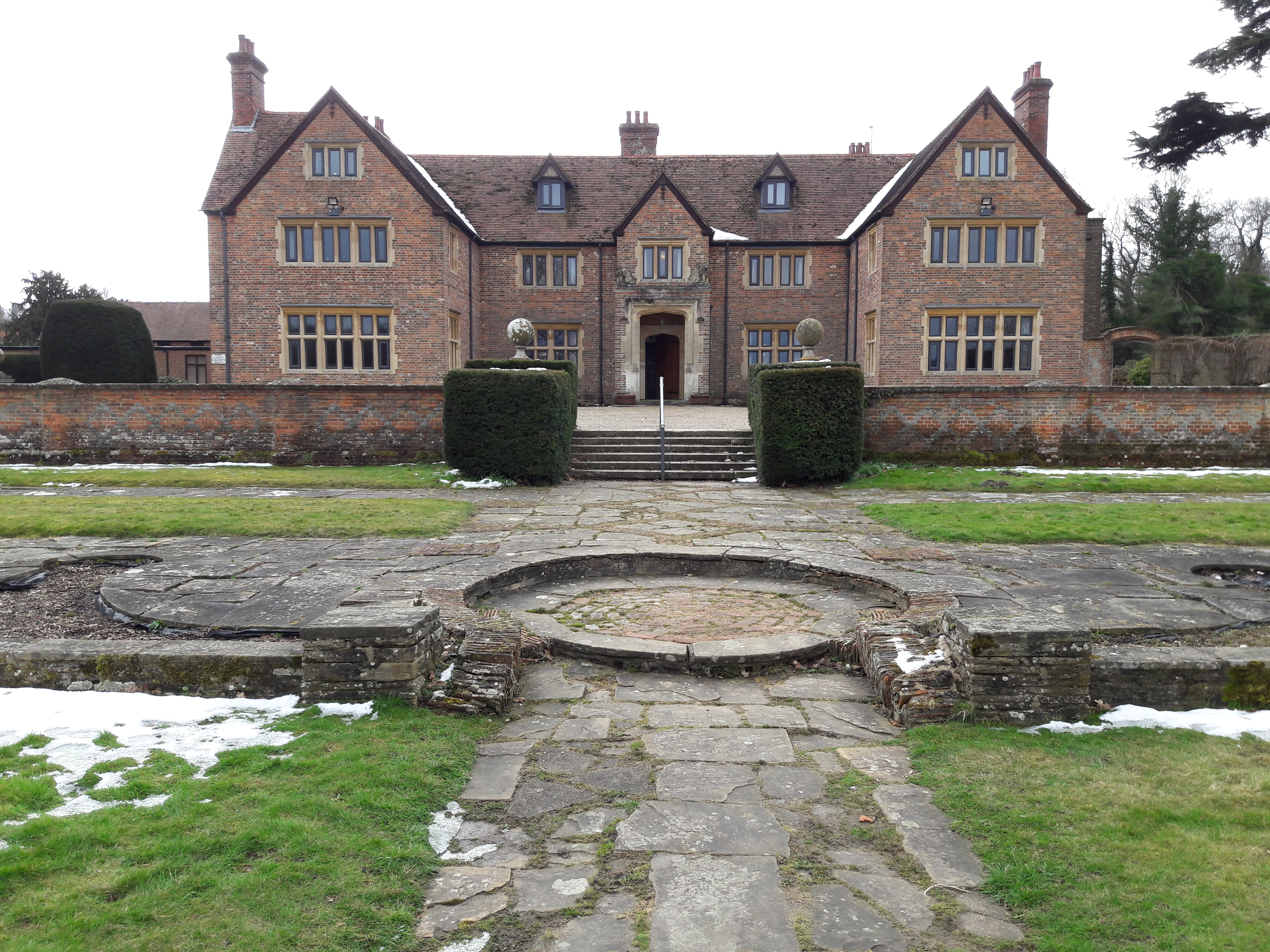
Front of house, March 2018

St Cassian's Centre is a Catholic Youth Retreat Centre in the village of Kintbury in the English county of Berkshire. It is owned and operated by the Ireland, Great Britain and Malta District of the de La Salle brothers.

The centre was set up by three De La Salle Brothers in 1975, Br Damian Lundy FSC, Br Joe Hendron FSC and Br Dominic Green FSC and is housed in a small Manor House (Formerly known as Wallingtons Manor in the south-west of Kintbury town centre, between Inglewood and Titcomb). It is set in picturesque grounds with landscaped gardens and this rural countryside setting offers a quiet atmosphere for those who attend retreats.

== Wallingtons ==
The Manor of Wallingtons in Kintbury dates from the early 13th century. Robert de Wallington purchased the Manor in 1220 and it became named after his family. In the late 15th century, it was purchased by William Waynflete, the Bishop of Winchester. He gave it to his foundation at Magdalen College, Oxford. They remained in possession until 1859, but rented it out to tenants. The present manor house was built in the late 16th century. It was remodeled after a fire in 1784 and again in 1891 by Temple Moore when William Hew Dunn moved there from nearby Inglewood House.

== Rooms in the Centre ==
=== The Quiet Room ===
Evening prayer in the Quiet Room.

This is a room where people can go to be quiet. Situated in part of the attic space of the west wing of the original house, it has space for all those in attendance at the centre. This space allows it to be used for daily reflection, most regularly in the morning after breakfast and in the evening after dinner.

The floor space is lined with cushions for seating and the centrepiece of the room is a sprawling candle holder with many candles. These candles are lit whenever the room is used for reflection.

=== The Cedar Room ===
The Cedar Room is located on the ground floor and is used for gatherings during retreats. The floor is covered with beanbags for seating which can be rearranged depending on what the room is being used for.

The room is so called because its windows overlooks a large cedar tree (colloquially known as Cedric) in the middle of the lawns at the side of the house (see below). Despite this, it is almost universally known as the 'Bean Bag Room'.

=== The De La Salle Room ===
Mainly known as a common room, this room is used by all who visit the centre to relax and socialise during their free time on retreat. This room is located on the first floor of the house.

=== The Damian Lundy Room ===
Named after the founder of the centre, this room is the largest in the house. It is mainly used for functions, retreats and masses.

== Trees - Cedric and Marge ==
There are two prominent trees in the grounds of the centre. These are a large cedar tree known affectionately as Cedric and a coniferous tree named Marge. The team encourage all to give Cedric "hugs" due to him being over 200 years old. Marge stands just behind Cedric; it is named after its resemblance to Marge Simpson's hair-do.

== The Lasallian Young Team ==
The Lasallian Young Team is a group of volunteers who work at the centre for a year. They start in September and finish the following August.

== Grounds ==
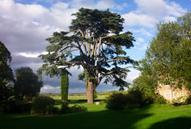
'Cedric' and 'Marge'

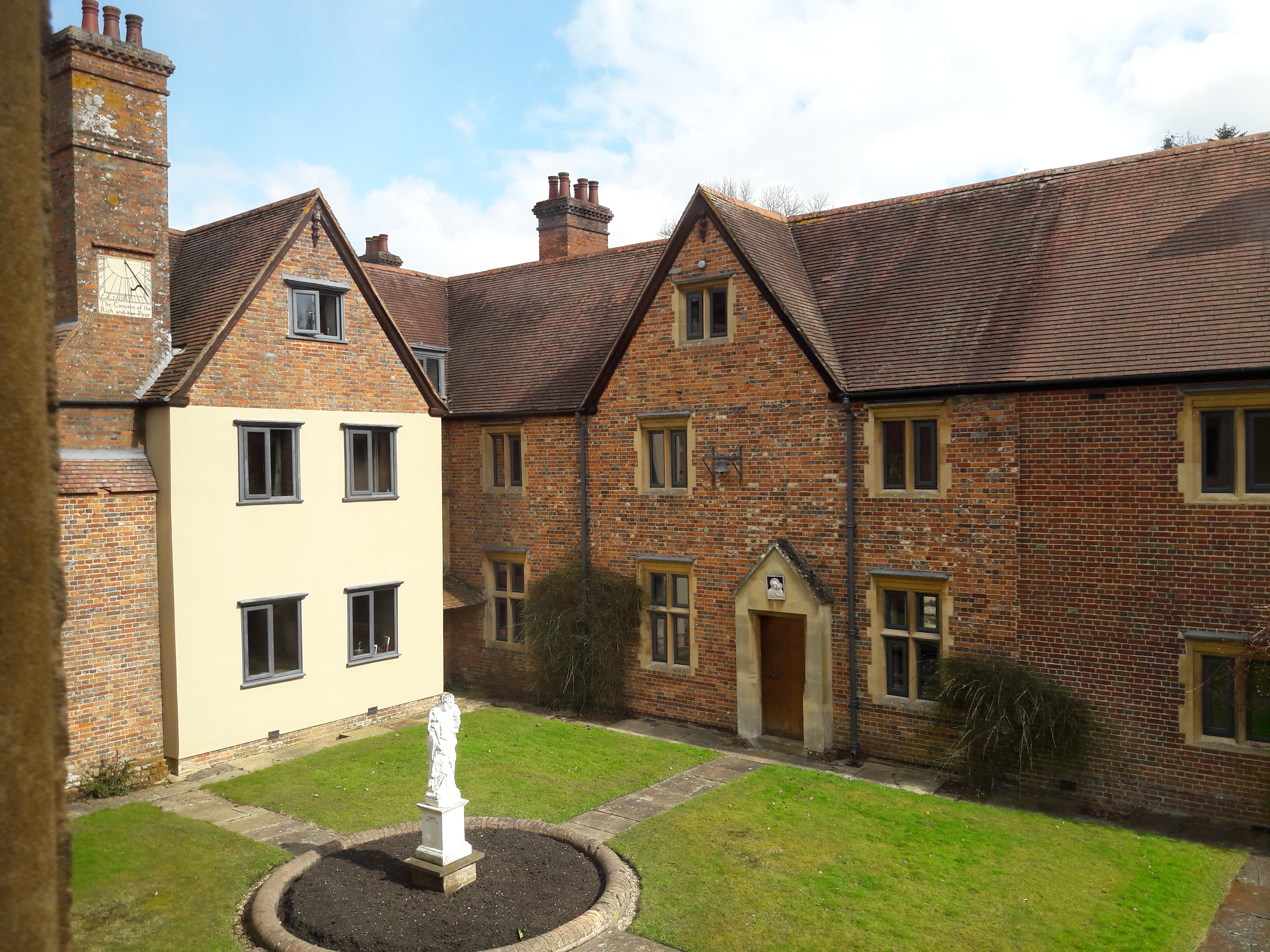
St Joseph's Courtyard

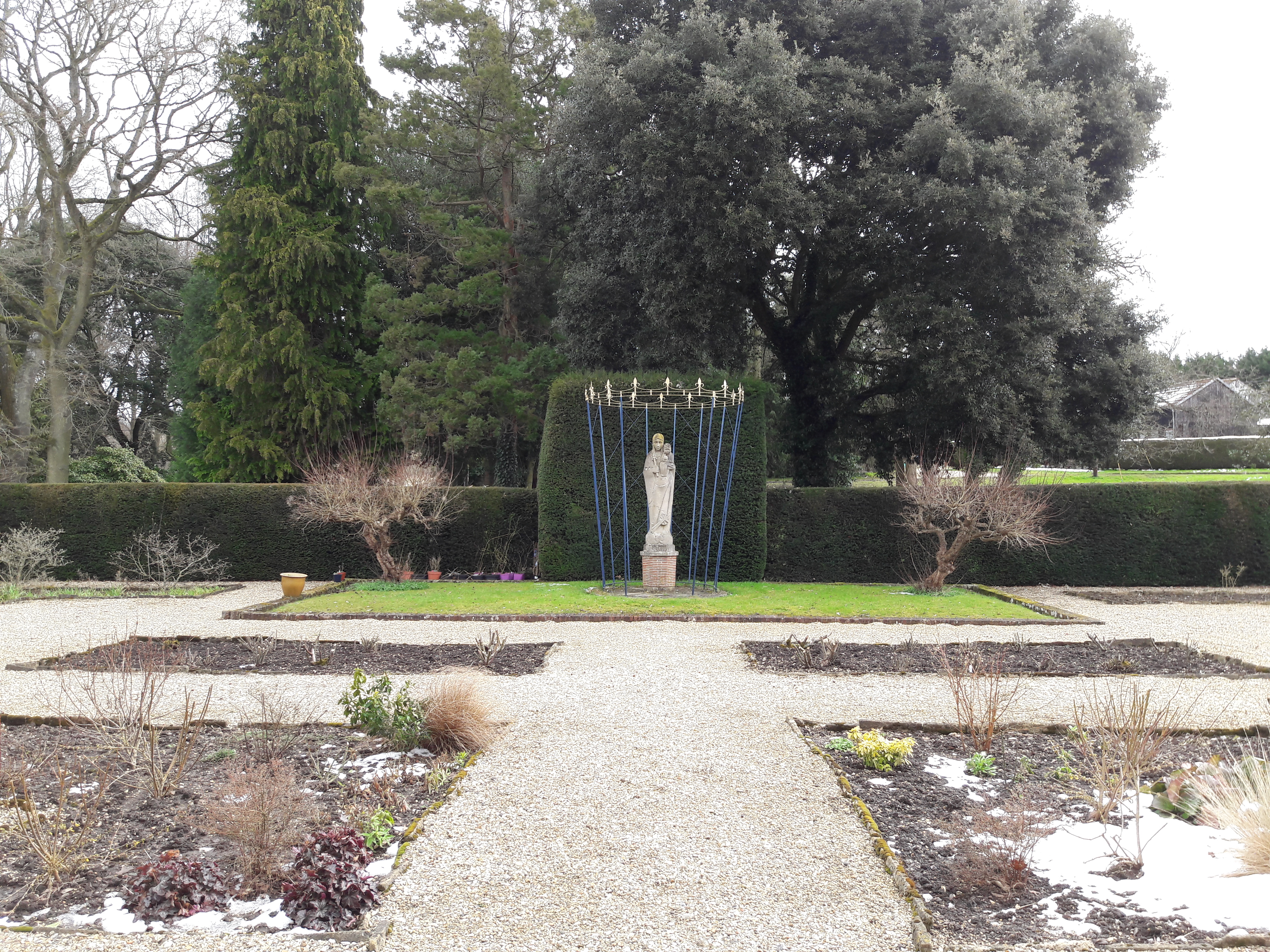
Our Lady's Garden

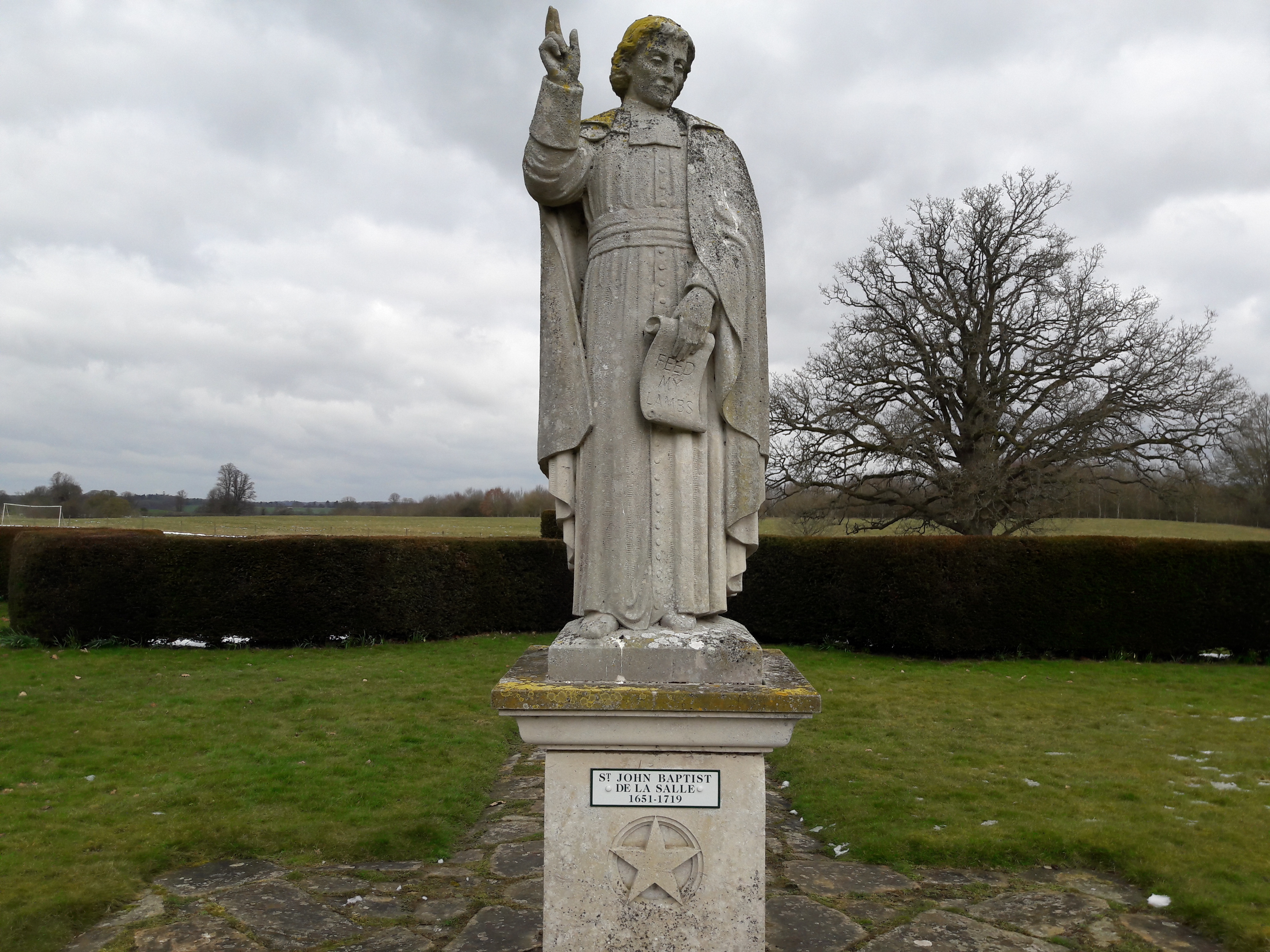
Statue of the founder of the De La Salle Brothers, St John Baptist de La Salle
