= Derwent Island House =

Grade II listed house on Derwent Island, Cumbria, England

Coordinates: 54.5912°N 3.1449°W

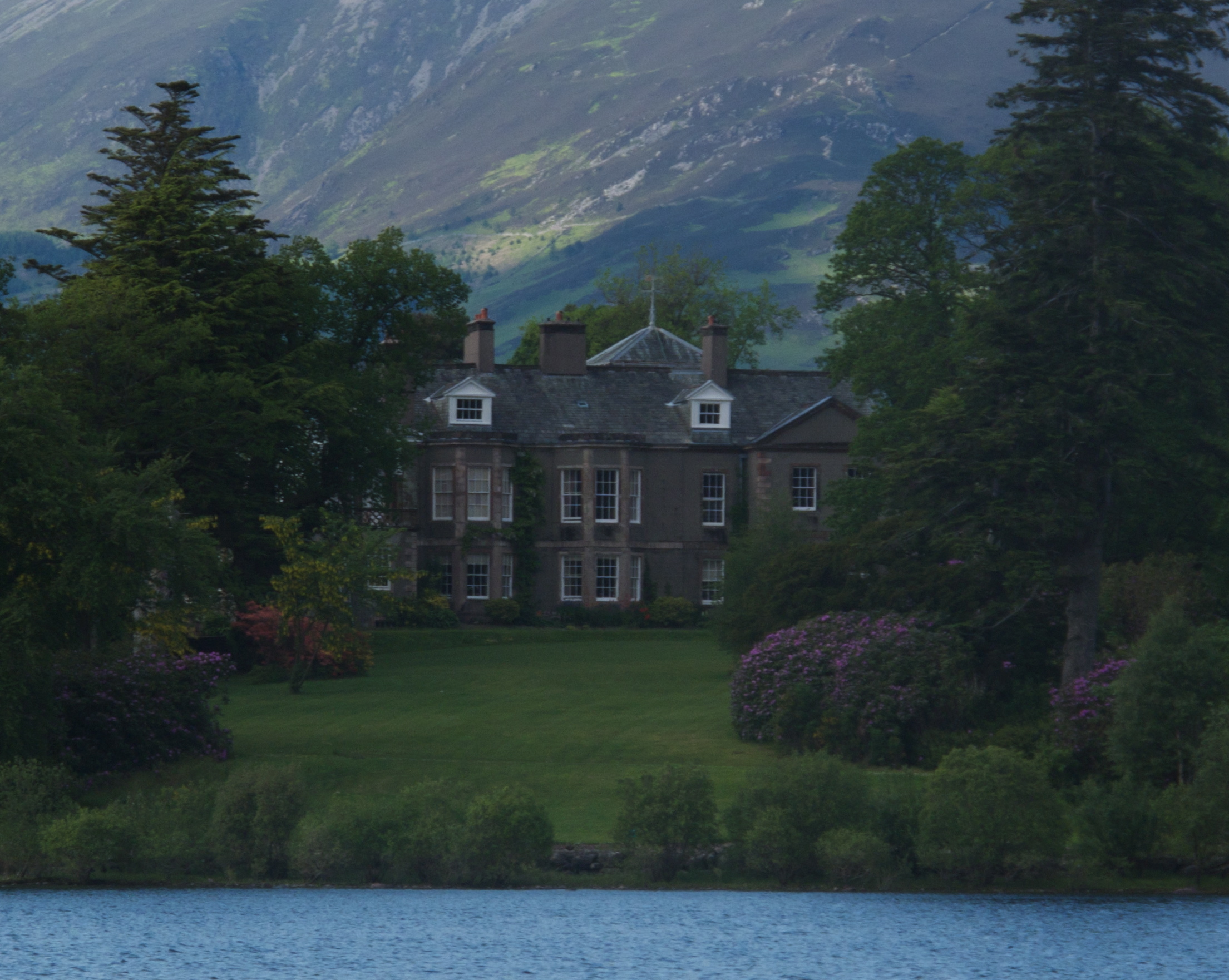
Derwent Island House

Derwent Island House (often called Derwent Isle House) is a Grade II listed 18th-century Italianate house situated on the seven-acre (three-hectare) Derwent Island, Derwent Water, Keswick, Cumbria, and in the ownership of the National Trust. It is leased as a private home, but is open to the public five days a year. The interior is neoclassical in style.

== History ==
Derwent Island was owned by Fountains Abbey and used by monks, but with the dissolution of the monasteries, it became property of the Crown in 1539. In 1569 it was sold to the Company of Mines Royal a subsidiary of a German mining company. The German miners built a camp on the island where they kept animals, grew vegetables and brewed beer.

In 1778 Joseph Pocklington bought the island (then known as Vicar's Island) from Miles Ponsonby for £300. He built a house, boathouse, fort and battery, and Druid circle folly on the land. The house was one of the earliest villas to be built in the Lake District, an entry in Pocklington's notebooks suggests that he saw a house on Belle Isle (in nearby Windermere lake) in 1776, perhaps inspiring his own ambition for a house on a Lake District island. Pocklington held annual regattas on the lake at which he fired off his cannon and the small fort used for mock battles. Pocklington sold the island to William Peachy in 1796, a friend of poet Robert Southey.

Henry Cowper Marshall purchased the island in 1844 and employed architect Anthony Salvin to add east and west wings and a three-storey tower to the house. In 1951, Mr Marshall's grandson Denis Marshall gave the property to the National Trust.

During the 20th century, the house was a summer residence for several members of the Grindlay family who leased it from the Marshalls.

== William Wordsworth ==
William Wordsworth was upset by the building, feeling it spoiled the view, and described Pocklington as "a native of Nottinghamshire, who played strange pranks by his buildings and plantations upon Vicar's Island, in Derwentwater, which his admiration, such as it was, of the country, and probably a wish to be a leader in a new fashion, had tempted him to purchase."

== Gallery ==
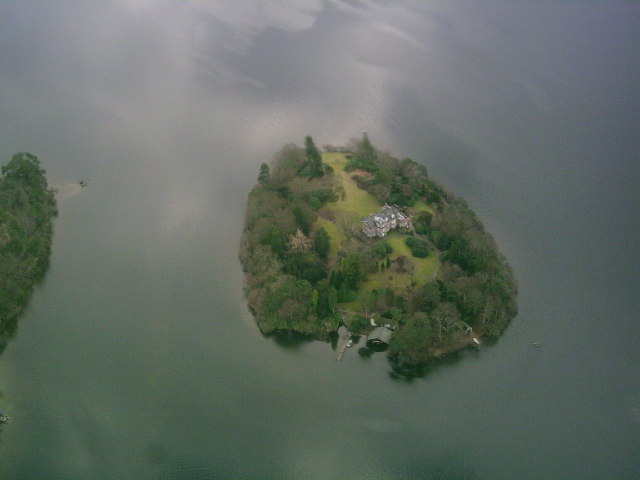
Derwent Island

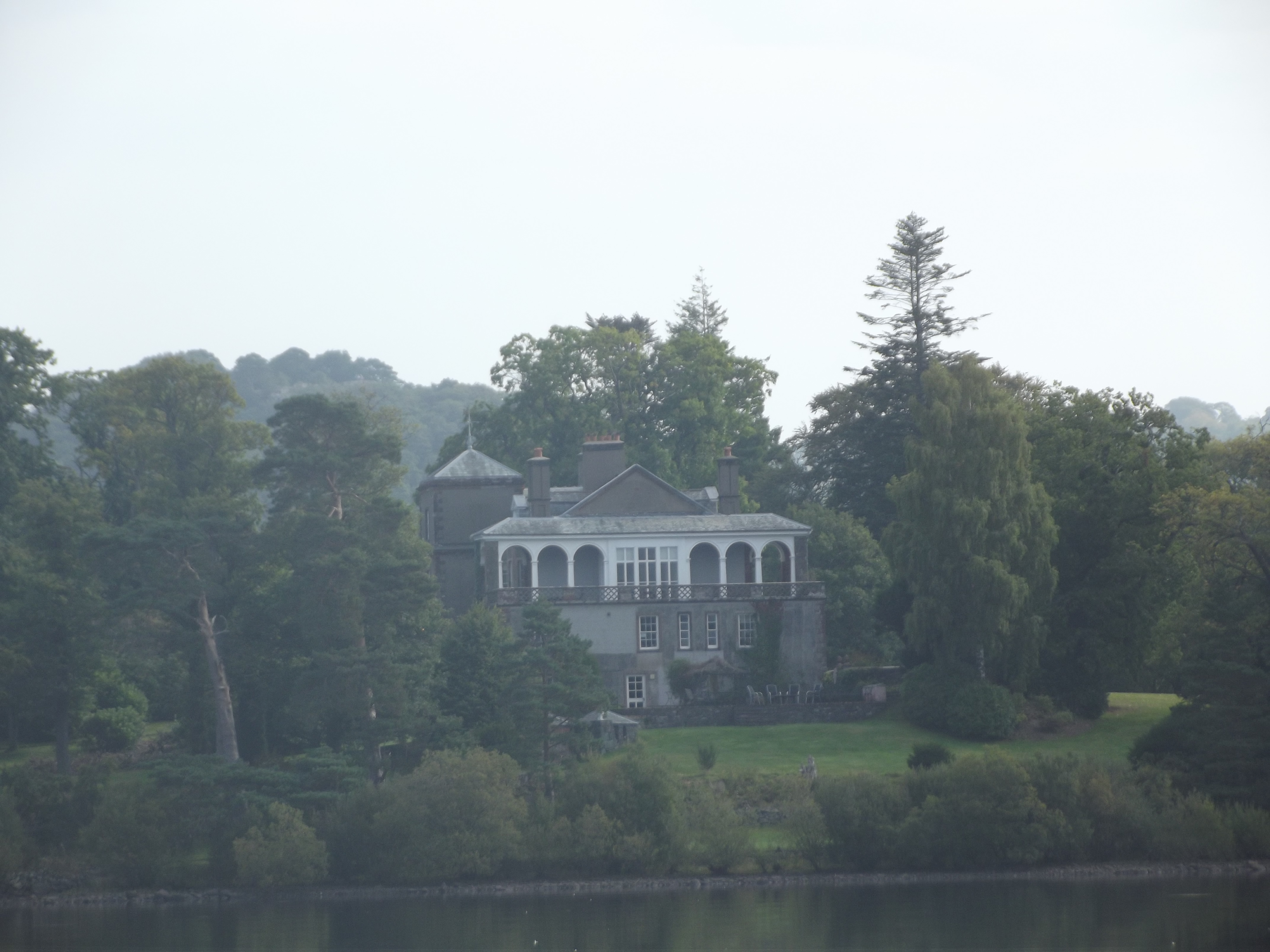
East facing side of Derwent Island House

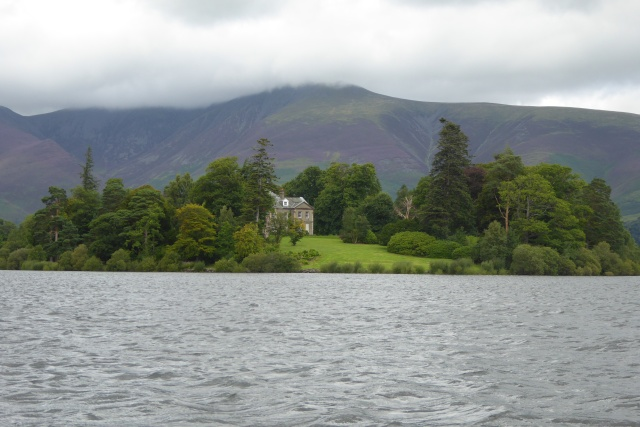
Southern facade

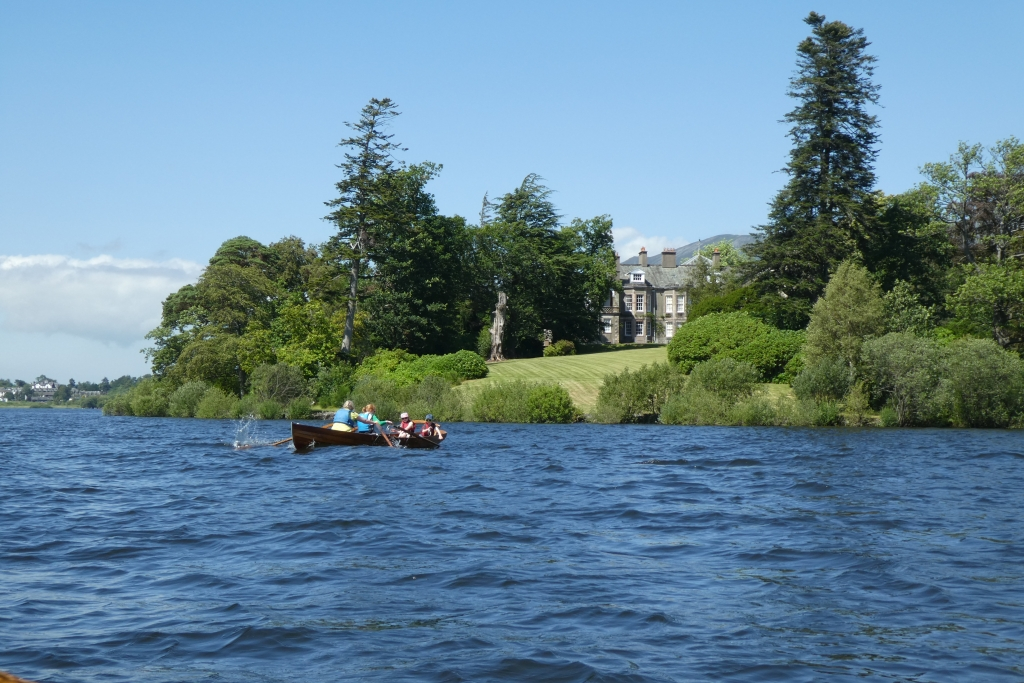
House and lawns

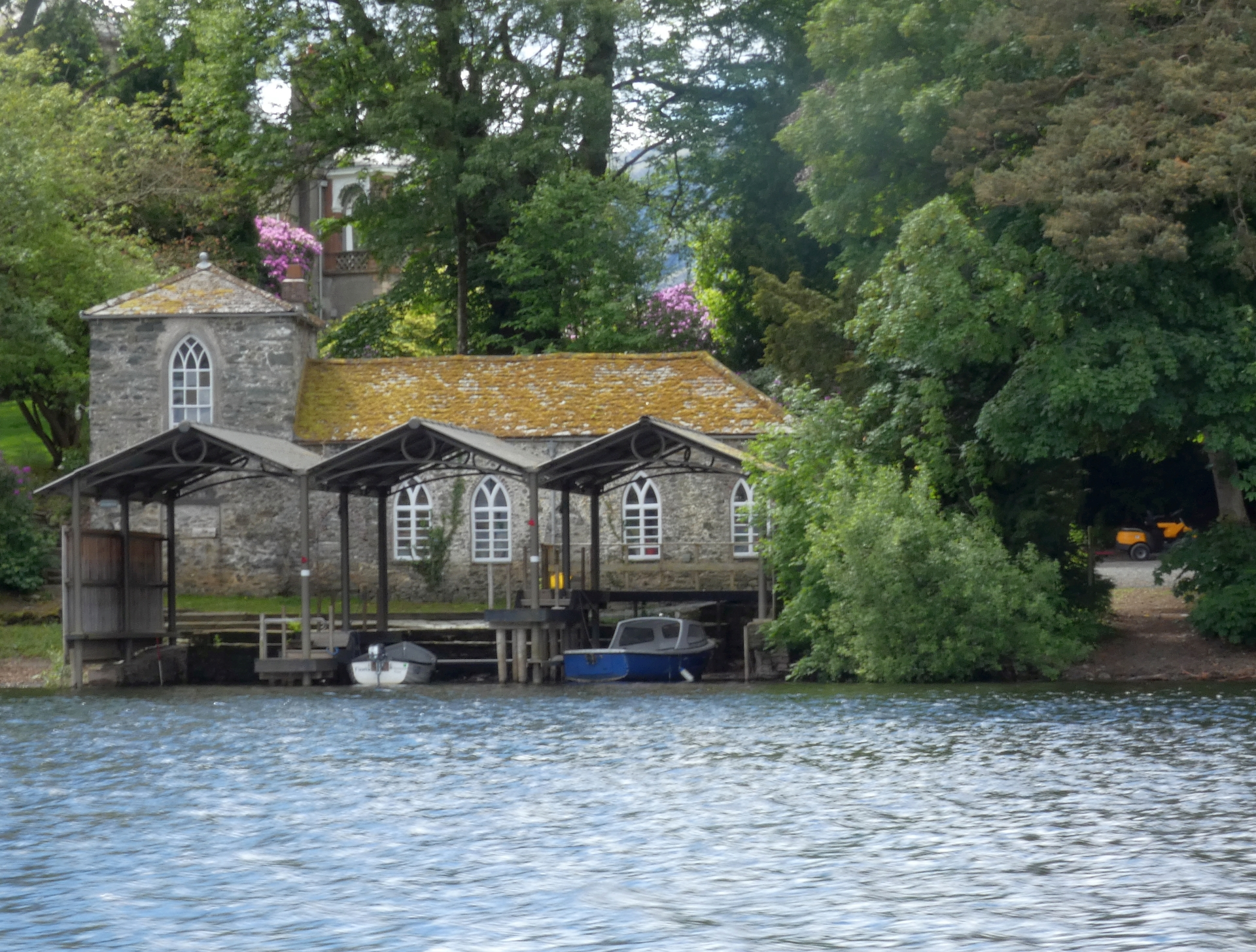
Derwent Isle Old Chapel

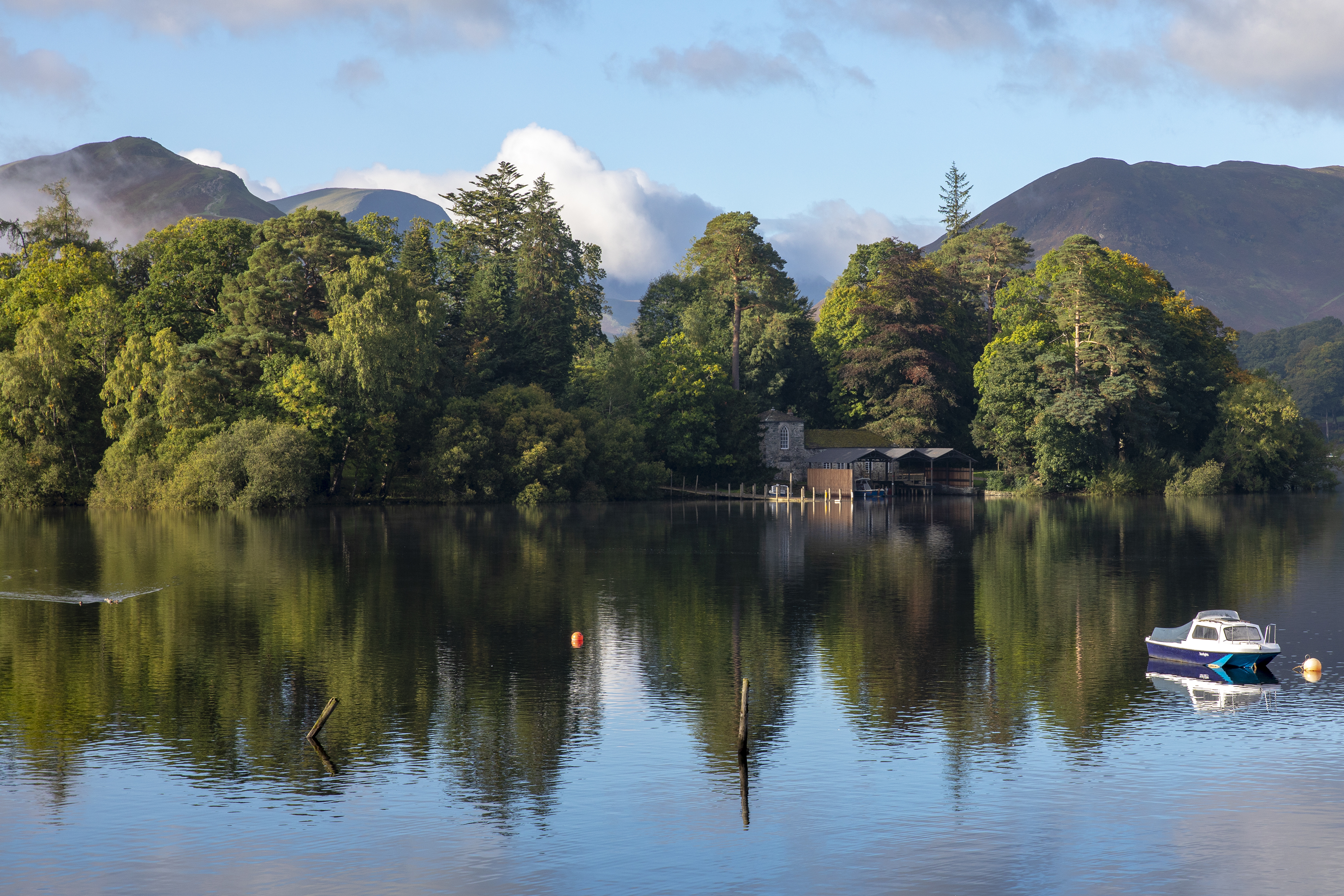
Boathouse and slipway

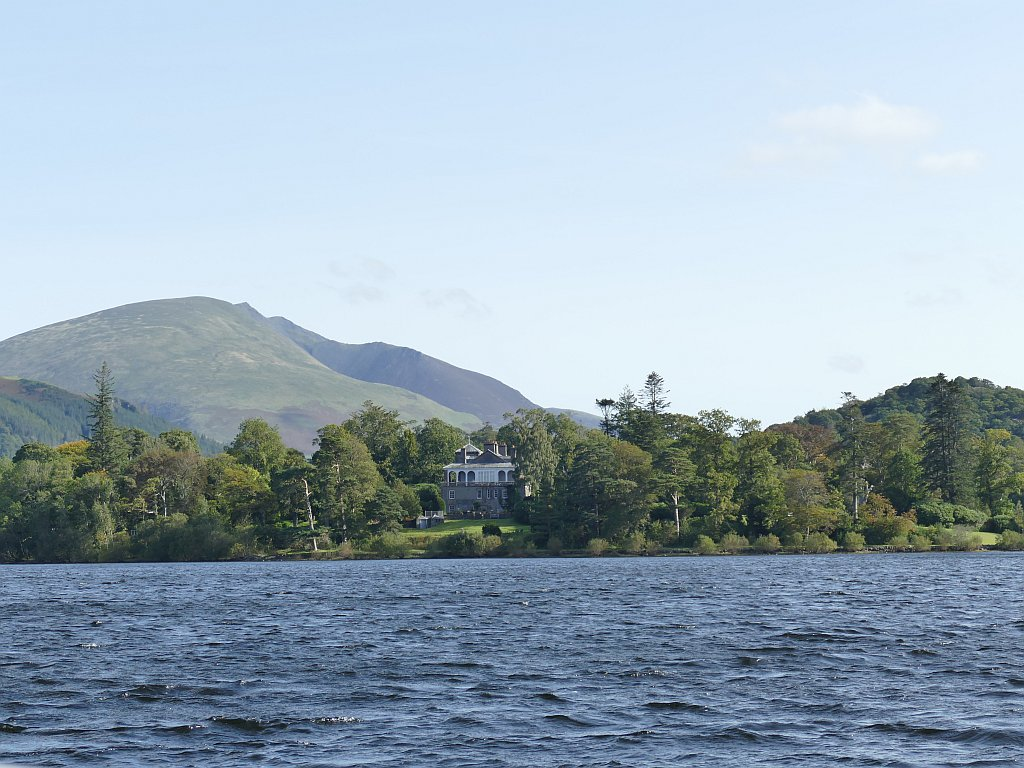
Derwent Island House from Derwent Water

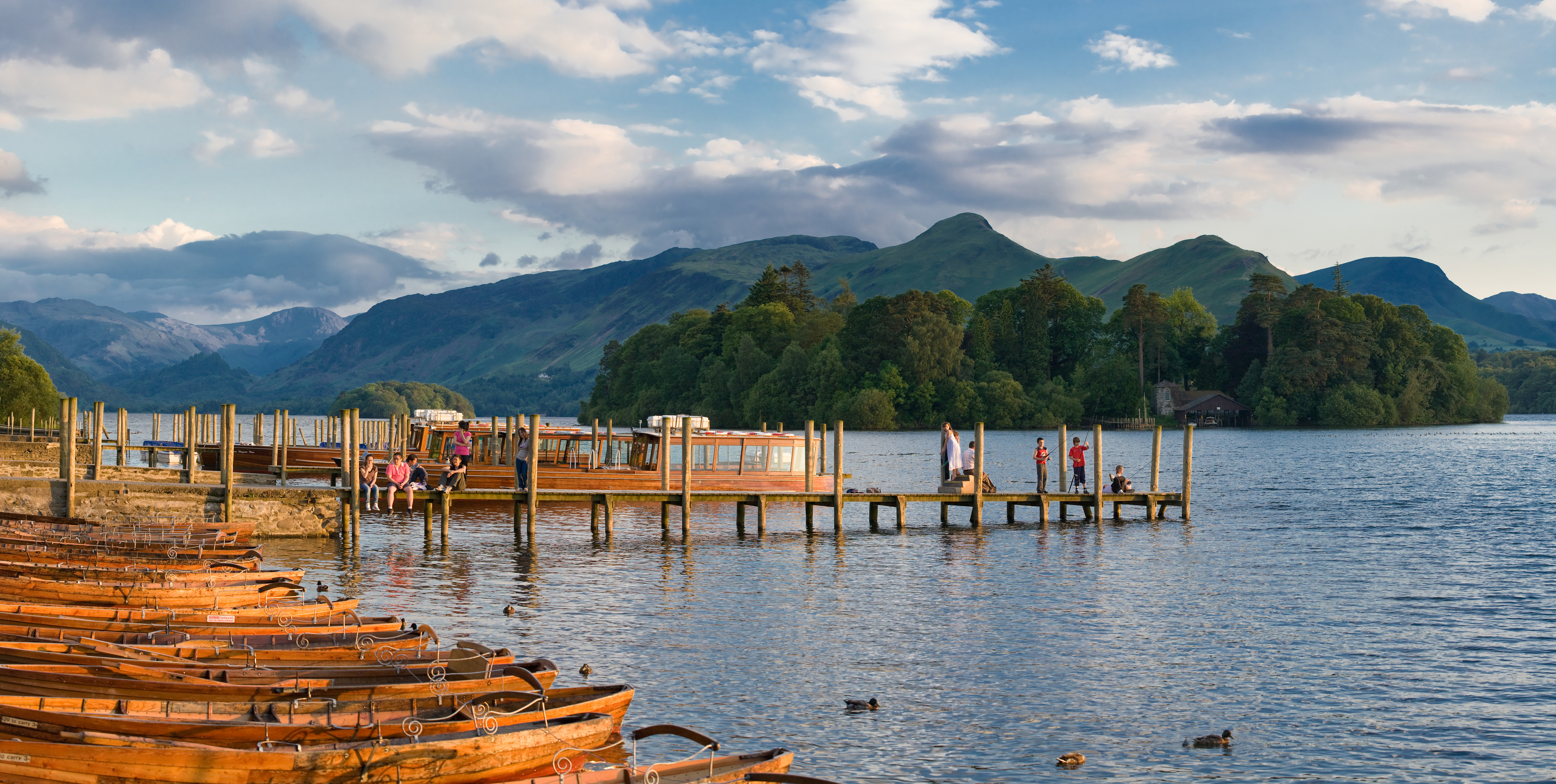
Derwent Island

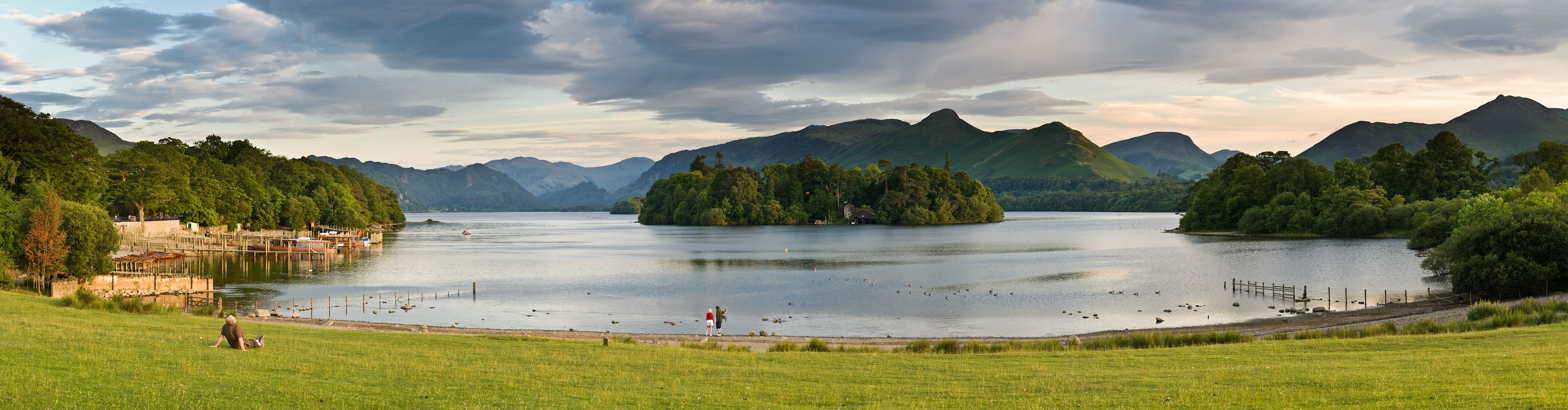
Derwent Island

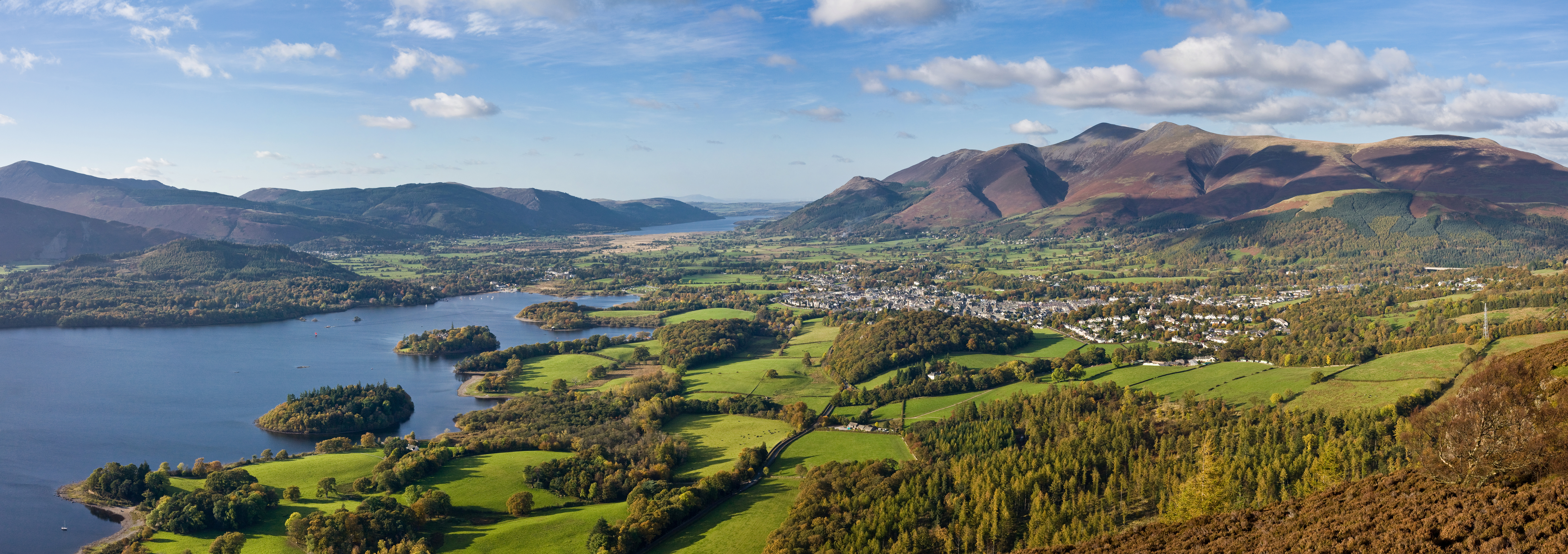
Derwent Water

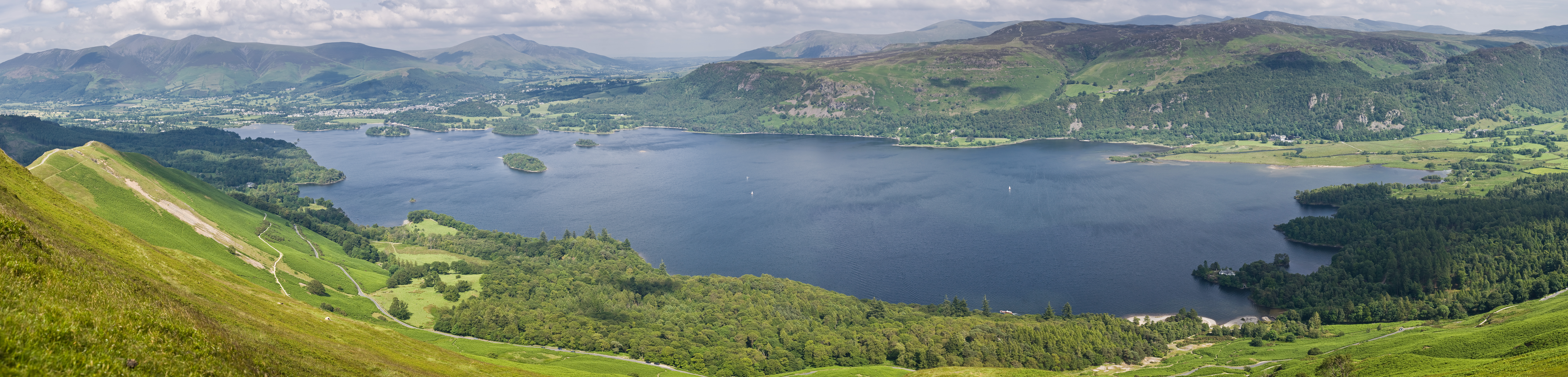
Derwent Water

== See also ==
- Listed buildings in Keswick, Cumbria
