= Elcot, Berkshire =

Coordinates: 51.420675°N 1.430104°W

Elcot
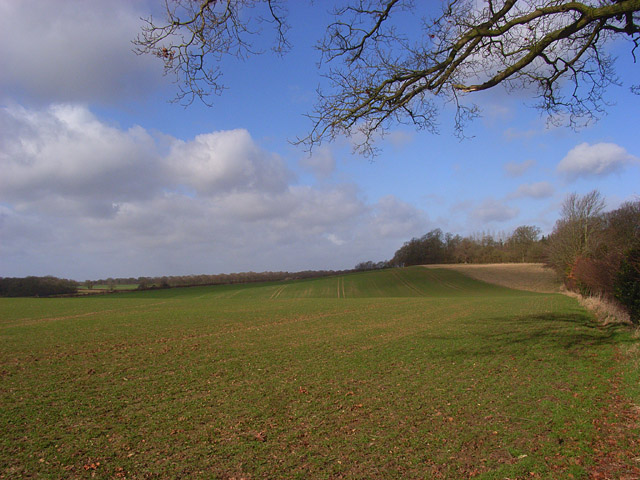
- Fields at Elcot

- Location within Berkshire
- OS grid reference: SU397696
- Civil parish: Kintbury
- Metropolitan borough: West Berkshire
- Metropolitan county: Berkshire
- Region: South East
- Country: England
- Sovereign state: United Kingdom
- Post town: HUNGERFORD
- Postcode district: RG17
- Dialling code: 01488
- Police: Thames Valley
- Fire: Royal Berkshire
- Ambulance: South Central
- UK Parliament: Berkshire

Elcot is a hamlet in Berkshire, England, and part of the civil parish of Kintbury. It is the location of the four-star Elcot Park Hotel.

The settlement lies near to the A4 road, and is located equidistant from both Hungerford and Newbury. It is also close to the hamlet Halfway.
