= Catmore and Winterly Copses =

Site of Special Scientific Interest in Berkshire, England

- Site of Special Scientific Interest
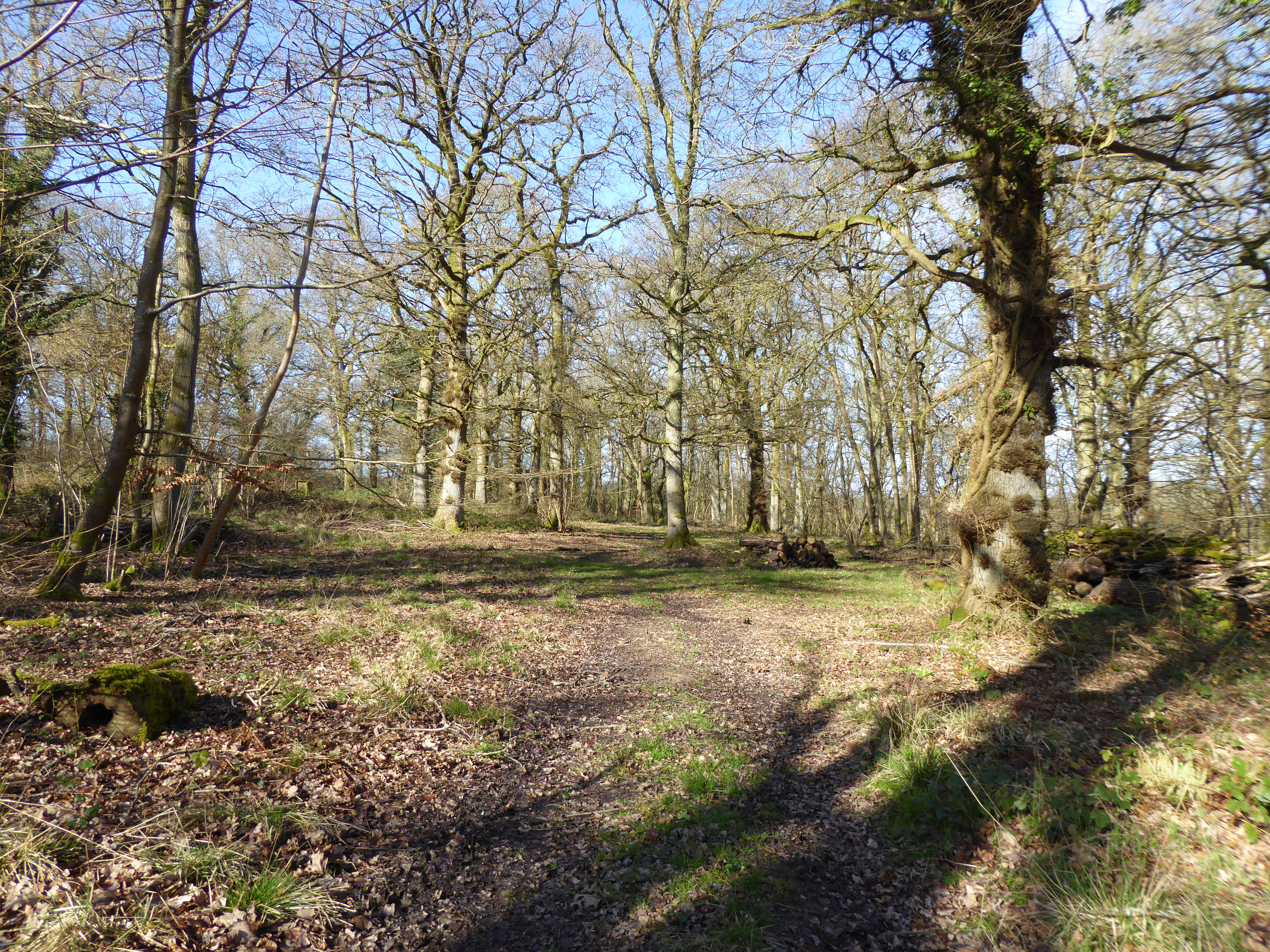
- Catmore Copse

- Location within Berkshire
- Location of Catmore and Winterly Copses.
- Area of search: Berkshire
- Grid reference: SU 375 659
- Coordinates: 51.391°N 1.462°W
- Interest: Biological
- Area: 25.0 hectares (62 acres)
- Notification date: 1984
- Location map: Magic Map

Catmore and Winterly Copses is a 25-hectare (62-acre) biological Site of Special Scientific Interest north-west of Kintbury in Berkshire.

The woods are broadleaved, mixed and yew woodland located in a lowland area.

The site is private land but a public footpath runs through Catmore Copse.

== Flora ==
The site has the following Flora:

=== Trees ===
- Birch
- Fraxinus
- Maple
- Quercus robur
- Hazel
- Alder
- Aspen
- Prunus avium
- sallow
- Malus
- Frangula alnus
- Viburnum opulus
- Prunus spinosa

=== Plants ===
- Carex pallescens
- Geum rivale
- Lathyrus montanus
- Melampyrum pratense
- Valeriana dioica
- Platanthera chlorantha
- Lysimachia nummularia
- Scutellaria galericulata
- Filipendula ulmaria
- Veronica beccabunga
- Polygonum hydropiper
- Rubus fruticosus
- Pteridium aquilinum
- Deschampsia cespitosa
- Mercurialis perennis
- Lamiastrum galeobdolon
- Adoxa moschatellina
- Ajuga reptans
- Oxalis acetosella
- Primula vulgaris
- Luzula pilosa
- Lysimachia nemorum
- Dryopteris dilatata
- Dryopteris felix-mas
- Athyrium filix-femina
- Blechnum spicant
- Carex acutiformis
