= Kintbury =

Coordinates: 51.399°N 1.449°W

- Village and civil parish
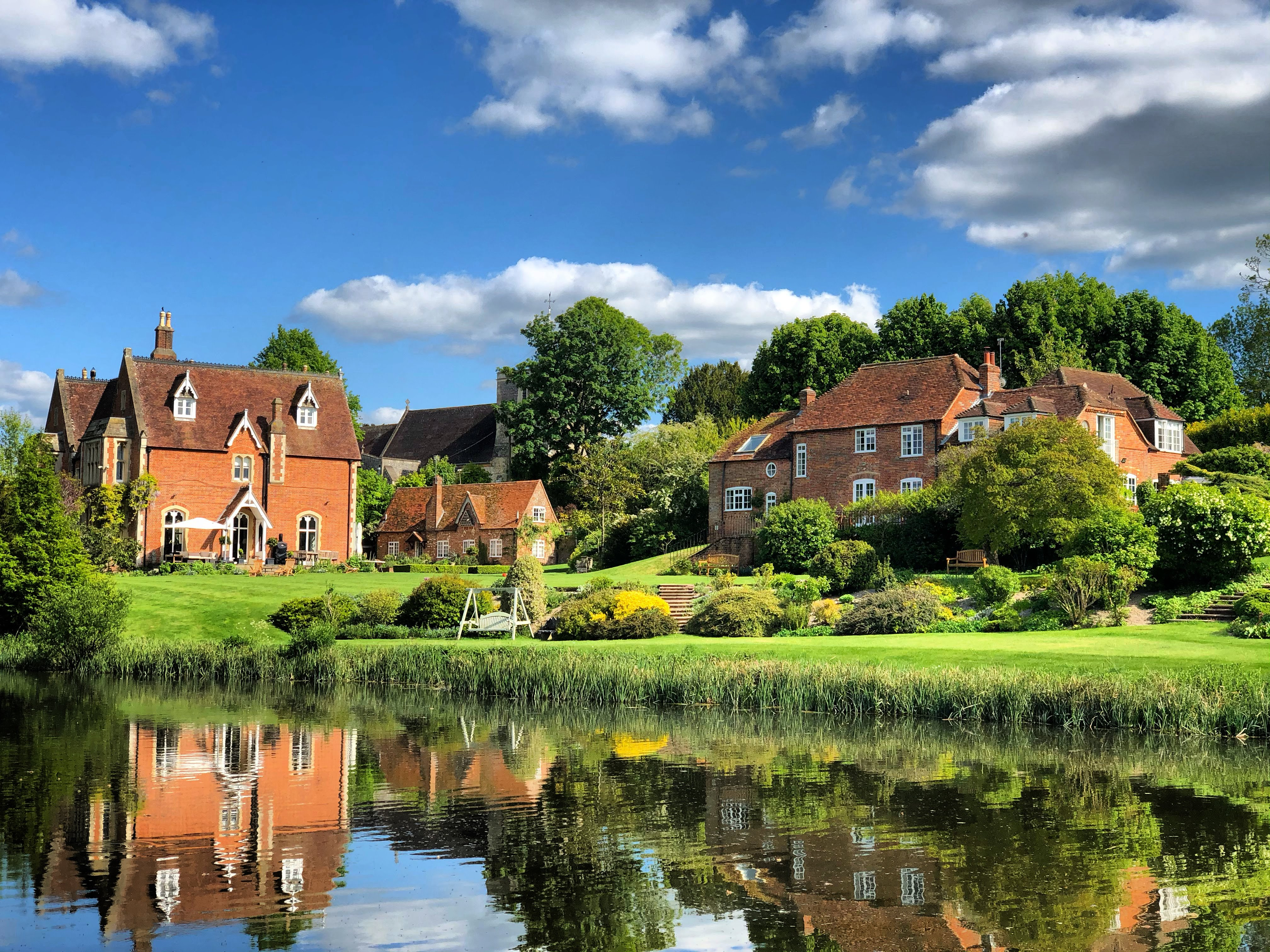
- St. Mary's Church and Houses in Kintbury, view from the canal.

- Location within Berkshire
- Area: 34.92 km^{2} (13.48 sq mi)
- Population: 2,534 (2011 census)
  - Density: 73/km^{2} (190/sq mi)
- OS grid reference: SU3867
- Civil parish: Kintbury
- Unitary authority: West Berkshire
- Ceremonial county: Berkshire
- Region: South East
- Country: England
- Sovereign state: United Kingdom
- Post town: Hungerford
- Postcode district: RG17
- Dialling code: 01488
- Police: Thames Valley
- Fire: Royal Berkshire
- Ambulance: South Central
- UK Parliament: Newbury

Kintbury is a village and civil parish in the West Berkshire district, Berkshire, England, between the towns of Newbury and Hungerford. The village has a convenient railway to Paddington and Reading, proximity to other transport and local cultural destinations, including Roman and Norman sites, and forms part of a very large Area of Outstanding Natural Beauty, the North Wessex Downs which extends from the River Thames at Streatley to West Wiltshire. The parish includes the hamlets of Clapton, Elcot and Winding Wood.

== Amenities ==
Amenities in the village have included the Church of England parish church, primary school, a post office, a corner shop, and a bakery. A Roman Catholic youth retreat and work centre, St Cassian's Centre, is south-west of the village centre, between Inglewood and Titcomb. There are two pubs in the village; The Blue Ball and The Dundas Arms. The village has sports facilities including tennis, bowls and football clubs, as well as an indoor leisure centre. The village has an area of Site of Special Scientific Interest on its south eastern border called Catmore and Winterly Copses. The Village has a Local nature reserve called Kintbury Newt Ponds.

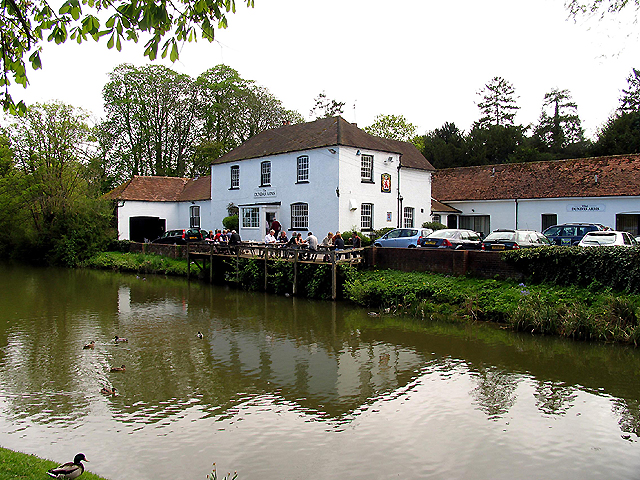
Dundas Arms on the Kennet and Avon Canal

== Points of Interest ==
The village has an area of Site of Special Scientific Interest on its south eastern border called Catmore and Winterly Copses. The Village has a Local nature reserve called Kintbury Newt Ponds.

== Transport ==
Kintbury railway station in the village is served by local services from Reading and Newbury to Bedwyn. The Kennet and Avon Canal runs through the village at Kintbury Lock. A horse drawn widebeam canal boat runs public trips from Kintbury, either towards Newbury or towards Hungerford.

== Sport and leisure ==
The village holds an annual "Ray Boxshall Orienteering Fun Day". An orienteering event named after Ray Boxshall who was heavily involved in running the event in the years before he died. Kintbury has two amateur dramatic societies - The Kintbury Players (who generally perform comedic plays), and St Mary's Drama Group who perform an annual pantomime in the February half term holiday. Kintbury has a Sports and Leisure centre - the Kintbury Jubilee Centre, run by the community for the community, with fitness classes, clubs, and a hall available to hire. The Jubilee Centre has three tennis courts and is home to Kintbury Tennis Club.

Kintbury is also home to Wessex League club Kintbury Rangers F.C., who play at the Recreation Ground. Notable former players include Southampton F.C striker Charlie Austin and former Everton player Brett Angell.

== Notable residents ==
- George Cherry (1822–1887), cricketer and barrister
- Terence Conran lived at Barton Court for many years.
- Robert Harris, author of well-known novels including Fatherland, Enigma and Pompeii
- Anthony Howard, political journalist, attended school there.
- Roger Mortimer (horse racing journalist) spent his final years living in Kintbury.
- Chapman Pincher lived there for many years.
- Sir Gordon Richards, 26 times champion jockey, spent his final years there and is buried there.
- William Winterbourne, hanged at Reading Gaol for his part in the Swing Riots of 1830, buried in the churchyard

== Demography ==
2011 Published Statistics: Population, home ownership and extracts from Physical Environment, surveyed in 2005
Output area	Homes owned outright	Owned with a loan	Socially rented	Privately rented	Other	km^{2} roads	km^{2} water	km^{2} domestic gardens	Usual residents	km^{2}
Civil parish	322	381	168	142	34	0.407	0.428	0.764	2534	34.92
