= Listed buildings in Keswick, Cumbria =

Keswick is a civil parish and a town in the Cumberland unitary authority area of Cumbria, England. It contains 51 listed buildings that are recorded in the National Heritage List for England. Of these, one is listed at Grade I, the highest of the three grades, three are at Grade II*, the middle grade, and the others are at Grade II, the lowest grade. The parish includes the town of Keswick and the surrounding countryside, and part of Derwentwater, including Derwent Isle. Most of the listed buildings are houses, shops and cottages, and associated structures in the town. The other listed buildings include churches, public houses, hotels, bridges, a former Sunday school, a former railway station, a monument, a war memorial, and a former magistrate's court and police station. The listed buildings on Derwent Isle are a large house and a former chapel.

== Key ==
Grade	Criteria
I	Buildings of exceptional interest, sometimes considered to be internationally important
II*	Particularly important buildings of more than special interest
II	Buildings of national importance and special interest

== Buildings ==
Name and location	Photograph	Date	Notes	Grade
St Kentigern's Church; 54.60824°N 3.15134°W		14th century	The church was enlarged in about 1340 and in 1554. It was restored in 1844–46 by George Gilbert Scott, and further work was carried out in 1889 by C. J. Ferguson and in 1915. The church is in stone with slate roofs, and is mainly in Perpendicular style. It consists of a long nave and chancel under one roof, with a clerestory. There are north and south aisles, a south porch, and a west tower. The tower is in three stages, and has diagonal buttresses, a west doorway, a south clock face, a southwest turret rising to a greater height, and an embattled parapet.	II*
George Hotel; 54.60022°N 3.13600°W		16th century	The hotel was altered later, and is in Georgian style. It is stuccoed, with quoins, and it has three storeys. The main part has three bays, there are three more bays to the right, and a further bay at the right end. The main doorway is round-headed with pilasters and a fanlight containing Gothic tracery. The windows are sashes with architraves.	II
3–6 High Hill; 54.60423°N 3.14432°W		17th century	A row of four roughcast stone houses with a stone roof. They have two storeys, and most of the windows are modern replacements. No. 4 has a two-storey gabled porch with stone benches inside, and No. 5 has old sash windows.	II
Ivy Cottage; 54.60415°N 3.14405°W	—	17th century	The cottage is in roughcast stone and it has a stone roof. The entrance front is gabled, it has two storeys, and contains a modern porch, and there is a modern window in each floor. The front facing the road has one storey and contains a dormer window.	II
Packhorse Inn and former stables 54.60080°N 3.13619°W		17th century (possible)	A pebbledashed public house in three storeys and two bays. It has a round-headed doorway with a fanlight, imposts, and a keystone. The windows are sashes with architraves. To the left is a two-storey wing, and to the left of that is a row of former stables.	II
18 High Hill; 54.60479°N 3.14513°W		Early 18th century	A cottage with a slate-hung front and a slate roof. It has two storeys and a symmetrical front of two bays. The central doorway has a panelled door and a wooden porch, and the window are sashes.	II
123 and 125 Main Street; 54.60263°N 3.14139°W		Early 18th century	A pair of mirrored houses in roughcast stone, with quoins, and moulded eaves. They have three storeys and each house has three bays. In the centre of each is a Tuscan doorcase with pilasters, a frieze and a cornice. In the inner bay is a canted bay window, and the other windows are sashes.	II
10–15 Borrowdale Road; 54.59834°N 3.13612°W	—	18th century	A row of six stone cottages in three steps rising up a hill, some of which are roughcast. All are in two storeys, and have stone roofs. The windows are sashes.	II
4 and 6 Derwent Street; 54.59923°N 3.13598°W		18th century	A pair of roughcast stone houses with a slate roof in two storeys. Each house has a single bay, and one sash window in an architrave on each floor. The doorways are approached by steps, and they also have architraves.	II
85–91 Main Street; 54.60194°N 3.14002°W		18th century	A row of three stuccoed properties. The central one (No. 89) has three storeys and three bays, each bay having a gable with bargeboards and a finial. In the centre is a doorway with fluted Doric columns, a frieze, and a cornice. To the left is a shop window and the other windows are sashes. This building is flanked on each side by a two-storey shop with a shop window on the ground floor and sash windows above.	II
Bank Tavern; 54.60139°N 3.13849°W		18th century	The public house is roughcast with a slate roof, in two storeys and four bays. The doorway has a moulded surround with a hood mould, and the windows are sashes.	II
Dog and Gun Public House; 54.60023°N 3.13674°W		18th century	A stuccoed public house with quoins, and in three storeys. The windows are sashes.	II
Chestnut Hill House, Shelley Cottage, stables and coach-house 54.60198°N 3.11666°W	—	Late 18th century	Two roughcast stone houses in two storeys with a long irregular plan. It contains sash windows with stone sills and lintels, and a two-storey bay window. To the north are a stone rubble stable and coach house with sandstone quoins, a coach entrance with a segmental brick arch, doorways, loft doors, and ventilation slits.	II
17–23 St John's Street; 54.59957°N 3.13470°W		Late 18th century	A row of four stone cottages, some roughcast, some stuccoed, with a slate roof. They have two storeys and contain sash windows. The doorways have panelled reveals, and No. 23 has a wooden porch. There is a yard entry to the left of No. 17. At the rear of No. 23 is a curved bay.	II
36–50 St John's Street; 54.59938°N 3.13487°W	—	Late 18th century	A row of stone cottages, stuccoed or roughcast, in late Georgian style, all with two storeys. No. 38 has a pedimented doorcase, No. 40 has a bow window, and No. 42 has two shop windows. The other windows are sashes.	II
Central Hotel; 54.60075°N 3.13688°W	—	Late 18th century	The hotel is pebbledashed and has three storeys. There is a central doorway with a panelled door and a fanlight. On each floor are two sash windows with architraves.	II
Crosthwaite Vicarage; 54.60765°N 3.14525°W	—	Late 18th century	The vicarage is in roughcast stone with quoins and a slate roof. There are two storeys and five bays. The doorway is in Tuscan style, with a porch and a round-arched fanlight. The windows are sashes in architraves; one of the windows on the ground floor has a round head, and there are two Venetian windows.	II
Heads House; 54.60181°N 3.13953°W	—	Late 18th century	A roughcast shop with a moulded cornice, quoins, and dormer windows. It has three storeys and two bays, and contains a modern shop front, and sash windows in the upper floors.	II
Oddfellows Arms Public House; 54.60068°N 3.13739°W		Late 18th century	The public house is in pebbledashed stone, and has three storeys and two bays. In the ground floor is a yard entry to the right, a double sash window in the centre, and a round-arched doorway to the left. In each of the upper floors are two double sash windows in architraves.	II
Royal Oak Hotel; 54.60050°N 3.13625°W		Late 18th century	The hotel was extended in a different style in 1909. The original part on Main Street has three storeys and seven bays; the ground floor is stuccoed and the upper floors are pebbledashed. It contains quoins, string courses, two entrances with architraves with Gibbs surrounds, and sash windows. The extension on Station Street, also with three storeys, has a slate ground floor and is roughcast above. It contains canted oriel windows, shaped gables, a doorway with a curved hood, and most of the other windows are casements with mullions and transoms.	II
Toll Bar Cottage; 54.59913°N 3.11872°W	—	Late 18th century	The cottage is in stone and slate and it has a slate roof. Built on a sloping site, it has one and two storeys. There is a polygonal two-storey projection with a pyramidal roof that contains a blocked round-headed window with a small window above. The other windows are casements. Flanking the projection are single-storey wings with catslide roofs.	II
Greta House; 54.60391°N 3.13901°W		1799–1800	A former country house in three storeys and three bays with quoins and a plinth. The doorway has fluted Ionic three-quarter columns, a frieze, a cornice, and a dentilled pediment. The windows are sashes in architraves. On each side are Venetian windows and beyond are two-story segmental bows. The house was the residence of Samuel Taylor Coleridge and Robert Southey; it has since been converted into self-catering and bed and breakfast accommodation.	I
Moot Hall; 54.60072°N 3.13712°W		1813	The moot hall is in stone and slate with stone dressings and quoins. At the north end is a square tower. In its lower stage is a round-headed doorway approached by a double flight of steps with wrought iron railings. The upper stage contains half-moon windows, clock faces and blind round windows, and round-headed windows. At the top is a cornice, a pagoda roof, and a weathervane. The body of the hall has two storeys, with three open arches in the lower floor, and three round-arched windows above.	II*
Forge Bridge; 54.60556°N 3.11622°W	—	1817	The bridge carries a narrow roadway over the River Greta. It is in stone, and consists of a single segmental arch with solid parapets.	II
3 Penrith Road; 54.60116°N 3.13411°W	—	Early 19th century	A stuccoed house with a slate roof in two storeys. It has a panelled door, a segmental-arched entry, and two sash windows in architraves on each floor.	II
6–12 Police Station Court; 54.60080°N 3.13861°W	—	Early 19th century	A row of seven cottages in rubble stone, with large quoins and Lakeland slate roofs. They have two storeys and each cottage has one bay. The doorways have slate lintels, as do the windows, which are sashes in wooden architraves with slate sills. In front of the cottages are stone doorslabs and cobbled forecourts. At the rear are horizontally sliding sash windows and modern extensions.	II
Brigham Forge Cottages; 54.60562°N 3.11588°W	—	Early 19th century (probable)	A row of roughcast stone cottages with two storeys facing the road and three at the rear. The windows are a mix of sashes, casements, and fixed windows. A flight of external steps lead to the upper storey. The cottage to the left is slightly higher, and beyond that is a larger two-storey house.	II
County Hotel; 54.60110°N 3.13445°W	—	Early 19th century	The hotel is in stuccoed stone with quoins and a slate roof. It has three storeys and six bays. There is a Roman Doric porch with two columns, pilasters, and a cornice. The windows are sashes. To the left is a taller former separate building, later incorporated into the hotel, with three storeys and two bays. It has a doorway with a cornice, a two-storey canted bay window, and dormer windows.	II
Derwent Isle House; 54.59119°N 3.14487°W		Early 19th century	A large stone house in Italianate style in two storeys, with quoins, a cornice and a slate roof. It contains a loggia and a roof terrace. There is a three-stage square tower with a round-arched entrance, and two two-storey bay windows.	II
King's Arms Hotel and 21–25 Main Street; 54.60080°N 3.13754°W		Early 19th century	Three shops and a public house in stuccoed stone, and with three storeys. No. 21 has a recessed ground floor with a frieze and a cornice, and round columns supporting the upper floors. Nos. 23 and 25 have Victorian shop fronts in the ground floor with eleven round arches and a cornice, and sash windows above. The hotel has a panelled door and it also has sash windows.	II
Old Chapel, Derwent Island; 54.59209°N 3.14458°W		Early 19th century (probable)	The former chapel is in stone rubble, and has a square tower that has a brick doorway with a pointed arch and a Gothic window. There is also a low wing with four Gothic windows.	II
Priorholm Hotel; 54.59844°N 3.13617°W	—	Early 19th century	A pebbledashed house in two storeys with cellars and with two bays. In the right bay is a protruding porch with Tuscan columns, a frieze, and a cornice. The windows on the front are sash window, there is a dormer in the roof, and at the rear is a round-headed staircase window.	II
Skiddaw Cottage; 54.60852°N 3.14367°W	—	Early 19th century	A roughcast house with two storeys and three bays. In the centre is a doorway with a moulded surround and a rectangular fanlight. This is flanked by segmental bay windows, each containing three sashes, and with conical roofs. The windows in the upper floor are sashes in moulded surrounds.	II
Crosthwaite Sunday School; 54.60491°N 3.14476°W		1833	The former Sunday school is in mixed stone rubble and slate, and it has a slate roof. It is in a single storey, and has corner buttresses, sash windows in sandstone architraves, and a gabled porch containing a doorway with a pointed head and an inscription in the spandrel.	II
Oak Lodge and Oak Cottage; 54.59821°N 3.13265°W	—	1835	A pair of stuccoed houses with a hipped roof, in two storeys and six bays. The building contains a two-storey canted bay window.	II
St John's Church; 54.59851°N 3.13465°W		1836–38	The church, by Anthony Salvin is in Geometrical style, and built in pink sandstone with slate roofs. The north aisle was added in 1862, the south aisle in 1882, and the chancel was lengthened in 1889. The church consists of a nave and chancel under one roof, aisles, porches at the northwest and southeast, a chancel, an octagonal south vestry with a pyramidal roof, and a west steeple. The steeple has a three-stage tower with angle buttresses, a west doorway, a polygonal west turret, and a broach spire. On the angles of the nave and chancel are pinnacles.	II*
25 St John's Street; 54.59942°N 3.13450°W		c. 1840	A house in stone and slate with quoins, a cornice, and a slate roof. There are two storeys and three bays. The central doorway has pilasters, a rectangular fanlight, Greek key moulding, a frieze, and a cornice. The windows are sashes. On the right return is a two-storey canted bay window.	II
Calvert's Bridge; 54.60443°N 3.12486°W		19th century (possible)	The bridge carries a narrow roadway over the River Greta. It is in stone, and consists of a single segmental arch with solid parapets.	II
Castlerigg Manor; 54.59770°N 3.12606°W		19th century	A large house, later used as a youth centre. It is in slate and stone rubble, with two storeys and it has an irregular plan. At the east end is a four-stage tower surmounted by shaped gables. Other features include ashlar quoins and a plinth, gables with bargeboards in different designs, bay windows, and a gabled porch with a Tudor arched doorway. Some of the windows are mullioned, and others are casements in architraves.	II
Castlerigg Manor Lodge; 54.59752°N 3.12503°W	—	Mid 19th century	The lodge is in stone and slate rubble with a slate roof. It is in a single storey and has a cruciform plan. The lodge has gables with elaborate bargeboards, casement windows with pointed heads, quoins, and ornamental pinnacles.	II
Keswick railway station 54.60374°N 3.13060°W		1865	The station was built for the Cockermouth, Keswick and Penrith Railway, and closed in 1972. The station building is in Lakeland stone with sandstone dressings and a green slate roof. At the entrance are two gabled wings containing sash windows, with a canopy and a half-dormer between them. On the platform side are three gables and a large glass canopy carried on iron columns and arches with tracery in the spandrels. The platform has stone paving.	II
Balustrading, urns, and terrace wall, Castlerigg Manor; 54.59799°N 3.12607°W	—	Late 19th century	The garden terrace to the north of the house has balustrading in Classical style, and it contains round arches with shell motifs, square piers, urns, and a double staircase. On the garden side is a frieze with putti and swags, and at the west end is a round bastion.	II
2 Eskin Street; 54.59842°N 3.13139°W		c. 1875	A house in slate rubble with dressings in sandstone and brick, and a Lakeland slate roof. There are three storeys and three bays, and the gable end faces the road. On the front is a canted porch with a gabled roof. All the windows are round-headed sashes with surrounding decorative stonework. The roof has decorative wooden brackets.	II
4 and 6 Eskin Street; 54.59849°N 3.13138°W		c. 1875	A pair of mirrored houses in slate rubble with dressings in sandstone and brick, and a hipped Lakeland slate roof. They have three storeys and the two houses share three bays. The central round-headed doorways are paired and have fanlights, and are flanked by two-storey canted bay windows. The other windows are round-headed sashes with surrounding decorative stonework. The roof has decorative wooden brackets, and No. 4 has a gabled dormer.	II
8 and 10 Eskin Street; 54.59860°N 3.13136°W		c. 1875	A pair of mirrored houses in slate rubble with dressings in sandstone and brick, and a hipped Lakeland slate roof. They have two storeys with attics, and the two houses share three bays. The central round-headed doorways are paired and have fanlights, and are flanked by single-storey canted bay windows. The other windows are round-headed sashes with surrounding decorative stonework. The roof has decorative wooden brackets, and there is a paired dormer in the centre of the roof.	II
Keswick Industrial Arts; 54.60346°N 3.14307°W		1893–94	The arts centre, later converted into a restaurant, is in stone with Westmorland slate roofs. It was designed by Paley, Austin and Paley in local vernacular style. It has two storeys with attics and a rear single-storey extension giving an L-shaped plan. The left four bays of the front have a wooden verandah in the upper floor, and between the floors is a painted wooden inscription. To the right are two gabled bays with a canted bay window in the upper floor.	II
Ruskin Monument; 54.59033°N 3.14098°W		1900	The memorial is to John Ruskin, and consists of a vertical slab of slate. This is inscribed on two sides, and on the side facing Derwentwater is a roundel containing a bust in relief. The lettering is in Art nouveau style, and it includes quotations from Ruskin's works.	II
Mayson's Shop; 54.59903°N 3.13691°W		c. 1900 (probable)	The shop has two storeys and three bays with pilasters. The entrance is recessed, and is flanked by two-light shop windows, and in the upper floor are three three-light sash windows. The shop has a truncated pyramidal roof in slate, with a decorated ridge and finials. It is flanked by single storey extensions, of one bay to the left with a pedimental panel, and three bays to the right with a three-panel parapet.	II
Police station and Magistrates Court; 54.60189°N 3.13787°W		1902	A row of buildings later converted into a public house and restaurant. They are in slate with sandstone dressings and have roofs of Westmorland slate. The former court to the left has a gabled wing containing a Venetian window, a porch with a segmental pediment and a single column to the right, and sash windows. To the right is the former police station, with two storeys and three bays. It has a central doorway flanked by three-light mullioned windows, and dormers above. To the right of this is a three-bay extension with two doorways, a dormer, and a gable at the right end.	II
War memorial 54.60127°N 3.13443°W		1922	The memorial, by Francis Derwent Wood, is in stone, and consists of a pedimented pylon on a rectangular platform with a three-stepped base. On the front face of the pylon is the figure of Victory carved in relief. Attached to the base are four plaques in Honister slate with inscriptions and the names of those lost in the two World Wars. Also on the monument is a replaced brass plaque commemorating the employees of the Cockermouth, Keswick and Penrith Railway who were lost in the First World War.	II
Outbuilding opposite Packhorse Inn; 54.60079°N 3.13660°W	—	Uncertain	A small square building in rubble stone. It has two storeys and contains a sash window on each floor. The building has a curved single-storey wing with a doorway and a small window. Its purpose is unknown.	II
