= Dearham railway station =

Disused railway station in Cumbria, England

Dearham

General information
- Location: Dearham, Cumberland; England
- Coordinates: 54.7077°N 3.4306°W
- Grid reference: NY078356
- Platforms: 1

Other information
- Status: Disused

History
- Original company: Maryport & Carlisle Railway
- Post-grouping: London Midland and Scottish Railway

Key dates
- 1 June 1867: Opened
- 29 April 1935: Station and line closed
Location
- Location within the former Allerdale Borough Location within Cumbria

Dearham railway station was on the single track Derwent Branch of the Maryport and Carlisle Railway (M&CR) in the then county of Cumberland, now Cumbria, England.

The station was opened in 1867, situated on the south eastern edge of Dearham village. There was a passing loop and a siding at the station.

== Passenger services ==
All passenger trains along the branch line called at Dearham station.

The initial service in August 1867 consisted of two trains each way between Bullgill (written then as "Bull Gill") and Brigham calling at Dearham and Papcastle, Monday to Saturday. By November of that year this had been doubled, with all trains reversing at Brigham to run to and from Cockermouth.

By June 1876 this pattern continued, with two trains added each way on Sundays between Cockermouth and Bullgill.

From 1887 to 1914 five trains started from Maryport with a sixth from Bullgill, all with balancing services, Monday to Saturday. It is not clear whether passengers had to change at Bullgill or whether a reversal took place there as well as at Brigham. Two trains from Maryport and one Bullgill, with balancing services, ran on Sundays. Dearham Bridge and Papcastle were shown as "Signal Stops" where intending passengers had to inform railway staff who would stop the train accordingly.

Much was made locally of the fact that it was quicker to use the through coach from Carlisle to Cockermouth via the branch than to go via Penrith or Workington.

In 1914 Sunday trains were withdrawn.

Sources differ when Papcastle closed. One says it lost even its Signal Stop status (by implication, closed) in 1914 whilst another gives its closure date as 1921.

The journey time from Cockermouth to Bullgill averaged 25 minutes.

In 1922 six trains called at the station in each direction, Monday to Saturday, with no Sunday service.

== Closure ==
The service through the station survived until 1935.

Unusually for those times the tracks were lifted not long after closure, with a tragic consequence, when a bridge was being demolished a girder fell on two men and killed them.

== Afterlife ==
By 2013 little trace of the station remained.

Preceding station	Disused railways	Following station
Bullgill; Line and station closed	Maryport & Carlisle Railway; Derwent Branch	Linefoot; Line and station closed

== See also ==
- Maryport & Carlisle Railway
- Whitehaven, Cleator and Egremont Railway
- Cleator and Workington Junction Railway
- Cockermouth & Workington Railway
- Dearham Bridge railway station
