= Papcastle railway station =

Disused railway station in Cumbria, England

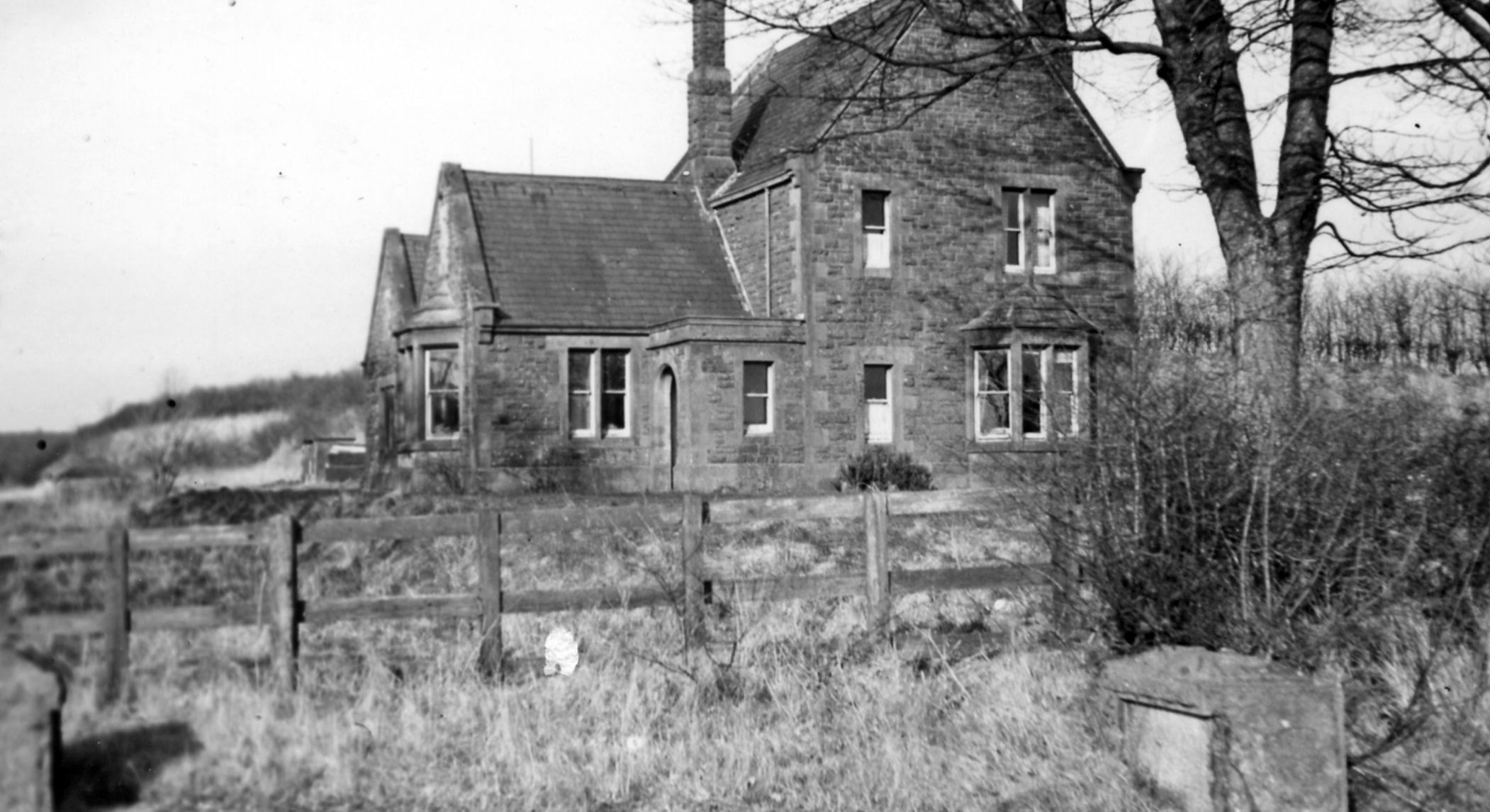
- Papcastle station, remains 20 March 1952

General information
- Location: Papcastle, Cumberland; England
- Coordinates: 54.6706°N 3.4111°W
- Grid reference: NY090315
- Platforms: 1

Other information
- Status: Disused

History
- Original company: Maryport & Carlisle Railway
- Post-grouping: London Midland and Scottish Railway

Key dates
- 1 June 1867: Opened
- 1 July 1921: Station closed to passengers
- After May 1922: Unadvertised use by quarrymen ended
- 29 April 1935: Line closed and subsequently lifted
Location

Papcastle railway station was on the single track Derwent Branch of the Maryport and Carlisle Railway (M&CR) in the then county of Cumberland, now Cumbria, England.

The station was opened in 1867, situated over a mile from the village of Papcastle. Sidings to the substantial Broughtoncraggs Quarry led off the line opposite the station.

== Passenger services ==
Until 1914 all passenger trains along the branch called at Papcastle, from 1887, by request.

The initial service in August 1867 consisted of two trains each way between Bullgill (written then as "Bull Gill") and Brigham calling at Dearham and Papcastle, Monday to Saturday. By November of that year this had been doubled, with all trains reversing at Brigham to run to and from Cockermouth.

By June 1876 this pattern continued, with two trains added each way on Sundays between Cockermouth and Bullgill.

From 1887 to 1914 five trains started from Maryport with a sixth from Bullgill, all with balancing services, Monday to Saturday. It is not clear whether passengers had to change at Bullgill or whether a reversal took place there as well as at Brigham. Two trains from Maryport and one Bullgill, with balancing services, ran on Sundays. Dearham Bridge and Papcastle were shown as "Signal Stops" where intending passengers had to inform railway staff who would stop the train accordingly. In the case of Papcastle this meant alerting a platelayer's wife living nearby.

Much was made locally of the fact that it was quicker to use the through coach from Carlisle to Cockermouth via the branch than to go via Penrith or Workington.

In 1914 Sunday trains were withdrawn.

Sources differ when Papcastle closed. One says it lost even its Signal Stop status (by implication, closed) in 1914 whilst others give its closure date as 1921. Unadvertised calls were made for quarrymen until at least May 1922.

The journey time from Cockermouth to Bullgill averaged 25 minutes.

In 1922 six trains passed through the station in each direction, Monday to Saturday, with no Sunday service.

The service through the station survived until 1935, with trains running from Maryport to Cockermouth, with reversals at Bullgill and Brigham. Much was made locally of the fact that it was quicker to use the through coach from Carlisle to Cockermouth via the branch than to go via Penrith or Workington. This was theoretical for the residents of Papcastle for two reasons, first, the trains didn't stop at "their" station and second, they could walk to Cockermouth more quickly than they could walk to Papcastle station.

Unusually for those times the tracks were lifted not long after closure, with a tragic consequence, when a bridge was being demolished a girder fell on two men and killed them.

== Afterlife ==
In 2020 the station was in use as a dwelling.

Preceding station	Disused railways	Following station
Dovenby Lodge; Line and station closed	Maryport & Carlisle Railway; Derwent Branch	Brigham; Line and station closed

== See also ==
- Maryport & Carlisle Railway
- Whitehaven, Cleator and Egremont Railway
- Cleator and Workington Junction Railway
- Cockermouth & Workington Railway
