= Carlisle Bogfield railway station =

Short-lived railway station in Carlisle, Cumbria

General information
- Location: Carlisle, Cumberland; England
- Coordinates: 54.8864°N 2.9315°W
- Grid reference: NY403550

Other information
- Status: Disused

History
- Original company: Maryport and Carlisle Railway
- Pre-grouping: Maryport and Carlisle Railway

Key dates
- 10 May 1843: Opened
- 30 December 1844: Closed
Location

Carlisle Bogfield railway station, also known as Carlisle Water Lane railway station, served the city of Carlisle, in the historical county of Cumberland, England, from 1843 to 1844 on the Maryport and Carlisle Railway.

== History ==
The station was opened on 10 May 1843 by the Maryport and Carlisle Railway. It was a short-lived station, being replaced by Carlisle Crown Street station on 30 December 1844.

Preceding station	Historical railways	Following station
Dalston; Line and station open	Maryport and Carlisle Railway	Terminus
