= Maryport and Carlisle Railway =

British railway company

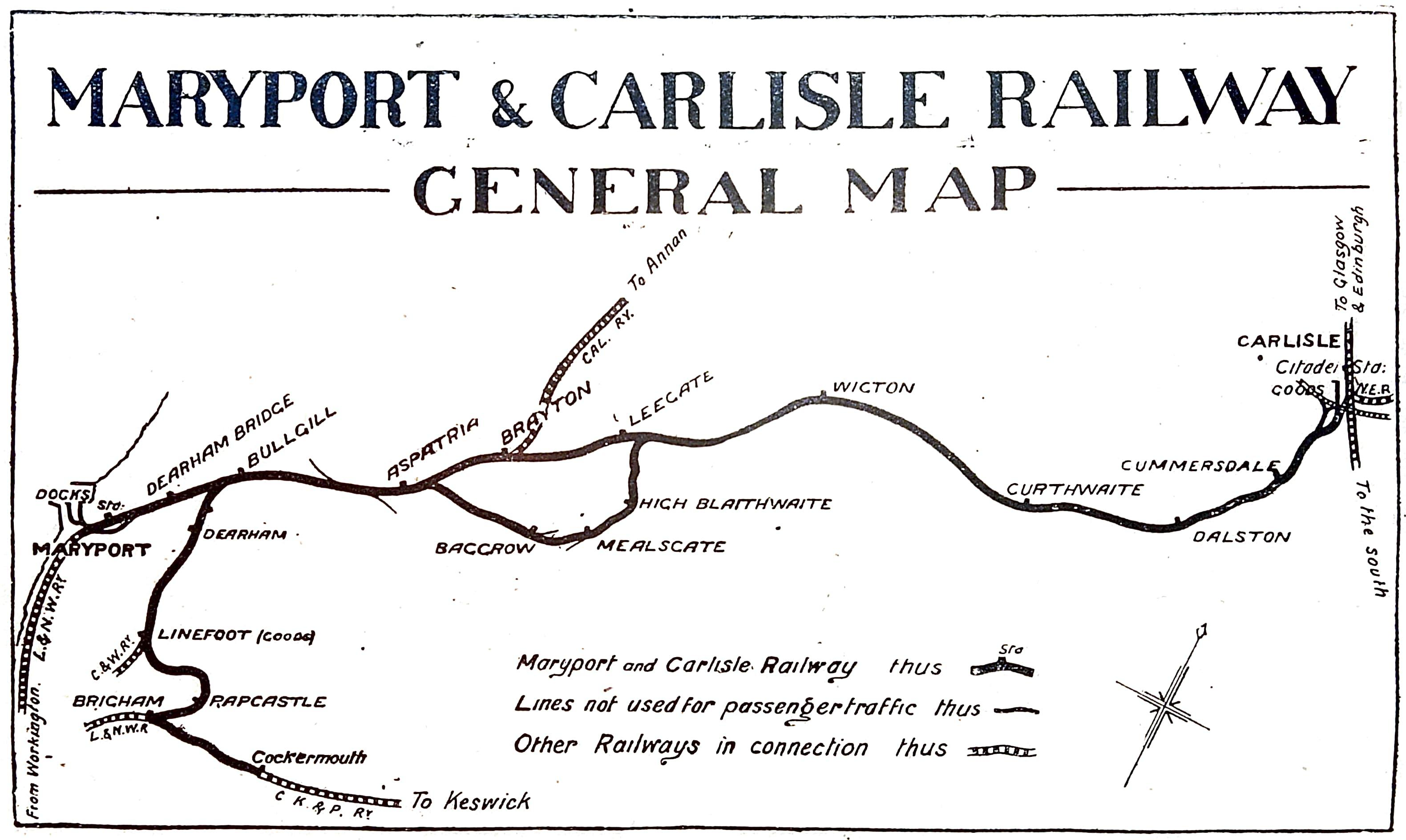
- 1920 map of the railway

Technical
- Track gauge: 4 ft 8 1/2 in (1,435 mm)
- Length: 42 miles 63 chains (68.9 km) (1919)
- Track length: 100 miles 34 chains (161.6 km) (1919)

The Maryport and Carlisle Railway (M&CR) was an English railway company formed in 1836 which built and operated a small but eventually highly profitable railway to connect Maryport and Carlisle in Cumberland, England. There were many small collieries in the area and efficient access to the harbour at Maryport was important.

The western end, connecting the majority of the collieries to Maryport opened in 1840 and the line was completed throughout to Carlisle in 1845. The considerable resources of coal, and later iron ore, carried by the railway made it especially profitable, and this was redoubled at the height of the iron and steel processing industries around Workington. Branch lines were opened to connect further collieries.

After 1918 the industries on which the line was dependent declined steeply, and the railway declined accordingly; the branch lines closed, but the original main line remains open and forms part of the Cumbrian Coast Line between Carlisle and Barrow in Furness.

== Conception ==
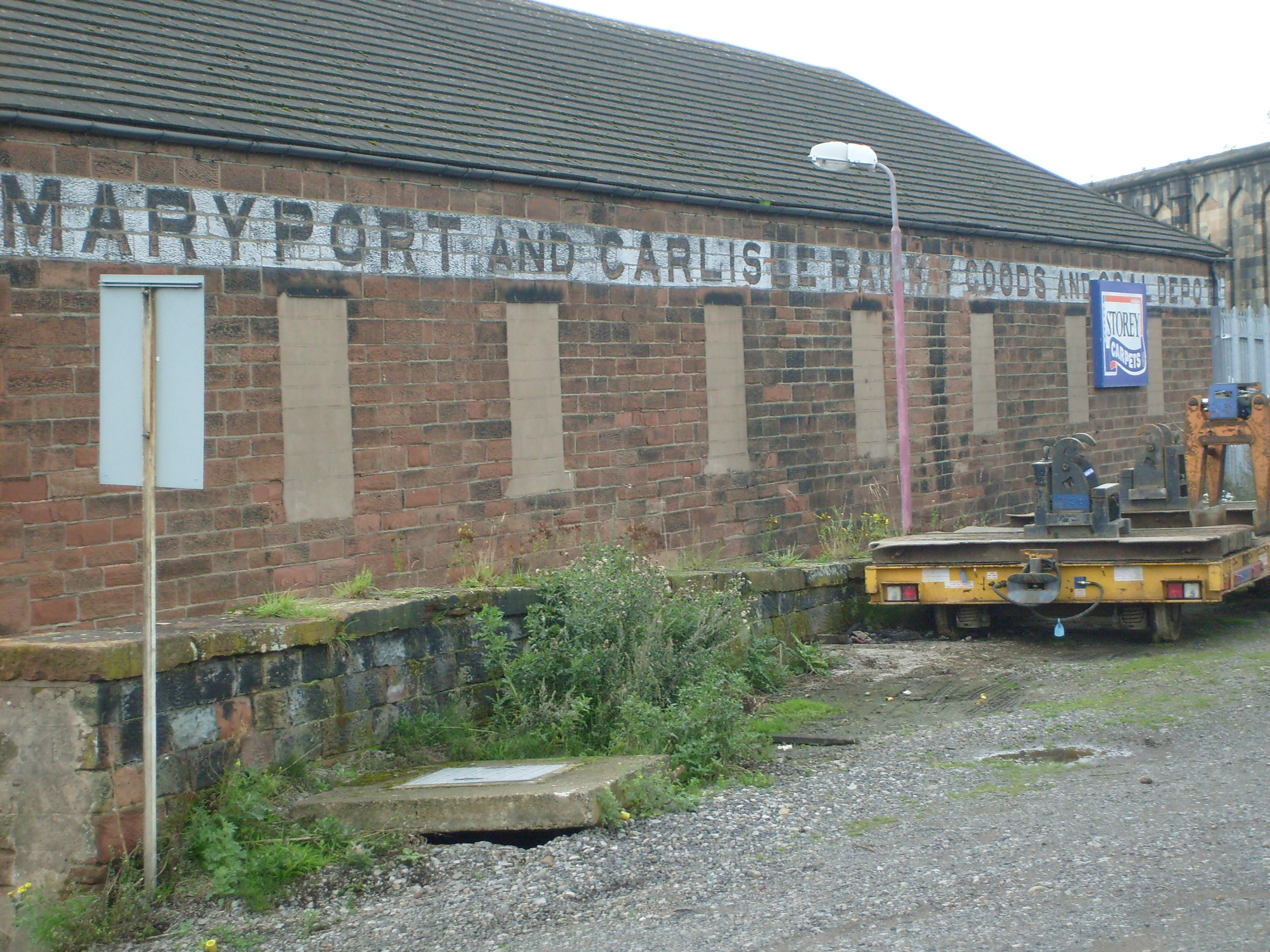
Goods and Coal Depot, Carlisle

Coal had been mined in west Cumberland since the 17th century. Most of the coalfield was south of Maryport, and enjoyed easy access to harbours at Workington and Whitehaven, through which the coal could be shipped. Useful coal deposits were known to exist east of Maryport, as far as Aspatria, but it was difficult to work them profitably, for want of practicable roads. Early in the eighteenth century new collieries started work and in 1749 Humphrey Senhouse, lord of the manor, constructed a harbour and founded the town of Maryport at the mouth of the River Ellen. His son (also Humphrey Senhouse) was involved in the 1790s in the promotion of a canal from Newcastle upon Tyne to Maryport, but the project lapsed in the financial crisis of 1797. When thoughts turned again in the 1820s to improving the links from Newcastle to Cumberland a Newcastle—Carlisle canal was rejected in favour of a railway. Speaking at an 1834 dinner marking the inauguration of gas lighting in Maryport Sir Humphrey Fleming Senhouse "alluded to the situation of Maryport as an inlet for an important district of the country, and strongly urged the importance of a railway to join that now in progress from Carlisle to Newcastle".

Maryport and Carlisle Railway Act 1837
- Act of Parliament
- Parliament of the United Kingdom
- Long title: An Act for making a Railway from the Town and Port of Maryport to the Borough of Carlisle, to be called "The Maryport and Carlisle Railway."
- Citation: 7 Will. 4 & 1 Vict. c. ci

Dates
- Royal assent: 12 July 1837

Other legislation
- Repealed by: Maryport and Carlisle Railway Act 1855

Status: Repealed

Text of statute as originally enacted

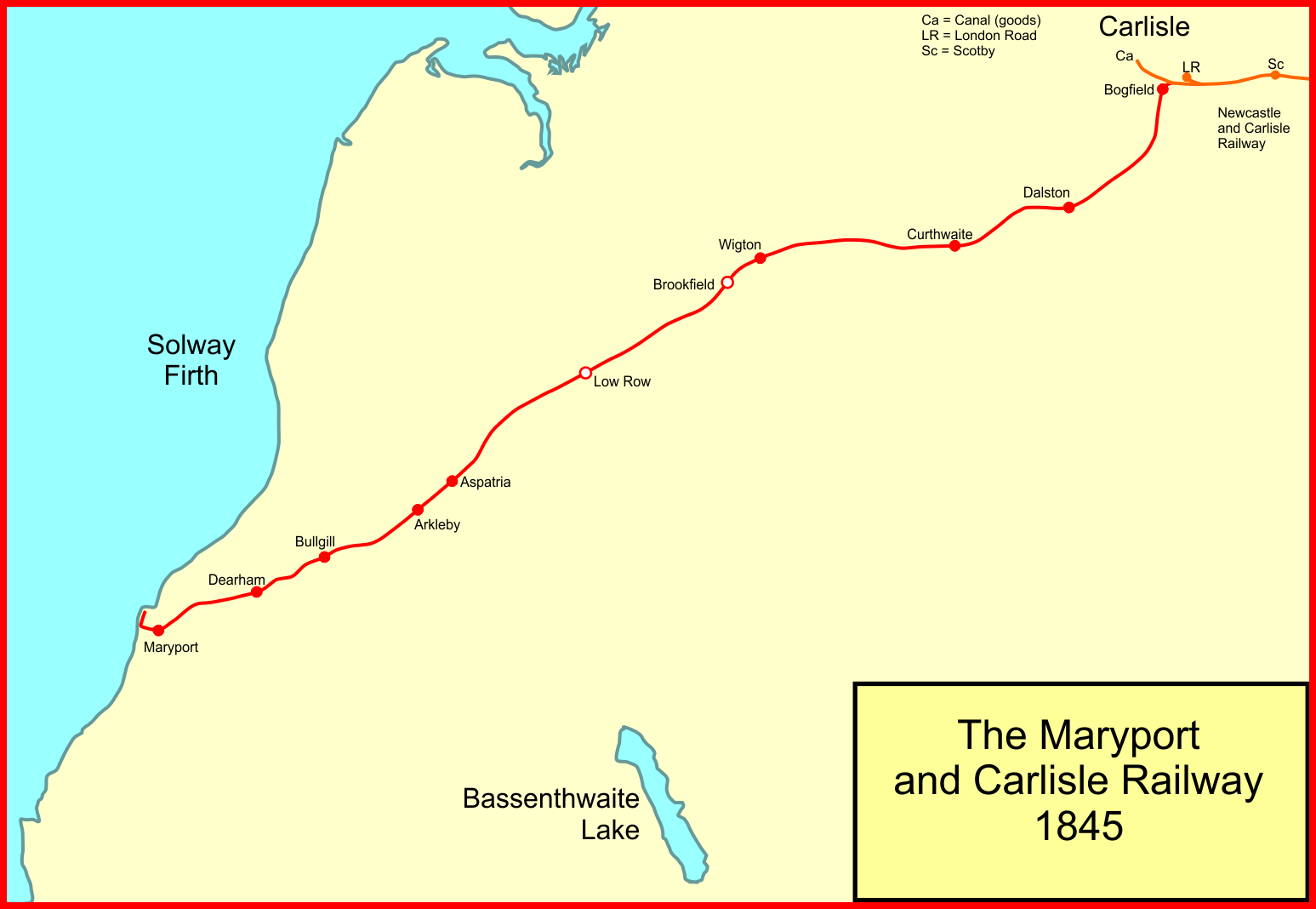
System map of the Maryport and Carlisle Railway in 1845

The suggestion was taken up, and in August 1836 George Stephenson visited Maryport, and in October 1836 reported the results of a survey carried out for him, which showed that such a railway was practicable and potentially profitable. Dividends of 18% were promised, and a prospectus was issued; the Maryport and Carlisle Railway obtained its authorising act of Parliament, the Maryport and Carlisle Railway Act 1837 (7 Will. 4 & 1 Vict. c. ci), on 12 July 1837. The act asserted that the line "would facilitate the communication between the Continent of Europe and Ireland and the Western Coast of England by forming in conjunction with the Newcastle-upon-Tyne and Carlisle Railway and the Brandlings Junction Railway, one complete and continuous line of communication from the German Ocean to the Irish Sea". The authorised capital was £180,000.

== Construction and opening ==
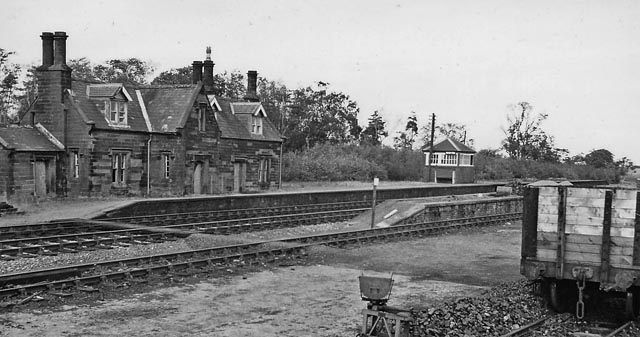
Remains of Brayton railway station in 1961

Construction was relatively easy with little requirement for heavy civil engineering works; however much of the subscribed capital was not forthcoming when the calls were made, the lack of cash severely slowed construction, many shares were forfeit, and the directors resorted to unauthorised borrowing.

=== Maryport to Aspatria ===
The 7-mile (11 km) section from Maryport to the pits at Arkleby (1 1/4 miles [2 km] short of Aspatria) was opened for mineral traffic on 15 July 1840.

Soon after eleven o'clock the directors and their friends, including several ladies, took their seats in the train, and off they set to Arkleby and Oughterside; at the latter place they took in charge twenty waggons of coal from the pits of Mr. Harris of Greysouthen, (Note: Joseph Harris, a magistrate, landed proprietor, and director of the M&CR was working the Domain Colliery (Nos 1, 3 and Hall pits) at Oughterside. He lived at – and owned a number of pits in the area of – Greysouthen which lies in the Derwent valley, well away from the Maryport and Carlisle route (and was eventually served by the Cockermouth and Workington Railway). He – and even more so his son John ('Captain Harris') – should not be confused with Mr (John) Harris 'of Darlington' – a civil engineer born Maryport, for a period engineer to the M&CR, a shareholder in other West Cumbrian lines, and eventually an owner of pits in the West Cumberland coalfield, including one at Greysouthen.) with which they returned to Maryport, and immediately shipped them on board a vessel. The next train brought twenty wagons of coals from the pits of Mr W. Peile, (Note: Mr. W. Peile was the son of the general manager of Whitehaven Colliery quoted below.) of Gilcrux, which were also shipped.

The line ran from the South Quay at Maryport, and the Maryport passenger station was in front of what is now Jubilee Terrace. (Note: A directors' special train ran on the opening day, (and the Ellen had hauled three wagons full of passengers over about 2 miles (3 km) of track during her acceptance trials in April 1840) but routine passenger trains seem not to have started running until autumn 1840.) The line was extended from Arkleby to Aspatria on 12 April 1841. Bridges on the line were built with little more than 1 foot (0.3 m) in lateral clearances between bridge and train; much less than came to be the norm in the UK, and as a consequence unwary passengers have in the past stuck their head out of a window and been killed.

The line achieved a major reduction on transport costs in the northern coalfield. It now cost Brayton Colliery 4 shillings per wagon (Note: "Waggon" was a measure of capacity, not weight, up to 1836; after that a weight corresponding roughly to the average wagon load – in 1842 at Whitehaven 48 long hundredweight (2,400 kg), but a Maryport colliery agreed its rates with the M&CR in 1841 on the basis of a 50-long-hundredweight (2,500 kg) wagon.) to transport their coal to Maryport by railway, when road transport had formerly cost them 9 shillings per wagon; Gilcrux colliery were now paying half the 7 shillings per wagon road transport had cost them. At that time Whitehaven coal was being sold to the shippers at 16s 6d delivered on board. Output from the northern coalfield increased rapidly, and with it the tonnage of coal shipped from Maryport. In 1842, the general manager of Whitehaven Collieries reported:

"The promoters of the Maryport & Carlisle Railway had the avowed object in view to injure Whitehaven, in which they have been successful".

By 1846, almost as much coal was being shipped out through Maryport as through Whitehaven. (Note: Workington was a poor third; it had been held back for the two preceding generations by 'wilful, not to say wicked political obstruction' the Whig Curwens owned the south bank, the Tory Sir James Lowther (later the first Earl of Lonsdale: "the bad Earl") owned the north bank and obstructed any improvement that would benefit the Curwens.)

=== Carlisle to Wigton ===
With the line operating from Maryport to Aspatria, attention turned to construction at the Carlisle end (as was required by the Maryport and Carlisle Railway Act 1837). The section from Carlisle to Wigton was opened on 3 May 1843:

In the course of the forenoon three trains of carriages arrived from Carlisle, drawn by the Star, the new patent engine of Messrs. Hawthorne and Co. of Newcastle... the Ballantine and the Nelson engines belonging to the Newcastle and Carlisle Railway, and which had been lent for the occasion... (Note: However, the same paper had reported the delivery of the Ballantyne to the Wigton end of the new section of line in July 1842.) Soon after one o'clock, the different trains were filled with passengers, amongst whom were many of the fair sex, who appeared not the least interested of the vast concourse in the proceedings... at twenty-three minutes past one o'clock, the eldritch scream of the steam whistle warned all that everything was in readiness, and off the first train started, amidst the hearty cheers of the assembled thousands. The other trains started at intervals sufficiently "respectable" to ensure safety from all chance of collision.

The location of the Carlisle station was described as

... nearly on the site of the ancient hospital of Saint Nicholas. The line here runs parallel, and on the same level, with the Newcastle and Carlisle Railway, and the trains passing on to that line were carried forward to the Station of that company at London Road—the ancient Gallows Hill.

The connection was with an extension of the Newcastle and Carlisle Railway, running to the Port Carlisle Canal basin at Caldewgate; this ran to the west of the subsequent line of the Lancaster and Carlisle Railway, and the M&CR station was to the west of the junction "near where Currock Pool formerly stood" in an area known as Bogfield.

=== Closing the gap ===
This left a gap between Aspatria and Wigton; a wagonette conveyed passengers over the central section by road. The 8-mile (13 km) gap was closed in two stages; sections at each end, from Aspatria to Low Row and from Wigton to Brookfield, were opened on 2 December 1844. The gap was finally closed in January 1845 for goods traffic, through passenger services commencing on 10 February 1845. Brookfield closed immediately; Low Row was replaced by a new station at Leegate in 1848. There were initially three through passenger trains each way daily (one 'mixed' and two 'quick'); passengers for Whitehaven could avail themselves of a connecting coach service, which left Whitehaven for Maryport two and a quarter hours before the 'quick trains' left Maryport for Carlisle, and left Maryport for Whitehaven one and a half hours after quick trains left Carlisle. There was no advertised Sunday service, but in May 1846 a second mixed train was added to the weekday service and two Sunday trains were introduced.

== Early mismanagement ==
The M&CR gained an unenviable reputation in its early years.

=== "Considerable dissatisfaction on the part of the public" ===
The Carlisle Journal repeatedly criticised the management of the M&CR and frequently published letters airing the grievances of the travelling public; "almost daily public complaints of want of accommodation, of irregularity, of notorious incivility somewhere, as well as mismanagement everywhere" according to one correspondent. Reporting on the first train to run from Carlisle to Workington, the Carlisle Journal remarked that those used to travelling on the Maryport line would not be surprised to hear that the train set off a quarter of an hour late; relating further mishaps it talked of "the cause of all the bungling on this line – the want of system" Even shareholders were disenchanted; their half-yearly meeting in August 1846 heard allegations of open drunkenness of on-duty railway employees going unchecked. Hence the following advertisement:

To The Public

Maryport And Carlisle Railway

Considerable dissatisfaction on the part of the Public having existed for some time past, relative to the management of the Maryport and Carlisle Railway. And it being the unanimous wish of the Directors that every possible attention shall be paid to the convenience and comfort of every Passenger who may travel on this Line, and also that every facility should be given for the regular transit and due delivery of Goods, Parcels, &c., compatible with the existing state of this Railway

Notice is Hereby Given,

That prompt attention will be paid to every complaint respecting the irregularity in the arrival and departure of any of the Trains, as well as to any inattention or want of civility to any Passenger, by any officer or servant of the company, arising from intoxication or any other cause, on application to either of the Undersigned, who have recently been appointed Directors, to superintend the affairs of the Railway at the Eastern Terminus... Carlisle, 21 August 1846

=== 'Revolution on the Maryport and Carlisle' ===
The directors set up a subcommittee to look into allegations of mismanagement, but before it could report the financial management of the company was attacked at the half-yearly shareholders' meeting. It emerged that there was no list of shareholders meeting the requirements of Parliament, nor was there any independent audit of accounts (they were looked over by a company director, who also acted as a solicitor for the company, although not officially the company solicitor). Two representatives of Newcastle shareholders attended, complaining that shares had been sold in Newcastle by the company at a premium on the assurance of its representative (the solicitor-cum-director) that a dividend of 8% was to be expected; a dividend of 4% had then been declared and this was partly funded by the premium on the shares sold. The company secretary was not an efficient officer – "the time was come when some one ought to be at the head of the Company who is competent to manage its affairs". The chairman of the sub-committee whilst refusing to go into detail ahead of the submission of their report confirmed that they were satisfied that "it was most essential and important that there should be a thorough change in everything connected with the Company" The Railway Chronicle editorialised that "the conduct of the board ... was a specimen of everything that a business-like management could avoid"; the company secretary (who had also been acting as its engineer) was dismissed and a committee of five directors set up to more closely supervise the operation of the railway.

The next shareholders' meeting in February 1847 was told there was no immediate prospect of a dividend being paid (interest payments on the company's borrowings, and the running costs of the railway ate up in almost equal measure the operational receipts); the meeting then voted to explore the possibility of amalgamation with the Newcastle and Carlisle or the Lancaster and Carlisle railways. The Newcastle and Carlisle offered to lease the line, paying 5% a year on M&CR shares, but negotiations lapsed: matters had improved for the M&CR, which found itself able to pay a 3% a year dividend. Results for the first half of 1848, however, showed the M&CR to be running at a loss: receipts were down 20% and interest payments were higher; it was therefore resolved to negotiate the leasing of the line by George Hudson, the Railway King and chairman of numerous railway companies chiefly in the east of the country. Hudson proposed a lease of the line by the York, Newcastle and Berwick Railway from 1 October 1848, matching a lease just taken by Hudson personally of the Newcastle and Carlisle Railway. He guaranteed the M&CR a dividend of 4%. The offer was accepted by a shareholders' meeting from which the press were excluded.

As the means by which Hudson had made his money and gained control of so many railways began to be exposed, and to unravel, the bill authorising lease of the M&CR and the N&CR by an East Coast company was rejected by the Commons as an attempt to monopolise traffic between North East England and Scotland, and from 1 January 1850 those companies reverted to their own managements' control.

The exposure of Hudson's misdeeds elsewhere, and the renewed necessity to make the M&CR pay its way following the repudiation of Hudson's lease led to an investigation of the affairs of the M&CR by a committee from which directors were excluded. The committee reported multiple failings of previous and current directors of the company, in some cases involving 'open disregard of the law': borrowing before the specified number of shares had been fully paid; misbooking of interest on working capital to capital rather than revenue; failure to identify and book outstanding liabilities against the revenue account; failure to make any allowance for depreciation; appointing company officers on the basis of nepotism, cronyism and patronage rather than fitness for the post; favouritism in the setting of rates for coal traffic (the wisdom of colliery owners being directors – and of allowing directors to influence specific negotiations – was questioned); failure to state clearly the roles and responsibilities of company officers; division of company legal work piecemeal between too many solicitors (with the result that "no one person seems to have had a full and accurate knowledge of ... transactions involving the Crown Street station")

=== Trouble with termini – the Crown Street affair ===
Maryport and Carlisle Railway Act 1844
- Act of Parliament
- Parliament of the United Kingdom
- Long title: An Act to amend the Acts relating to the Maryport and Carlisle Railway, and for making certain Extensions and Branches connected therewith.
- Citation: 7 & 8 Vict. c. xxxvi

Dates
- Royal assent: 6 June 1844

Other legislation
- Repealed by: Maryport and Carlisle Railway Act 1855

Status: Repealed

The original Maryport and Carlisle Railway Act 1837 gave the M&CR no powers to deviate from its connection to the N&CR to a more convenient Carlisle terminus. At this time, the route for the Lancaster and Carlisle Railway and its partner the Caledonian Railway were being prepared, and the proposed main line to Scotland was arranged to pass to the west of Carlisle (and very close to the Crown Street site) to allow a common central station to serve all the Carlisle railways. The Maryport Company preferred to proceed with its own station at Crown Street on Botchergate. The act authorising this, the Maryport and Carlisle Railway Act 1844 (7 & 8 Vict. c. xxxvi), received royal assent on the same day (6 June 1844) as the Lancaster and Carlisle Railway Act 1844 (7 & 8 Vict. c. xxxvi): a clause in the M&CR's act established that the powers (such as compulsory purchase) given the L&CR under their act had priority, provided that these powers could not be exercised to prevent the M&CR acquiring the bare minimum of land required for its branch. Litigation then ensued, but although the M&CR lost the case, it succeeded in reaching its Crown Street land by a branch from the Canal line, and opened its station there on 30 December 1844; trains backed into and out of the station.

In May 1845, the four railway companies (Caledonian, L&CR, M&CR, N&CR) finally agreed upon a site for their joint station, but the Maryport negotiators insisted that they should pay only a moderate share of the cost, as they already owned a station close by, which (they argued) might have been extended to form the joint station. Some dispute followed and in September 1846, it was arranged that the joint station should be built at once entirely at the cost of the L&CR and the Caledonian; the resulting Carlisle Citadel station opened in September 1847. The approach tracks from the south were crossed on the level at least three times by every M&CR train movement into or out of Crown Street; if the M&CR train continued to London Road, it made a fourth crossing. This was naturally objected to by the L&CR, which considered the Crown Street station illegal; moreover they required the land for the further development of goods facilities in connection with the Citadel station, and had obtained legal powers in an act of Parliament allowing them to purchase the land. The M&CR had agreed in writing to sell the land at cost price; it was willing to sell the site for £7,000 but any dispute as to the true value could be settled by a referee appointed by the Board of Trade.

Hudson, once he became the lessee of the M&CR demanded a much higher sum: not just for the land (about 6 acres [2.4 ha]), but as compensation for the loss of the passenger traffic and coal trade which it was claimed would follow if the Crown Street station was lost and a new station had to be built at Bogfield (the cost of which he also asked the L&CR to meet). At a two-day hearing held at Carlisle in January 1849 to ascertain the true value, witnesses for the M&CR (all associated with or employed by Hudson-controlled lines) gave their estimates of the appropriate total compensation; all the estimates were over £70,000. After hearing the evidence for the L&CR on agreements previously reached between the companies, the jury awarded the M&CR £7,171 4s 3d for the land, with no compensation for the other items claimed for. The awarded sum was duly paid into court and at the end of February 1849 the M&CR was given formal notice to quit. Hudson refused and attempted to get the proceedings quashed. (Note: Hudson attempted to get proceedings quashed on a procedural point: M&CR legal affairs had been attended to by the same solicitor as before its lease, but he was no longer officially its company solicitor. Only the official company solicitors (a York firm) had the authority to agree to the choice of jurymen. The case was not heard until 1850, when it was dismissed; the former company secretary clearly was an authorised agent of the York solicitors.)

At 10 am on 17 March 1849, the Undersheriff of Cumberland (Note: The Sheriff of Cumberland was an L&CR director, and therefore thought it inappropriate to be directly involved in the affair. Similarly, he should have convened the January 1849 hearing on the amount of compensation, but had delegated the responsibility to the coroner.) appeared at the station and, after some words with the M&CR clerks, the only representatives of the company present, gave possession of it to a solicitor acting for the L&CR. Upon a wave of the latter's handkerchief,

... [a] strong force of at least 100 men, armed with crow-bars, pick-axes, shovels, &c., rushed from the goods yard of the Lancaster company, to which they had been brought from all parts of the line, to the ground of the Maryport Company, and, without further ceremony, commenced operation by tearing up the rails. This was the work of a few minutes only, as the men were particularly expert. They next pulled down the sheds of the coal and lime depots; and lastly, having allowed the clerks of the Maryport Company sufficient time carry off the books, they gutted the station, which was certainly only a temporary one, and carried away the building! ... In the meantime, a man was posted near to where the Maryport line joins that of the Newcastle and Carlisle Company, and at about 200 yards [180 m] distance from the station of the former company, to inform the driver of the engine due at half-past 11, that he could not proceed further upon the line. The driver, upon hearing this, immediately drove off to the Gallowhill station of the Newcastle Railway. ...

A goods customer subsequently spoke of the M&CR consequently using "their old station outside the city" but all M&CR passenger services were now obliged to run to London Road:

The station belonging to the Maryport and Carlisle Railway, situate in Crown Street, Carlisle, having suddenly been Removed by the Lancaster and Carlisle Railway on Saturday last, the Market Day, Notice is hereby given that, until further notice, the Maryport and Carlisle trains will run to and from the Newcastle and Carlisle Railway's station, London Road. The Public having been put to very great inconvenience by the sudden Removal of the above-named Station, and expressed great dissatisfaction thereon, it is only right to state that the directors of the Maryport and Carlisle Railway were not cognisant of, and consequently in no way to blame in this affair.

After Hudson's lease was terminated, the M&CR continued to use London Road as its Carlisle terminus, paying the Newcastle company £250 a year for the accommodation, until (1 June 1851) Citadel station became the M&CR's Carlisle terminus, with trains backing in from the Canal line as they had done in the days of Crown Street. M&CR goods business was then (January 1852) transferred from London Road to 'the Bog Station of the company'.

On 8 August 1852, a direct M&CR line into the Citadel station was opened, crossing the Canal line on the level, and joining the Lancaster line at the south end of the station. A few weeks later, the Company opened its own goods station west of the new line. This was on Crown Street, but not on the site of the old M&CR station. Although commonly known as Carlisle Crown Street, local papers also referred to it as the Bog Station (although it was not on the site of the original station at Bogfield) to distinguish it from the L&NWR goods depot subsequently built also on Crown Street (and on the site of the old M&CR terminus); in 1924 (after grouping, when company names could no longer be used to distinguish between the depots) the ex-M&CR depot was renamed Carlisle (Bog).

== Reform and recovery ==
"It would appear that a worse state of things never was brought to light than this report has revealed to the public" said Herepath's Railway Journal of the 1850 committee's report, but much of the detail was challenged. A former company solicitor had helped the investigating committee, and there was charge and counter-charge as to the solicitor's role in the company's difficulties and hence whether the report was accurate or an exercise in score-settling, mud-slinging and rewriting of history aimed to exonerate him. Nonetheless, a way forward was agreed. Three of the committee were elected directors and sat (with the chairman and three old directors) on a managing committee, which a year later (with a change of chairman) became the company board. Loans were retired by the issue of two tranches of preference shares (which would receive the dividend on ordinary shares, should that be higher): (4% preference (up to the company's authorised share capital), 4.5% preference (when authorised capital was increased by the act of Parliament for the direct connection into Citadel).

Maryport and Carlisle Railway Act 1855
- Act of Parliament
- Parliament of the United Kingdom
- Long title: An Act to consolidate and amend the Acts relating to the Maryport and Carlisle Railway; to authorize the Company to improve their existing Railway; to make new Branches, Stations, and other Additions to their Works; to raise further Monies; and for other Purposes.
- Citation: 18 & 19 Vict. c. lxxix

Dates
- Royal assent: 26 June 1855

Text of statute as originally enacted

Passenger traffic was increased by the innovations of season tickets, cheap return tickets and faster trains, although the M&C avoided any timings that might interfere with its profitable goods traffic. Poor performance, poor facilities, and uncompetitive pricing by the M&CR had led to much of the coal raised in the northern coalfield going to Maryport by road, rather than rail; the shortcomings were addressed and the traffic won back. In 1857 (when of the 644,000 long tons (654,000 t) of coal shipped from West Cumberland, 340,000 long tons (350,000 t) were shipped through Maryport) a larger dock (the Elizabeth Dock, covering 3.5 acres (1.4 ha)) opened at Maryport, served by a short branch of the M&CR, built under the Maryport and Carlisle Railway Act 1855 (18 & 19 Vict. c. lxxix) of 26 June 1855. (Note: The arrangement of dock and railway may be hard to visualise from current (maps of) Maryport; it was captured by the Ordnance Survey six-inch map of Maryport (surveyed in 1864).) Doubling the track became essential to accommodate the volume of mineral traffic and to facilitate reliable passenger services. This already been done from Maryport to Arkleby by 1847; it was extended to Wigton in 1858 (only after the widening of embankments). Doubling was then undertaken from the Carlisle end, the line being doubled throughout in November 1860 and passed for use by goods and passenger traffic 15 February 1861, double line operation throughout starting the next day. More coal waggons were purchased, and siding capacity increased. (Note: To stop the coal traffic being halted by adverse winds; the colliers the coal was discharged into at Maryport were still predominantly sailing ships.) Annual coal exports from Maryport reached 466,000 long tons (473,000 t) by 1866; about 300,000 long tons (305,000 t) of this coming over the M&CR.

All expenditure now came under much closer scrutiny – "the advantages of careful auditing are strikingly exemplified in the progress of this company" said the Railway Times in 1853 when the dividend was 4% – but the M&C was not afraid to spend money to save money. To reduce maintenance costs, the original track (56 lb/yd (28 kg/m) rails laid on stone blocks) was relaid (with 84 lb/yd (42 kg/m) rails, fish-jointed and laid on sleepers) as funds permitted over the late 1850s; cast iron wheels on the rolling stock were replaced with (more robust) malleable iron ones. The M&CR was one of the first railways to fuel their locomotives with coal, rather than the more expensive coke (1859); fuel costs for the first half of 1860 were estimated to have been reduced by over £900. In 1864 locomotives were reported to be 'greatly improved' by the fitting of steel axles and wheel tyres: the M&CR is thought to have been the first UK company to do this.

By 1860 the dividend was 6.5% a year, and M&C shares were selling above par; by 1864 the dividend was 10% a year.

== Expansion ==
The M&CR undertook two extensions to their network, both essentially defensive:

=== The Bolton loop ===
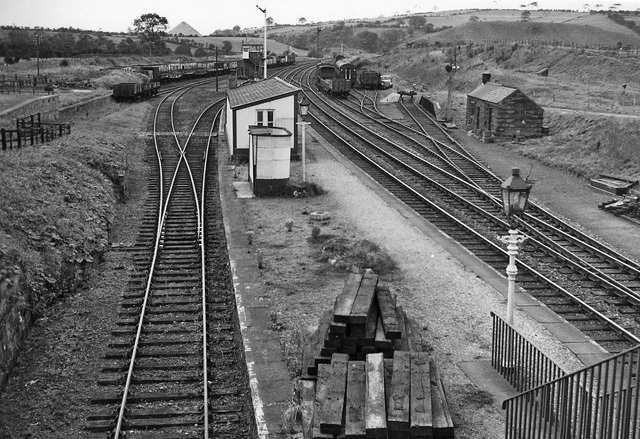
Remains of Bullgill station in 1961

In 1861, the Carlisle and Silloth Bay Railway wished to expand into the coalfield around Mealsgate and promoted a line from their Abbey station. Nothing came of the scheme, but the Maryport and Carlisle Railway was spurred to provide a connection from its own main line. It formed a loop (through the parish of Boltons) from Aspatria through Mealsgate back to the main line at Aikbank Junction. Mealsgate was reached over sustained gradients of 1 in 70 from Aspatria, 1 in 60 from Aikbank. The line opened to goods and mineral traffic on 2 April 1866, but the collieries did not develop as rapidly as had been expected, and the Aikbank end of the loop quickly became disused; track was removed in September 1869. Eventually the coal production picked up and on 1 October 1877 the Aikbank end of the line was reinstated and reopened. Passenger traffic from Aspatria to Mealsgate began 26 December 1866; the intermediate station of Baggrow led to the name "the Baggra Bus" being given to the branch passenger train. On the reopening of the Aikbank end of the loop, a single daily mixed train ran on that also.

=== The Derwent branch ===
Maryport and Carlisle Railway Act 1865
- Act of Parliament
- Parliament of the United Kingdom
- Long title: An Act to enable the Maryport and Carlisle Railway Company to construct "The Derwent Branch Railway;" to enlarge the Bull Gill Station; to purchase additional Lands; to raise further Monies; and for other Purposes.
- Citation: 28 & 29 Vict. c. lxxxiv

Dates
- Royal assent: 19 June 1865

Text of statute as originally enacted

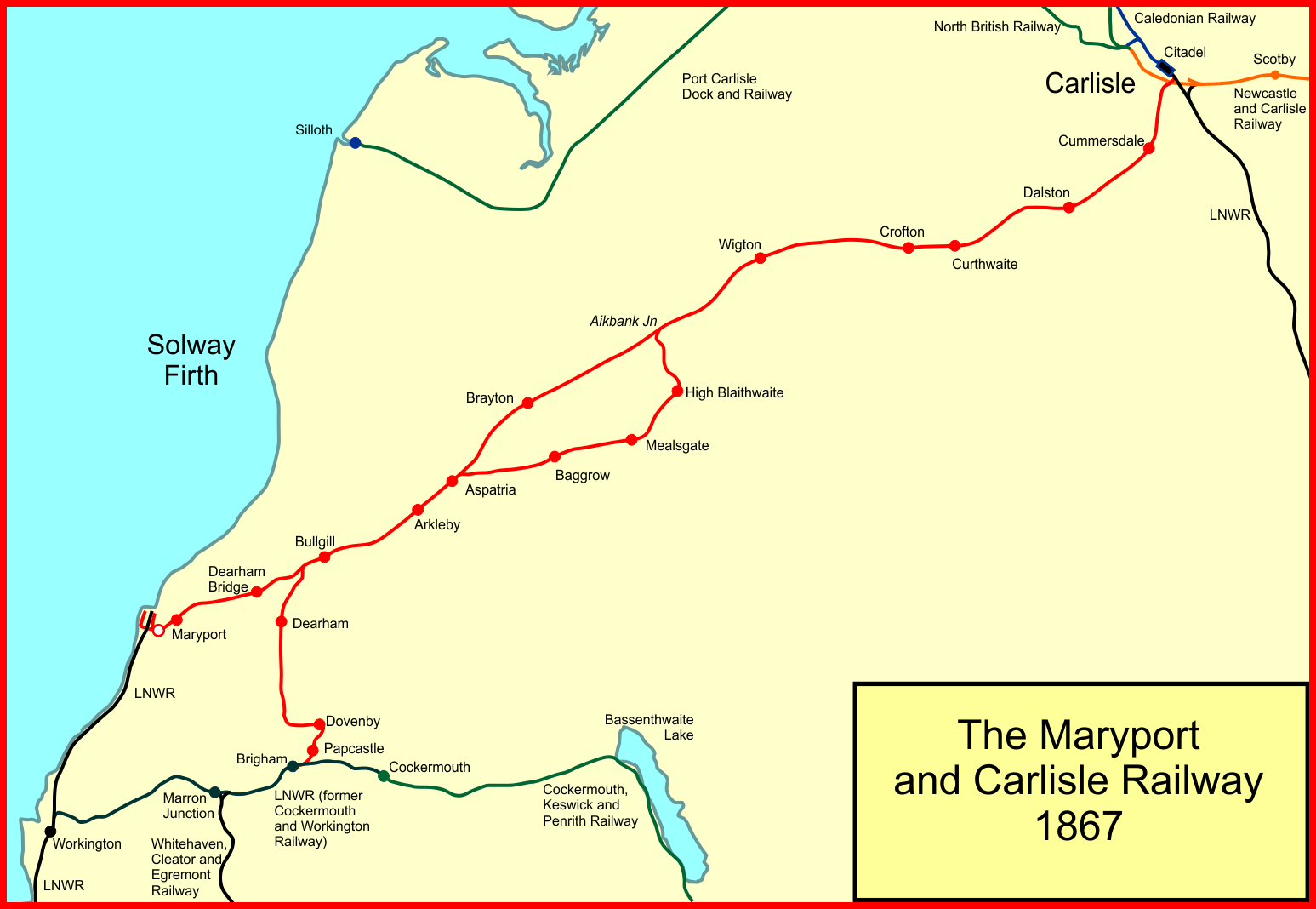
System map of the Maryport and Carlisle Railway in 1867

By the 1860s West Cumberland was producing huge quantities of coal, and (south of the area through which the M&CR ran) of good quality haematite iron ore, free of phosphorus and hence of a composition particularly suitable for the Bessemer process of steel making. An M&C shareholders' meeting in 1864 was told that 660,000 long tons (670,000 t) of ore had been mined in 1863, about a quarter of this going to Scotland by rail or by sea. Ironworks set up to smelt the ore locally found West Cumberland coal unsuitable, and better quality coal (or coke) had to be imported. The profits of the incumbent railways were correspondingly excellent; the M&CR over which much of the export of haematite to Scotland took place was paying dividends of 13% in 1873. Larger railway networks from outside the area started to take an interest and to defend its interests the M&CR promoted a parliamentary bill in 1865 to amalgamate with or lease five local companies. That found no support from the other companies and did not proceed, but to protect its territory the M&CR had also promoted the Derwent branch of 6 miles (10 km) in the same session, and that was authorised as the Maryport and Carlisle Railway Act 1865 (28 & 29 Vict. c. lxxxiv) on 19 June 1865. It was to run from a junction at Bullgill to Brigham on the Cockermouth and Workington Railway and usefully shorten the route between the west Cumberland orefield and the Solway Viaduct.

While the line was being built, the London and North Western Railway (LNWR, successor to the Lancaster and Carlisle Railway) acquired the Whitehaven Junction Railway and the Cockermouth and Workington Railway: exactly the outcome the M&CR had hoped to fend off. In self-defence, the M&CR deposited a bill for running powers over those lines that had been friendly before the takeover, but the LNWR negotiated terms on 2 April 1866: the M&CR got running powers east from Brigham to Cockermouth and west to the triangular Marron Junction; and four passenger services were to be operated daily by the LNWR from Maryport to Whitehaven in connection with Carlisle trains there. The M&CR also secured a traffic sharing agreement for mineral traffic destined for Scotland: one half of such traffic arising from the ore field would run via Marron Junction, from where the M&CR would convey it northwards; the other half would travel via Whitehaven. The line opened to goods and mineral traffic on 12 April 1867 (about 50,000 long tons [51,000 t] of iron ore passing over it in the first half of 1868), and to passengers on 1 June 1867 (a through passenger service ran from Maryport to Cockermouth, reversing at Bullgill and again at Brigham).

The Cleator and Workington Junction Railway obtained the Cleator and Workington Junction Railway Act 1883 (46 & 47 Vict. c. cxviii) to build a line from Calva Junction, immediately north of Workington, to Brayton, where the Solway Junction Railway made a junction with the M&CR, with a view to getting direct access to Scotland via the Solway Viaduct. This was intended to lessen the dependence of the C&WJR on the L&NWR; in the event the Cleator and Workington came to an agreement with the M&CR, and the new line ran from Calva Junction only to Linefoot, on the M&CR Derwent branch, the M&CR granted running powers between there and Brayton. The line was 6 1/2 miles (10.5 km) long and very steeply graded; it opened to mineral traffic on 24 March 1887. A passenger service operated at the southern end, as far as Seaton, but except for a brief (September to November 1908) attempt at a Workington–Linefoot service only excursions and special passenger trains operated throughout,

== Boom and bust for iron ==
In the 1880s the iron industry continued to expand considerably, and if the focus of the processing of iron was at Workington, the principal port for export was Maryport. In 1884 Senhouse Dock there further expanded its facilities.

The boom was slowed somewhat by improvements in steelmaking (particularly the introduction of the Gilchrist Thomas 'basic' process, which by using a reactive lining allowed Bessemer converters to use ores with higher phosphorus content) and by the availability of cheap iron ore from Spain. However World War I increased demand and impeded overseas supply, so the local industry revived for a time.

After 1918 a steep decline set in, with changes in the structure of the industry and increasing difficulty in mining haematite. One consequence of this was the closure of the Solway Viaduct by the Caledonian Railway which had taken over the Solway Junction Railway; from May 1922 the Maryport and Carlisle Railway worked trains (Abbey Junction to Brayton) on the Caledonian line south of the Solway which was now isolated from the rest of the Caledonian system.

== After the 1923 grouping ==
The Railways Act 1921 caused the "grouping" of the main line railways of Great Britain; this took effect at the beginning of 1923 and all the railways in the area became part of the London Midland and Scottish Railway (LMS), (Note: The Silloth and Port Carlisle lines had belonged to the North British Railway and were now passed to the London and North Eastern Railway (LNER). Some purely internal steelworks routes remained the property of the steel companies.) which at the end of February 1924 shut the Maryport carriage waggon and locomotive shops 'one of the industrial mainstays of the town'. This coincided with the steepest decline of the local mining and ironworks industries, and unemployment in Maryport reached 77% in 1931. The local railways were dependent on the prosperity of those industries, and many of the marginal routes became unsustainable. The Mealsgate to Aikbank Junction section closed on 1 August 1921, and the remaining Mealsgate to Aspatria section closed to passengers on 22 September 1930; it closed completely on 1 December 1952. The Derwent branch closed completely on 29 April 1935. Heavy industry in west Cumberland declined post-war, with steelmaking ceasing in the 1970s and deep mining of coal in the 1980s, and whilst the main line between Carlisle and Maryport remains in use today, the dominant traffic is the passenger service from Carlisle to Whitehaven and (less frequently) Barrow in Furness along the coast.

== Staff, rolling stock and stations ==
=== Locomotive superintendents ===
- John Bulman fl. 1846 (Note: A “John Bulman, Engineer”, born Northumberland St John Lee was living in Maryport in the 1841 census; he was included in a list of 'New Engineers' in 1846.)
- Mr George Scott, ?–1848 (Note: He was with the M&CR before October 1846, when Mr Scott acted as engineer whilst the permanent replacement of the previous engineer served his notice elsewhere, but the permanent post Mr Scott held then is unknown. He left – or at least was given a leaving present – when Hudson leased the M&CR in October 1848.)
- George Tosh, c. 1850 (Note: George Tosh was a railway engineer born Scotland living Maryport in the 1851 census; in April 1856 he said he was superintendent of the rolling stock of the M&CR, and had been so for 6 years; certainly he was already Locomotive Superintendent in November 1850, when a shareholder committee complained that his duties had never been specified. The M&CR advertised for his replacement (at a salary of £800 a year) in January 1870.)–1870: he pioneered the use of steel (instead of iron) in the construction of the company's locomotives, notably the boiler/firebox and wheels. This was the first such use in Britain.
- Hugh Smellie, 1870–1878
- J. Campbell, 1878–?
- William Coulthard, 1898–1904
- John Behrens Adamson, 1904–1922

=== Locomotives ===
The first locomotive was a 2-2-2 was built by the local firm Tulk and Ley of Lowca and delivered to Maryport by sea on a raft. Christened the Ellen, she had two cylinders (diameter 12 in [30 cm], stroke 18 in [46 cm]) driving her 5-foot (150 cm) driving wheels, and weighed over 12 long tons (12 t). A second locomotive, the Brayton "of immense power" (an 0-6-0 with 4 ft 6 in [137 cm] wheels) was delivered in July 1841 to assist with the coal traffic.

In the following fourteen years five more engines were acquired from Lowca; a 2-2-2 named Harrison arrived in 1843, followed by two 0-4-2s: Lowca and Harris in 1845. A similar engine, named Cocker arrived in 1847. The final engine from Tulk and Ley was a 4-2-0 Crampton locomotive, in 1854. This was works no. 17 and M&CR no. 12. Seven locomotives were purchased from other suppliers, chiefly from R and W Hawthorn.

=== Statistics ===
An 1857 audit of the rolling stock reported it to consist of:

"4 first class, 8 second class, 12 third class, and 1 composite carriages, 7 luggage and break vans, 3 horse boxes; 4 carriage trucks; 19 cattle trucks; 113 goods and other trucks; 20 coke trucks; 482 coal waggons; and 13 locomotive engines"

The 1912 statistics of the line included the following information:

- rolling stock: 28 locomotives, 56 coaching vehicles and 1,667 goods vehicles of various kinds
- colours: locomotives, green; carriages, cream with green bodies; wagons, lead colour.

=== Location list ===
Note: the date of opening of the first portion of the railway to Arkleby, and of the passenger stations on it, are uncertain. A special directors' train ran on 15 July 1840 but Quick says that the safest date for public opening to passengers is Autumn 1840.

- (Docks);
- Maryport; see note above;
- Dearham Bridge; see note above; referred to in M&C documents both as 'Dearham Bridge'(1842) & (1853) and as 'Dearham' (1864) but 'Dearham' to local papers until a station of that name opened on the Derwent Valley line; closed 5 June 1950;
- Bull Gill; see note above; later Bullgill; closed 7 March 1960; later convergence of Derwent Valley line, see below;
- Arkleby; see note above; closed 1 January 1852;
- Aspatria; opened 12 April 1841; divergence of Mealsgate branch, see below;
- Brayton; originally a private station; possibly 10 February 1845; opened to public 1 March 1848; closed 5 June 1950;
- Low Row; opened 2 December 1844; it was a temporary terminus, and it closed either on 10 January 1845 when the line was extended to Brookfield or when Leegate opened
- Leegate; opened 2 February 1848; closed 5 June 1950;
- Aikbank Junction; convergence of line from Mealsgate;
- Brookfield; temporary terminus opened 2 December 1844; closed 10 February 1845 when the line was extended to Low Row;
- Wigton; opened 10 May 1843;
- Crofton; private station opened about 1856; closed 1929;
- Curthwaite; opened 10 May 1843; closed 12 June 1950;
- Dalston; opened 10 May 1843;
- Cummersdale; opened October 1858; Saturdays only until May 1879 (Saturday was Carlisle market day); closed 18 June 1951 but occasional use until 1961;
- Carlisle Water Lane; also known as Carlisle Bogfield; opened 10 May 1843; replaced by Carlisle Crown Street;
- Bog Junction;
- Carlisle Crown Street; opened 30 December 1844; some trains were diverted to London Road 1848; closed 17 March 1849.

Derwent line

- Brigham; opened 28 April 1847; closed 18 April 1966; junction station on Cockermouth and Workington line;
- Papcastle; opened 1 June 1867; closed 1 July 1921; some later unadvertised use;
- Dovenby Lodge; opened as private station, see below, possibly 1 June 1867; made public 1896; closed 29 April 1935;
- Linefoot; opened 1 September 1908; closed after November 1908; junction station for Cleator and Workington Junction Railway;
- Dearham; opened 1 June 1867; closed 29 April 1935;
- Bullgill; above.

Bolton loop

- Aspatria; above;
- Baggrow; opened 26 December 1866; closed 22 September 1930;
- Allhallows Colliery; opened 1922; closed 1928: Unadvertised halt for colliery workmen;
- Mealsgate; opened 26 December 1866; closed 22 September 1930;
- High Blaithwaite; opened 1 October 1878; (Note: The line opened exactly one year earlier and this date, derived from Greville and Spence, may be a misprint.) closed 1 August 1921;
- Aikbank Junction; above.

=== Private stations ===
There were two private stations on the line, at Dovenby and at Crofton;

A private railway station owned by a lady is a novelty even amongst such novelties... About 3 miles [5 km] north of Cockermouth, in the parish of Bridekirk, lies the beautiful Dovenby Hall. This charming residence and the adjoining estate are the property of Mrs. Ballantyne Dykes, and that lady has had built for her own use and enjoyment a small railway station on her estate. The station is, therefore, absolutely a private one. It is no toy station, either, but a real practical one, and its several rooms and platform are just as well fitted up, and just as properly used, as those of more pretentious stations. There is a booking-office which issues tickets when required, though certainly the "booking-clerk" is not overtaxed, nor has he ever any of the rush familiar to his confrères at Liverpool Street or Waterloo. There is a miniature waiting-room that is often used by the family in residence at the Hall, or by their guests. The small private station of "Dovenby" is on the system of the Maryport and Carlisle Railway, whose whole extent of railway lines does not amount to 50 miles [80 km]. The private station we are speaking of lies upon what is known as the Derwent branch of the line, and lies between the two more important stations of Papcastle and Dearham. In the summer time Dovenby station is quite a delightful spot, and much more attractive to the traveller than most larger stations.

There is another private railway station on the little line that connects Carlisle and Maryport, beside the one already mentioned existing at Dovenby. This second one is at the village of Crofton, near Wigton. Crofton Hall lies about three miles [5 km] from the latter town, and its owner is Sir Musgrave Brisco Bart., who enjoys the rights and privileges pertaining to the ownership of a private railway station on his estate. His station is in all respects a private one, not being open to the public at all. When you travel along the line from Carlisle to Curthwaite and get out at the latter station, you are then only a mile away from the pretty private station at Crofton, which is called after the owner's place. It is a very nice spot to possess, both the residence and the station. But it would not be true to say that Crofton, despite all its charm and beauty, is actually the prettiest of the private stations dealt with in this article.

=== Preservation ===
Only one piece of original Maryport and Carlisle Railway rolling stock survives; No. 11 6w Full Third, built in 1875 is preserved on the Chasewater Railway amongst other significant vintage stock. Unlike most vintage 19th-century carriages, this one has been preserved with its original underframe, because it was sold to a colliery in the 1930s. It is currently awaiting restoration to start with most of the body being intact.

== See also ==
- Carlisle railway history
- Cumbrian Coast Line (history)
