= Wigton railway station =

Railway station in Cumbria, England

Wigton
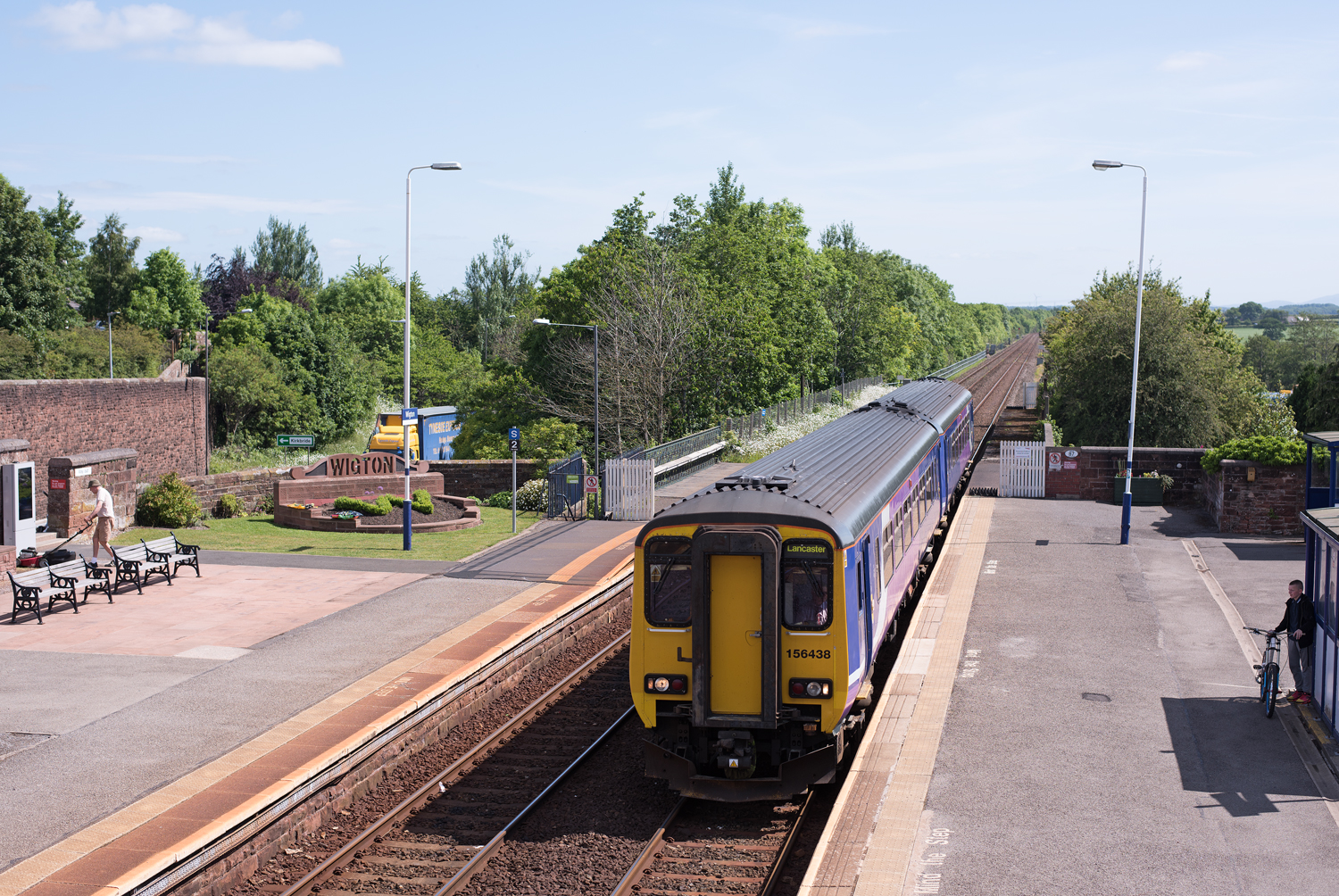

General information
- Location: Wigton, Cumberland; England
- Coordinates: 54°49′45″N 3°09′52″W
- Grid reference: NY252488
- Owner: Network Rail
- Manager: Northern Trains
- Platforms: 2
- Tracks: 2

Other information
- Station code: WGT
- Classification: DfT category F1

History
- Original company: Maryport and Carlisle Railway
- Pre-grouping: Maryport and Carlisle Railway
- Post-grouping: London, Midland and Scottish Railway; British Rail (London Midland Region)

Key dates
- 10 May 1843: Opened

Passengers
- 2020/21: ▼24,662
- 2021/22: ▲64,820
- 2022/23: ▼63,254
- 2023/24: ▼56,204
- 2024/25: ▲64,902
Location
- Location within the former Allerdale Borough Location within Cumbria
Notes
- Passenger statistics from the Office of Rail and Road

Wigton railway station is a railway station serving the market town of Wigton in Cumbria, England. It is on the Cumbrian Coast Line, which runs between Carlisle and Barrow-in-Furness. It is owned by Network Rail and managed by Northern Trains.

== History ==
The station was opened by the Maryport and Carlisle Railway on 10 May 1843, following the completion of the route from Carlisle. It would act as a temporary terminus until the opening of the line heading south-west towards Aspatria in 1845.

It subsequently become the junction station for the eastern end of the loop to Mealsgate from 1878. This portion of the route did not prove profitable, and the single daily return passenger service was withdrawn by the Maryport and Carlisle Railway in 1921.

Goods facilities at the station were withdrawn by British Rail in October 1970. A private siding for the nearby plastics factory remains in place, but this has been disused for a number of years. The station's signal box is still operational, and acts as a fringe to Carlisle PSB.

In December 2018, the Victorian-era footbridge connecting the platforms was deemed unsafe by Network Rail, and access to it was prohibited. The bridge was removed in March 2019 for repairs, and reinstalled in July 2019.

== Facilities ==
Wigton is one of the mandatory stops on this part of the Cumbrian Coast Line, along with Maryport and Workington. As with most other stations on the line, it is unstaffed, and has been so since 1969. The two side platforms here are slightly offset and linked by a footbridge. A ticket machine is now in service to allow intending travellers to buy before boarding. There are waiting shelters on both platforms, but the surviving station buildings are no longer in railway use. Step-free access is available to each platform, whilst train running information is provided by display screens, telephone and timetable posters.

== Services ==
Following the May 2021 timetable change, the station is served by an hourly service between Carlisle and Barrow-in-Furness, with some trains continuing to Lancaster. During the evening, the station is served by an hourly service between Carlisle and Whitehaven. All services are operated by Northern Trains.

Rolling stock used: Class 156 Super Sprinter and Class 158 Express Sprinter

In May 2018, Northern introduced a Sunday service between Whitehaven and Barrow-in-Furness, the first Sunday service to operate south of Whitehaven for over 40 years.

Preceding station	National Rail	Following station
Dalston (Cumbria)	Northern Trains; Cumbrian Coast Line	Aspatria
	Historical railways	
Curthwaite	Maryport and Carlisle Railway	Brookfield
