= MRY =

MRY may refer to:

- Maryport railway station, England (National Rail station code MRY)
- Monongahela Railway, Pennsylvania and West Virginia, US
- MRY, Amtrak station code for Monterey, California, US
- Monterey Regional Airport, California, US (IATA airport code MRY)
