= Maryport (disambiguation) =

Maryport is a small town in Cumbria, England.

Maryport may also refer to:

- Maryport, Dumfries and Galloway, Scotland (on Luce Bay)
- Maryport railway station a railway station serving Maryport, Cumbria, England
