= Aspatria railway station =

Railway station in Cumbria, England

Aspatria
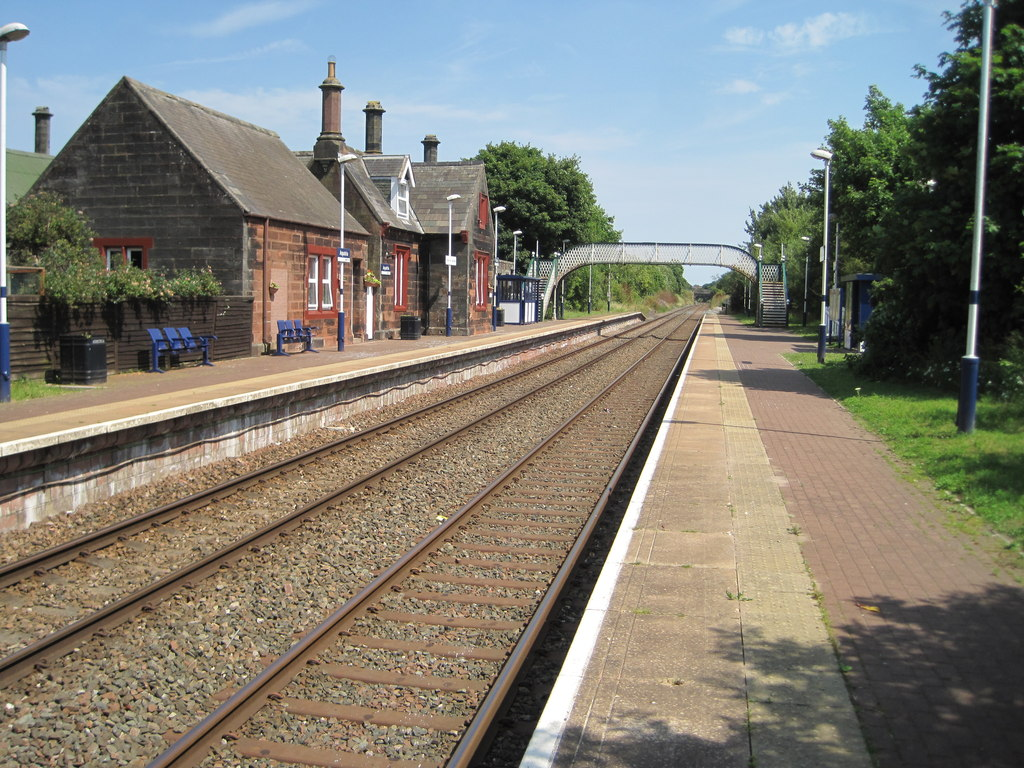

General information
- Location: Aspatria, Cumberland; England
- Coordinates: 54°45′33″N 3°19′53″W
- Grid reference: NY143412
- Owner: Network Rail
- Manager: Northern Trains
- Platforms: 2
- Tracks: 2

Other information
- Station code: ASP
- Classification: DfT category F2

History
- Original company: Maryport and Carlisle Railway
- Pre-grouping: Maryport and Carlisle Railway
- Post-grouping: London, Midland and Scottish Railway; British Rail (London Midland Region)

Key dates
- 12 April 1841: Opened

Passengers
- 2021/22: ▲25,962
- 2022/23: ▲27,878
- 2023/24: ▲28,040
- 2024/25: ▲31,666
- 2025/26: ▲36,232
Location
- Location within the former Allerdale Borough Location within Cumbria
Notes
- Passenger statistics from the Office of Rail and Road

Aspatria railway station is a railway station serving the town of Aspatria in Cumbria, England. It is on the Cumbrian Coast Line, which runs between Carlisle and Barrow-in-Furness. It is owned by Network Rail and managed by Northern Trains.

== History ==
The station was opened by the Maryport and Carlisle Railway on 12 April 1841, although the line heading north-east to Wigton was not completed until 1845.

The station was once the junction for the branch line to Mealsgate. Passenger trains on this line began on 2 April 1866, but ceased on 22 September 1930. Complete closure of the line followed on 1 December 1952.

The station became part of the London, Midland and Scottish Railway during the Grouping of 1923, and then passed on to the London Midland Region of British Railways on nationalisation in 1948. When sectorisation was introduced in the 1980s, the station was served by Regional Railways until the privatisation of British Railways.

The station signal box was the last surviving example built by the Maryport and Carlisle company, prior to its closure and demolition in 1998.

== Facilities ==
The station is unstaffed and has no ticket machine (though one is to be installed during 2019), so tickets must be purchased prior to travel or on the train (the main buildings are now in private residential use). Shelters are located on both platforms. Timetable posters, digital information screens and a telephone are provided to give train running information, whilst there is also public wifi access on offer. The platforms are linked by footbridge and there is step-free access to each one.

== Services ==
Following the May 2021 timetable change, the station is served by an hourly service between Carlisle and Barrow-in-Furness, with some trains continuing to Lancaster. During the evening, the station is served by an hourly service between Carlisle and Whitehaven. All services are operated by Northern Trains.

Rolling stock used: Class 156 Super Sprinter and Class 158 Express Sprinter

In May 2018, Northern introduced a Sunday service between Whitehaven and Barrow-in-Furness, the first Sunday service to operate south of Whitehaven for over 40 years.

On 5 February 2024 Northern was criticised for continuing to mispronounce the station name, six months after its announcements had been re-recorded. The name was still being announced "As-spat-ria" rather than "As-spay-tria". The company said it was aiming to complete the roll-out of its updates by the "summer".

== See also ==
- Listed buildings in Aspatria

== Sources ==
- Butt, R. V. J. (October 1995). The Directory of Railway Stations: details every public and private passenger station, halt, platform and stopping place, past and present (1st ed.). Sparkford: Patrick Stephens Ltd. ISBN 978-1-85260-508-7. OCLC 60251199. OL 11956311M.
- Jowett, Alan (2000). Jowett's Nationalised Railway Atlas (1st ed.). Penryn, Cornwall: Atlantic Transport Publishers. ISBN 978-0-906899-99-1. OCLC 228266687.
- Jowett, Alan (March 1989). Jowett's Railway Atlas of Great Britain and Ireland: From Pre-Grouping to the Present Day (1st ed.). Sparkford: Patrick Stephens Ltd. ISBN 978-1-85260-086-0. OCLC 22311137.
- Marshall, J. (1981) Forgotten Railways North-West England, David & Charles (Publishers) Ltd, Newton Abbott. ISBN 0-7153-8003-6
- Station on navigable Ordnance Survey map

Preceding station	National Rail	Following station
Wigton	Northern Trains; Cumbrian Coast Line	Maryport
	Historical railways	
Brayton	Maryport and Carlisle Railway	Arkleby
	Disused railways	
Baggrow	Maryport and Carlisle Railway	Arkleby
