= Tulk and Ley =

Tulk and Ley was a 19th-century iron mining company in west Cumberland which also ran an engineering works at Lowca near Whitehaven.

== Overview ==
Established on the Lowca site in 1800 as "Heslops, Milward, Johnston & Co."- the engineering and ironfounding expertise coming from the brothers Adam, Thomas & Crosby Heslop, formerly associated with the Seaton ironworks- the firm was taken over by iron-mining firm Tulk, Ley & Co. about 1837. Ley was an absentee investor, the driving force behind the enterprise being engineer John Augustus Tulk. His decision to concentrate on finished goods rather than simple foundry products swiftly paid off, with orders for locomotives from the new Maryport and Carlisle Railway. The first two were a 2-2-2 and an 0-6-0, with a further 2-2-2 in 1843. They then built a number of 0-4-2 locos for various Northern railways. They also attempted to move into the shipbuilding business in 1842-3, producing Lowca, the first iron ship ever launched in Cumberland. Tulk's engineering specialist, a Mr Matthewson from the Tay Ironworks at Dundee, invented an improved mechanism for loading coal onto ships at Whitehaven, and other products included boilers and a machine for cutting iron plates (used in construction of the Lowca).

== Crampton locomotives ==
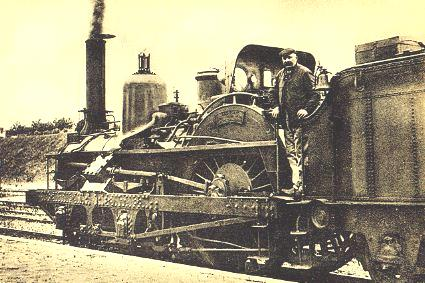
1846 Crampton locomotive

One of Lowca's most significant achievements was the construction of the first Crampton locomotive. From 1847 they built a number of engines to the Crampton pattern, the first three, Namur, Liege and another, being ordered in 1845 by G and J Rennie for the Namur and Liege Railway. The order was undelivered because the railway was not ready. Namur was tested by the LNWR in February - April 1847; the LNWR had ordered a similar but larger engine in June 1846 which was delivered in June 1847. It was named London and was reported to have reached 65mph. In the end the first three Crampton locomotives were all acquired by the South Eastern Railway. One was sold to the Dundee and Perth and Aberdeen Junction Railway, one to the Maryport and Carlisle Railway and two for the Sheffield, Ashton-under-Lyne and Manchester Railway. The rough riding that was typical of Crampton locos, and difficulties with steaming, meant that they did not stay long in service, although they were more successful on the continent, and were an important step in the development of standard gauge railways.

Crampton-type locomotives built by Tulk and Ley, all of 4-2-0 wheel arrangement:

Date built	Works no.	Railway	Name/no.	Notes
1847	10	Namur and Liege Railway	Namur	(1)
1847	11	Namur and Liege Railway	Liege	(1)
1847		Namur and Liege Railway		(1)
1847	12?	LNWR	London, 200	(2)
1847	14	D&P&AJR	Kinnaird	(3)
1847		Sheffield, Ashton and Manchester Railway	Pegasus, 35	
1848		Sheffield, Ashton and Manchester Railway	Phlegon, 36	
1854	17	Maryport and Carlisle Railway	12	(4)

Notes

1. Namur was tested on the London and North Western Railway and speeds up to 62 mph were recorded. Delivery of Namur and Liege to Belgium was delayed and they, with a third similar engine, were sold to the South Eastern Railway in December 1849, becoming SER Nos 81, 83 and 85.
2. The LNWR obtained two other Crampton-type locomotives: Courier, 4-2-0, built at Crewe Works in 1847 and Liverpool, 6-2-0, built by Bury, Curtis, and Kennedy in 1848
3. Dundee and Perth and Aberdeen Junction Railway, absorbed by the Scottish Central Railway in 1863
4. Tulk and Ley apparently built no locomotives between 1848 and 1854, but the source of the quoted works numbers is doubtful.

== Fletcher Jennings ==
By 1857 around twenty engines had been built and the company was taken over by Fletcher, Jennings & Co.
