= Bromfield railway station (Cumbria) =

Disused railway station in Cumbria, England

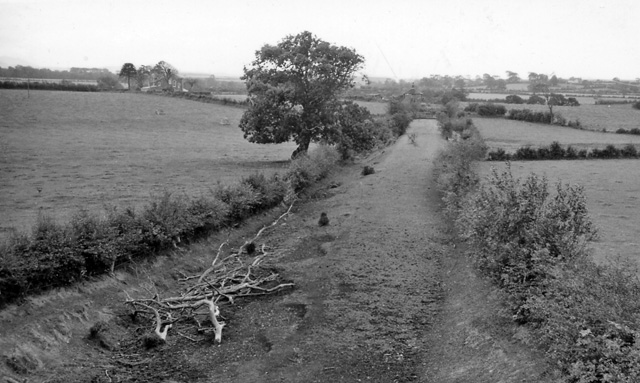
- The site of Bromfield station

General information
- Location: Bromfield, Cumbria; England
- Coordinates: 54.807°N 3.290°W
- Grid reference: NY172465
- Platforms: 1

Other information
- Status: Disused

History
- Original company: Solway Junction Railway
- Pre-grouping: Caledonian Railway

Key dates
- 1 March 1873: Opened
- September 1917: closed
- 1920: opened
- 1 September 1921: Station closed to all traffic
Location

Bromfield was a railway station which served Bromfield, a small settlement in Cumbria on the English side of the Solway Firth. The station opened in 1873 by the Caledonian Railway on a line constructed from the Caledonian Railway Main Line at Kirtlebridge across the Glasgow South Western Line, then forming the Solway Junction Railway over the Solway Viaduct to Brayton. The line opened for freight trains on 13 September 1869.

== History ==
On 1 January 1873 a crossing keeper was appointed and the level crossing signalled. In March 1873 Bromfield station was opened by the Solway Junction Railway, then part of the Caledonian Railway and at first the station was a request stop. At the south end of the station was a siding leading to the goods yard, worked by a frame which was controlled by the train tablet for the section Abbey Junction and Brayton. The station siding was provided for Fielding & Company and was 1¾ from Brayton Junction. The station today is a private house.

The passenger service was never well patronised. In 1910 only three trains in each direction served the station, with a Brayton to Abbey Junction working once a week. It was further reduced to being just one carriage at the front of an occasional goods train and in September 1917 this was suspended, but was reinstated in 1920. Passenger services were finally withdrawn in 1921 and the line south of Annan over the Solway Viaduct was closed completely.

The station had one platform with two simple station buildings, one stone and the other constructed of wood. The closure of the station was directly linked to the closure of the Solway viaduct.

The line remained open to through traffic until 14 February 1933; the track was lifted in 1937.

== Micro-history ==
Until October 1895 the station name was shown as Broomfield in timetables. The track was removed from Bromfield in 1937.

== Sources ==
- Edgar, Stuart & Sinton, John M. (1990). The Solway Junction Railway. Oxford: Oakwood Press. ISBN 978-0853613954.
- Mullay, A. J. (1990). Rails across the border: the story of Anglo-Scottish Railways. Wellingborough: Patrick Stephens Limited. ISBN 1-85260-186-8.
- Quick, Michael (2009) [2001]. Railway passenger stations in Great Britain: a chronology (4th ed.). Oxford: Railway & Canal Historical Society. ISBN 978-0-901461-57-5. OCLC 612226077.
- Robinson, Peter W. (2002). Cumbria's Lost Railways. Catrine: Stenlake Publishing. ISBN 978-1-84033-205-6.

Preceding station	Historical railways	Following station
Abbey Junction	Caledonian Railway; Solway Junction Railway	Brayton
