= Naworth railway station =

Disused railway station in Cumbria on the Tyne Valley Line

Naworth
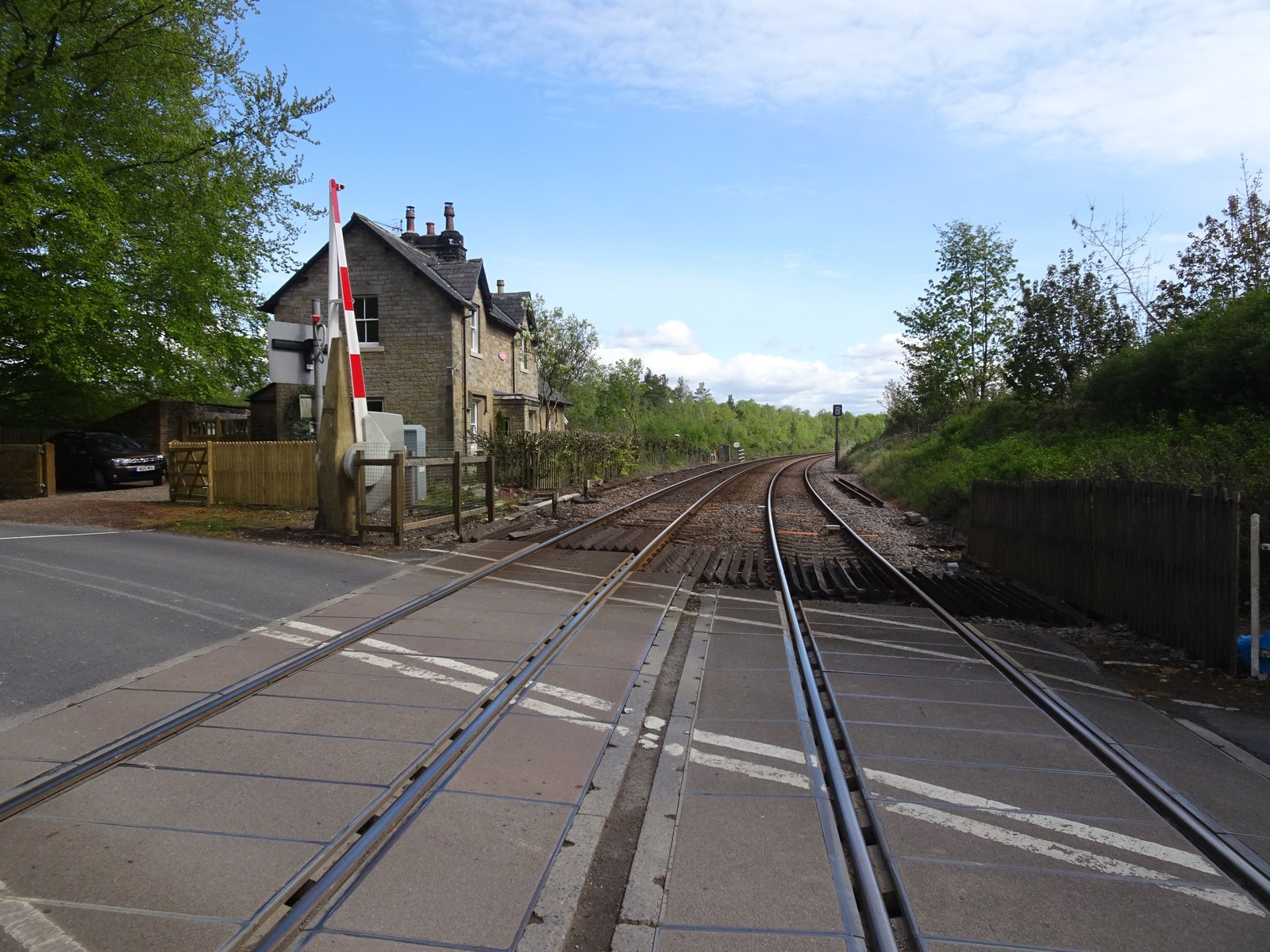

General information
- Location: Naworth, Cumberland; England
- Coordinates: 54°56′53″N 2°40′51″W
- Grid reference: NY565617
- Platforms: 2

Other information
- Status: Disused

History
- Original company: Newcastle and Carlisle Railway
- Pre-grouping: North Eastern Railway
- Post-grouping: London and North Eastern Railway; British Rail (Eastern Region)

Key dates
- 1 June 1871: Opened
- 5 May 1952: Closed
Location

Naworth is a former railway station, which served the hamlet of Naworth in Cumbria. The station served the Tyne Valley Line between 1871 and 1952.

== History ==
The station opened in June 1871 by the Newcastle and Carlisle Railway. However, there are press references to a 'Naworth Gate' station as early as 1867, and it appears on the 1869 Ordnance Survey map so was evidently in operation earlier, possibly as a private station for Naworth Castle. It was closed to both passengers and goods traffic on 5 May 1952.

== 1926 accident ==
On 30 August 1926, the level crossing next to the station was the site of an accident, when a train struck a charabanc which had been incorrectly allowed to cross the railway. Nine people were killed in the accident including the gate keeper, and another three were seriously injured.

Preceding station	Historical railways	Following station
Low Row	North Eastern Railway; Newcastle and Carlisle Railway	Brampton (Cumbria)
