= Cummersdale railway station =

Former railway station in Cumbria, England

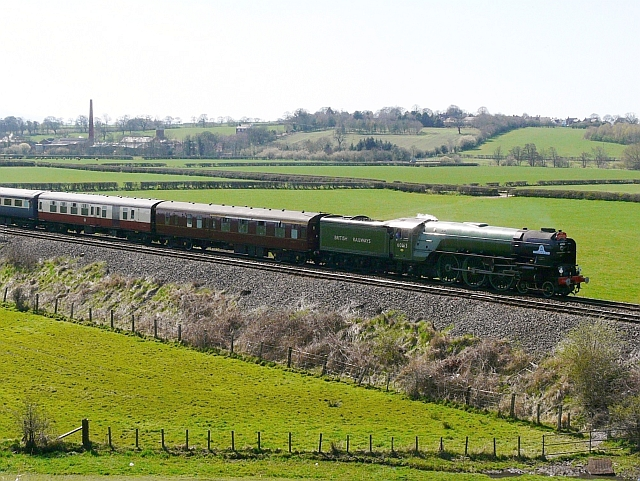
- Tornado near the site of Cummersdale Station

General information
- Location: Cummersdale, Cumberland; England
- Coordinates: 54.8642°N 2.9445°W
- Grid reference: NY394525
- Platforms: 2

Other information
- Status: Disused

History
- Original company: Maryport & Carlisle Railway
- Post-grouping: London Midland and Scottish Railway

Key dates
- 1858: Opened
- 18 June 1951: Station closed to passengers
- 1961: Station closed to goods
Location

Cummersdale was a railway station on the Maryport and Carlisle Railway (M&CR) serving Cummersdale in Cumbria. The station was opened by the M&CR in 1858 and lay in the Parish of Cummersdale near to the village of High Cummersdale.

== History ==
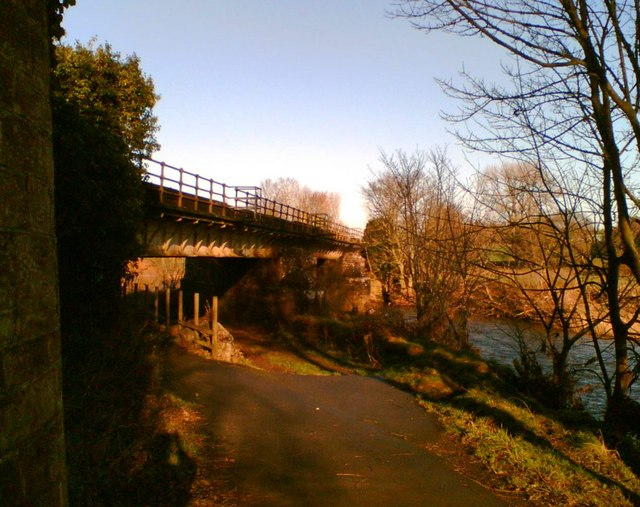
Cummersdale Viaduct and the Caldew river.

Cummersdale station was opened by the Maryport & Carlisle Railway in 1858. At grouping in 1923 the M&CR became a part of the London, Midland and Scottish Railway. It was one of several lightly used intermediate stations on this section of the route to be closed by the British Transport Commission (in 1951) in the years immediately after the nationalisation of the UK rail network. The station was served by workmens trains until the early 1960s. The main Carlisle-Maryport line (completed in 1845) remains open and forms part of the Cumbrian Coast Line between Carlisle and Barrow in Furness.

The station had two through platforms. It lay close to a dye works and overlooked Carlisle racecourse.

George Stephenson was the engineer for the Maryport and Carlisle Railway and his one major engineering structure was the 57-metre-long, three span Cummersdale viaduct which spans the River Caldew at a 52° skew two miles south of Carlisle. This viaduct was the most significant structure on the railway which was opened as a single line, the current twin track viaduct structure was a 1910 upgrade. This bridge was rebuilt in 2012.

Preceding station	Historical railways	Following station
Carlisle; Line and station open	Maryport & Carlisle Railway; Maryport and Carlisle Railway	Dalston; Line and station open
