= Dovenby Lodge railway station =

Disused railway station in Cumbria, England

Dovenby Lodge

General information
- Location: Dovenby, Cumberland; England
- Coordinates: 54.6793°N 3.4083°W
- Grid reference: NY092324
- Platforms: 1

Other information
- Status: Disused

History
- Original company: Maryport & Carlisle Railway
- Post-grouping: London Midland and Scottish Railway

Key dates
- 1 June 1867: Opened
- 29 April 1935: Line and station closed
Location

Dovenby Lodge railway station was on the single track Derwent Branch of the Maryport and Carlisle Railway (M&CR) in the then county of Cumberland, now Cumbria, England.

The station was opened in 1867. It was a private station solely for the use of the Ballentine-Dykes family of Dovenby Lodge, one of whom was Chairman of the Maryport and Carlisle Railway in the 1840s.

The station is variously referred to as "Dovenby", "Dovenby Park" and "Dovenby Lodge"; an image of a ticket bearing the name Dovenby Lodge is included in the standard work on non-public stations. Letters exchanged in 1868 between the family and the railway concern a parcel of land and a lodge at the station.

The station was available for use until the line closed in 1935, though it never appeared in public timetables. Unusually for those times the tracks were lifted not long after closure, with a tragic consequence; when a bridge was being demolished a girder fell on two men and killed them.

== Afterlife ==
In 2020 the station was in use as a dwelling.

Preceding station	Disused railways	Following station
Linefoot; Line and station closed	Maryport & Carlisle Railway; Derwent Branch	Papcastle; Line and station closed

== See also ==
- Maryport & Carlisle Railway
- Whitehaven, Cleator and Egremont Railway
- Cleator and Workington Junction Railway
- Cockermouth & Workington Railway
