= Bullgill railway station =

Disused railway station in Cumbria, England

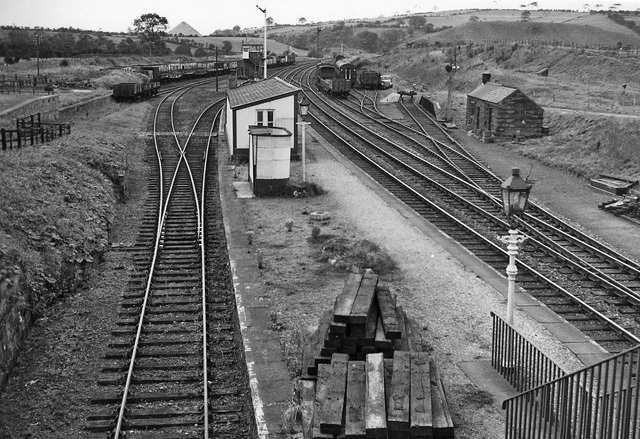
- Bullgill station

General information
- Location: Bullgill, Cumberland; England
- Coordinates: 54.7333°N 3.4070°W
- Grid reference: NY095385
- Platforms: 3

Other information
- Status: Disused

History
- Original company: Maryport & Carlisle Railway
- Post-grouping: London Midland and Scottish Railway

Key dates
- 1840: Opened
- 7 March 1960: Station closed to passengers
- 1964: Station closed to goods
Location

Bullgill or Bull Gill was a railway station on the Maryport and Carlisle Railway (M&CR) serving Bullgill in Cumbria. The station was opened by the M&CR in 1840 and lay in the Parish of Oughterside and Allerby. It closed in 1960

== History ==
Bullgill station was opened by the Maryport & Carlisle Railway (M&CR) in 1840. At grouping in 1923 the M&CR became a part of the London, Midland and Scottish Railway. It was closed to passenger traffic by the British Transport Commission on 7 March 1960 and to all traffic four years later. Much of the station has since been demolished, but remnants of the southbound platform still survive and can be seen from passing trains.

The main Carlisle-Maryport line (completed in 1845) remains open and forms part of the Cumbrian Coast Line between Carlisle and Barrow in Furness. Prior to closure John Joseph Metcalfe was the Station Master. In 2009 the local community recommended that the station should be re-opened.

The station was also the junction for the M&CR's Derwent Branch to Brigham and Cockermouth, which opened in April 1867. Though this line was built primarily to handle iron-ore traffic, it was also used by passenger services. These started from Maryport and ran north to Bullgill, where they reversed. They then continued south to Brigham, where another reversal was necessary before they ran onwards to their destination at Cockermouth. The need for these reversals meant that the modest 12 miles (19 km) journey took 50 minutes to complete. This line was closed to passengers by the LMS on 29 April 1935 and subsequently dismantled.

Preceding station	Historical railways	Following station
Arkleby; Station closed, line open	Maryport & Carlisle Railway; Main Line	Dearham Bridge; Station closed, line open
	Disused railways	
Arkleby; Line open, station closed	Maryport and Carlisle Railway; Derwent Branch	Dearham; Line and station closed
