= Leegate railway station =

Disused railway station in Cumbria, England

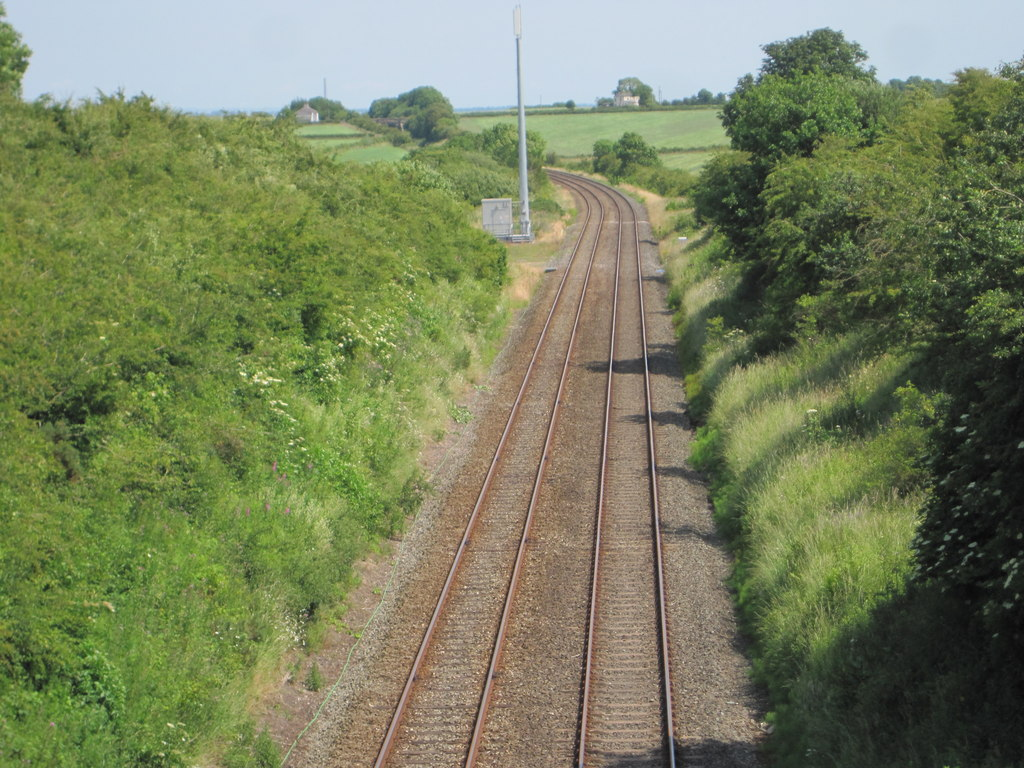
- The site of the station in 2013

General information
- Location: Cumberland; England
- Coordinates: 54.79918°N 3.238507°W
- Grid reference: NY20474561
- Platforms: 2

Other information
- Status: Disused

History
- Original company: Maryport & Carlisle Railway
- Post-grouping: London Midland and Scottish Railway

Key dates
- 2 February 1848: Opened
- 5 June 1950: Station closed to passengers
- 1964: Station closed to goods
Location

Leegate was a railway station on the Maryport and Carlisle Railway (M&CR) and served this rural district in Cumbria. The station was opened by the M&CR in 1848 and lay in the Parish of Bromfield.

== History ==
Leegate station was opened by the Maryport & Carlisle Railway in 1848. At grouping in 1923 the M&CR became a part of the London, Midland and Scottish Railway. It was one of a number of lightly used intermediate stations on the M&C line closed to passenger traffic by the British Transport Commission in the years immediately after nationalisation of the British Railways network in 1948. Services ceased on 5 June 1950, though goods traffic continued to be handled here until 1964.

The main Carlisle-Maryport line (completed in 1845) remains open and forms part of the Cumbrian Coast Line between Carlisle and Barrow in Furness.

The station had two through platforms, with substantial station buildings and a signal box. No trace however remains of the station today.

Preceding station	Historical railways	Following station
Brookfield; Line open, station closed	Maryport and Carlisle Railway; Main Line	Brayton; Line open, station closed
