= Carlisle Crown Street railway station =

Short-lived railway station in Carlisle, Cumbria

Coordinates: 54.887°N 2.9299°W

Carlisle Crown Street

General information
- Location: Carlisle, Cumberland; England
- Platforms: 1

Other information
- Status: Disused

History
- Original company: Maryport and Carlisle Railway
- Pre-grouping: Maryport and Carlisle Railway

Key dates
- 30 December 1844: Opened
- 17 March 1849: Closed

Carlisle Crown Street railway station served the city of Carlisle, in the historical county of Cumberland, England, from 1844 to 1849 on the Maryport and Carlisle Railway.

== History ==
The station was opened on 30 December 1844 by the Maryport and Carlisle Railway. It replaced Carlisle Water Street station, which opened a year earlier. The station closed on 17 March 1849 when all of the trains were diverted to Carlisle London Road.

Preceding station	Disused railways	Following station
Dalston; Line closed, station open	Maryport and Carlisle Railway	Terminus
