= Curthwaite railway station =

Disused railway station in Cumbria, England

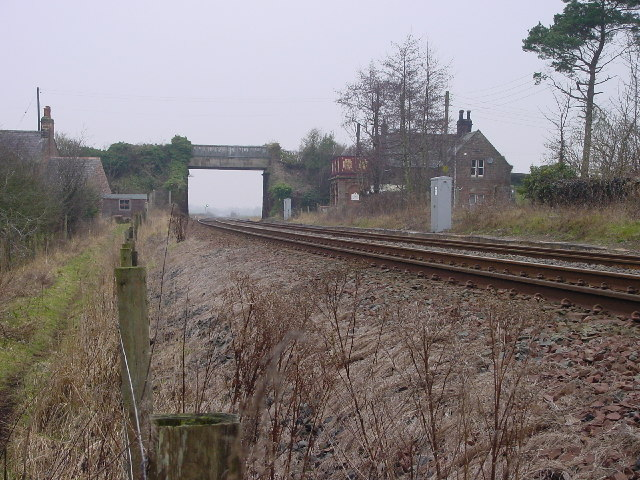
- The old station building and watertower

General information
- Location: Thursby, Cumberland; England
- Coordinates: 54.833525°N 3.050802°W
- Grid reference: NY3260149250
- Platforms: 2

Other information
- Status: Disused

History
- Original company: Maryport & Carlisle Railway
- Post-grouping: London Midland and Scottish Railway

Key dates
- 10 May 1843: Opened
- 12 June 1950: Station closed to all traffic
Location

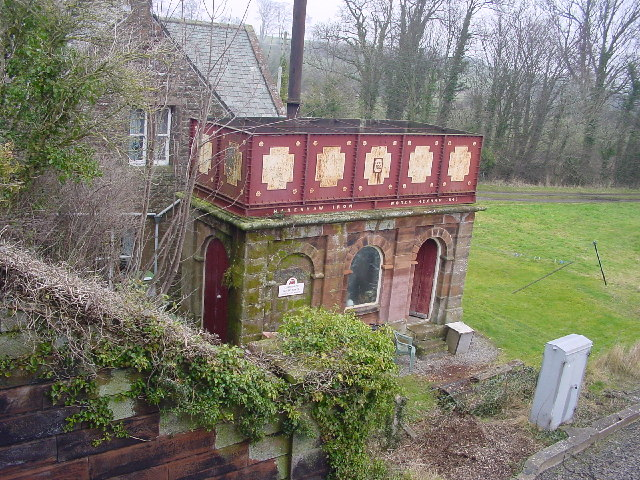
The old water tower.

Curthwaite was a railway station on the Maryport and Carlisle Railway (M&CR) serving West Curthwaite and Thursby in Cumbria. The station was opened by the M&CR in 1843 and lay in the Parish of Westward.

== History ==
Curthwaite station was opened by the Maryport & Carlisle Railway in 1843. At grouping in 1923 the M&CR became a part of the London, Midland and Scottish Railway. It was closed by the British Transport Commission in 1950 (as an economy measure), two years after the railway system was nationalised.

The main Carlisle-Maryport line (completed in 1845) remains open and forms part of the Cumbrian Coast Line between Carlisle and Barrow in Furness.

The station had two through platforms, with a station building that survives as a private house and also a water tower that survives and is now a listed building. The platforms have been demolished.

Preceding station	Historical railways	Following station
Dalston; Line and station open	Maryport & Carlisle Railway; Maryport and Carlisle Railway	Wigton; Line and station open
