= Brayton railway station =

Disused railway station in Cumbria, England

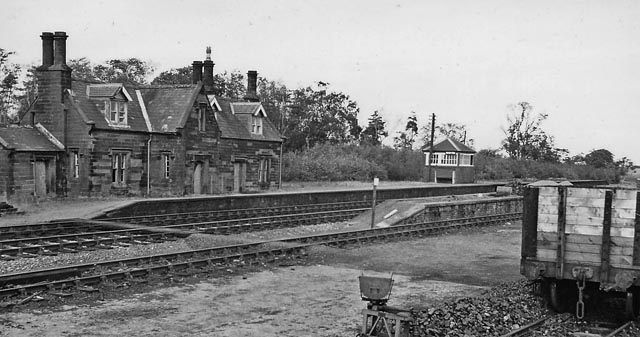
- Brayton station in 1961

General information
- Location: Brayton Hall, Cumberland; England
- Coordinates: 54.7808°N 3.2980°W
- Grid reference: NY166436
- Platforms: 3

Other information
- Status: Disused

History
- Pre-grouping: Maryport & Carlisle Railway
- Post-grouping: London Midland and Scottish Railway

Key dates
- 1844: Opened as private station
- 1 March 1848: Opened to public passengers
- 5 June 1950: Station closed to passengers
- 27 September 1965: Closed to goods
Location

Brayton was a railway station which served as the interchange for the Solway Junction Railway (SJR) with the Maryport and Carlisle Railway (M&CR); it also served nearby Brayton Hall and district in Cumbria. The station was opened by the M&CR and became a junction station in 1870 on the 25 mile long SJR line.

== History ==
Brayton station was opened by the Maryport & Carlisle Railway in 1844. Originally a private station it opened to the public on 1 March 1848. At grouping in 1923 the M&CR became a part of the London, Midland and Scottish Railway. The main Carlisle-Maryport line (completed in 1845) remains open and forms part of the Cumbrian Coast Line between Carlisle and Barrow in Furness.

A shed opened to the east of Brayton at the 21 mile post on 13 September 1869 with two roads, sidings and a 42 ft turntable in the junction between the Solway Junction Railway and the Maryport and Carlisle Railway, used by both companies. On the north side of the station were extensive Solway Junction sidings and on the other side was a through loop that allowed shunting operations to be carried out.

The passenger service via the Solway Junction Railway was never very successful and declined to being just one carriage at the front of an occasional goods train and in September 1917 this was suspended, but was reinstated in 1920. One mid morning train used to run mixed between Kirtlebridge and Bowness, continuing as freight only to Brayton. Passenger services were finally withdrawn in 1921 and the line south of Annan over the Solway Viaduct was closed completely. The line remained open to through traffic until 14 February 1933 and the track was lifted on the S&JR in 1937. The station closed to passengers on the Carlisle route on 5 June 1950 and to all traffic in 1965.

The station had three platforms, two through and one bay, with substantial station buildings and a signal box.

The Brayton Dominion Colliery (Pit No. 4) was located nearby with an extensive railway network.

| Preceding station | Historical railways | Following station |
|---|---|---|
| Bromfield; Line and station closed | Caledonian Railway; Solway Junction Railway | Connection with M&CR |
| Leegate; Station closed, line open | Maryport & Carlisle Railway; Maryport and Carlisle Railway | Aspatria; Line and station open |
