= Brookfield railway station (England) =

Disused railway station in Cumbria, England

Brookfield

General information
- Location: Wigton, Cumberland; England
- Coordinates: 54.820°N 3.182°W
- Grid reference: NY241479

Other information
- Status: Disused

History
- Original company: Maryport and Carlisle Railway

Key dates
- 2 December 1844: Station opened
- 10 February 1845: Station closed
Location

Brookfield (Cumbria) railway station was a short-lived railway station that served Brookfield School (or Brookfield Academy), a Quaker school situated to the west of Wigton, England, for a few weeks in 1844–45.

It was opened on 2 December 1844 by the Maryport and Carlisle Railway, and closed on 10 February 1845.

| Preceding station | Historical railways | Following station |
|---|---|---|
| Wigton; Line and station open | Maryport and Carlisle Railway; Cumbrian Coast Line | Leegate; Line open, station closed |
| | Disused railways | |
| Wigton; Line and station open | Maryport and Carlisle Railway; Bolton Loop | High Blaithwaite; Line and station closed |
