= Dearham Bridge railway station =

Disused railway station in Cumbria, England

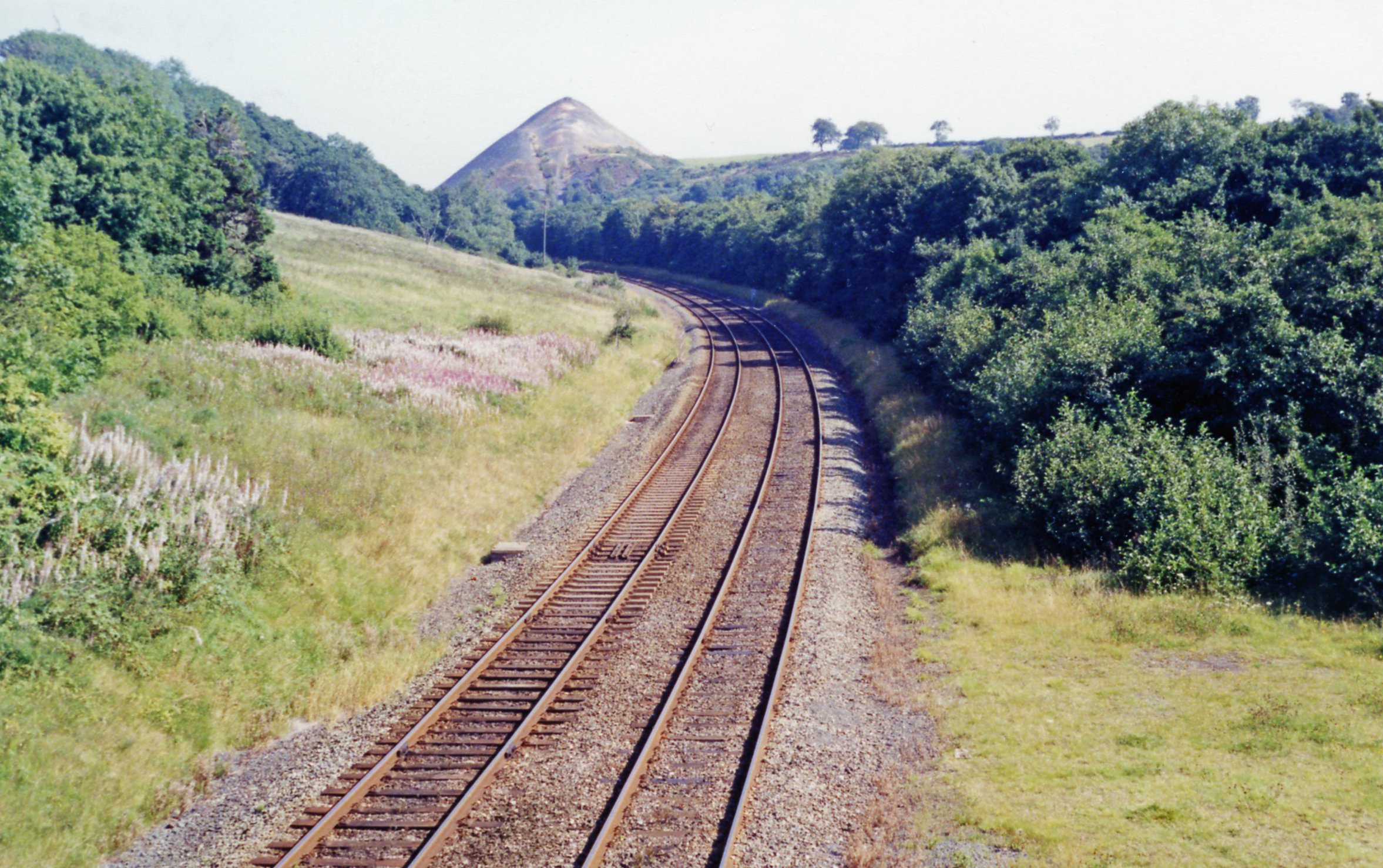
- Site of the station in 1991

General information
- Location: Dearham, Cumberland; England
- Coordinates: 54.721704°N 3.444958°W
- Grid reference: NY07043727
- Platforms: 2 (staggered)

Other information
- Status: Disused

History
- Original company: Maryport & Carlisle Railway
- Post-grouping: London Midland and Scottish Railway

Key dates
- 1842: Opened
- 1867: Renamed Dearham Bridge
- 5 June 1950: Station closed to passengers
- 12 October 1951: Station closed completely
Location
- Location within the former Allerdale Borough Location within Cumbria

Dearham Bridge was a railway station on the Maryport and Carlisle Railway (M&CR) serving the village and rural district of Dearham in Cumberland (now in Cumbria), England. The station was opened by the M&CR in 1842 as Dearham, but was renamed Dearham Bridge in 1867 when the M&CR opened a station in the village of Dearham, to which it gave that name. Dearham Bridge station lay in the Parish of Crosscanonby.

== History ==
Dearham Bridge station was opened by the Maryport & Carlisle Railway (M&CR) in 1840. At grouping in 1923 the M&CR became a part of the London, Midland and Scottish Railway. It was one of several lightly used intermediate stations on this route to be closed (in 1950) by the British Transport Commission in the years immediately after the nationalisation of the UK railway network. No trace of the station now remains, but the main Carlisle-Maryport line (completed in 1845) remains open and forms part of the Cumbrian Coast Line between Carlisle and Barrow in Furness. Branch lines here served Lowther Pit, Lonsdale Pit, Nelson Pit on Broughton Moor, Bertha Pit, etc.

In the 19th century coal was brought down a tramway from pits on Broughton Moor and transferred to M&CR trains at the station.

The station is known for a haunting related to a man who threw his new-born child under a train here, killing the infant. Now, as a train is about to enter the tunnel, the child can occasionally be heard screaming before being hit. The father was hanged for the crime.

The Birkby Fire Brick Works and Colliery was nearby, worked by Messrs. Steele and Beveridge, of Maryport; it gave employment to about forty people.

== See also ==
- Maryport & Carlisle Railway
- Whitehaven, Cleator and Egremont Railway
- Cleator and Workington Junction Railway
- Cockermouth & Workington Railway
- Dearham railway station

Preceding station	Historical railways	Following station
Bullgill; Station closed, line open	Maryport & Carlisle Railway; Maryport and Carlisle Railway	Maryport; Station open, line open
