= Brigham railway station =

Disused railway station in Cumbria, England

Brigham
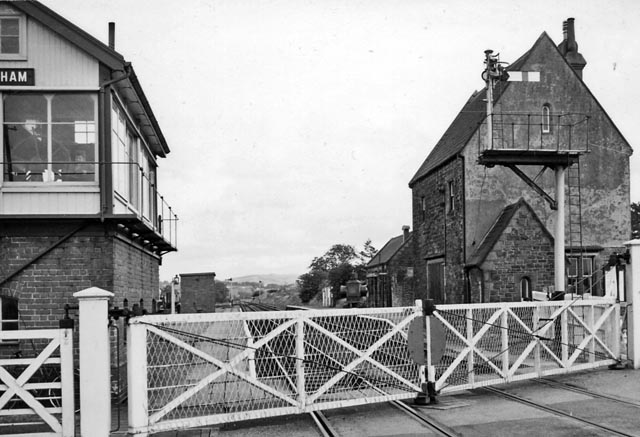
- The station in 1961

General information
- Location: Brigham, Cumberland; England
- Coordinates: 54.66574°N 3.42058°W
- Grid reference: NY085310
- Platforms: 3

Other information
- Status: Disused

History
- Original company: Cockermouth & Workington Railway
- Pre-grouping: London and North Western Railway
- Post-grouping: London, Midland and Scottish Railway

Key dates
- 28 April 1847: Opened
- 18 April 1966: Closed
Location

Brigham railway station was situated on the Cockermouth and Workington Railway at its junction with the Maryport and Carlisle Railway's Derwent Branch. It served the village of Brigham, Cumbria, England.

== History ==
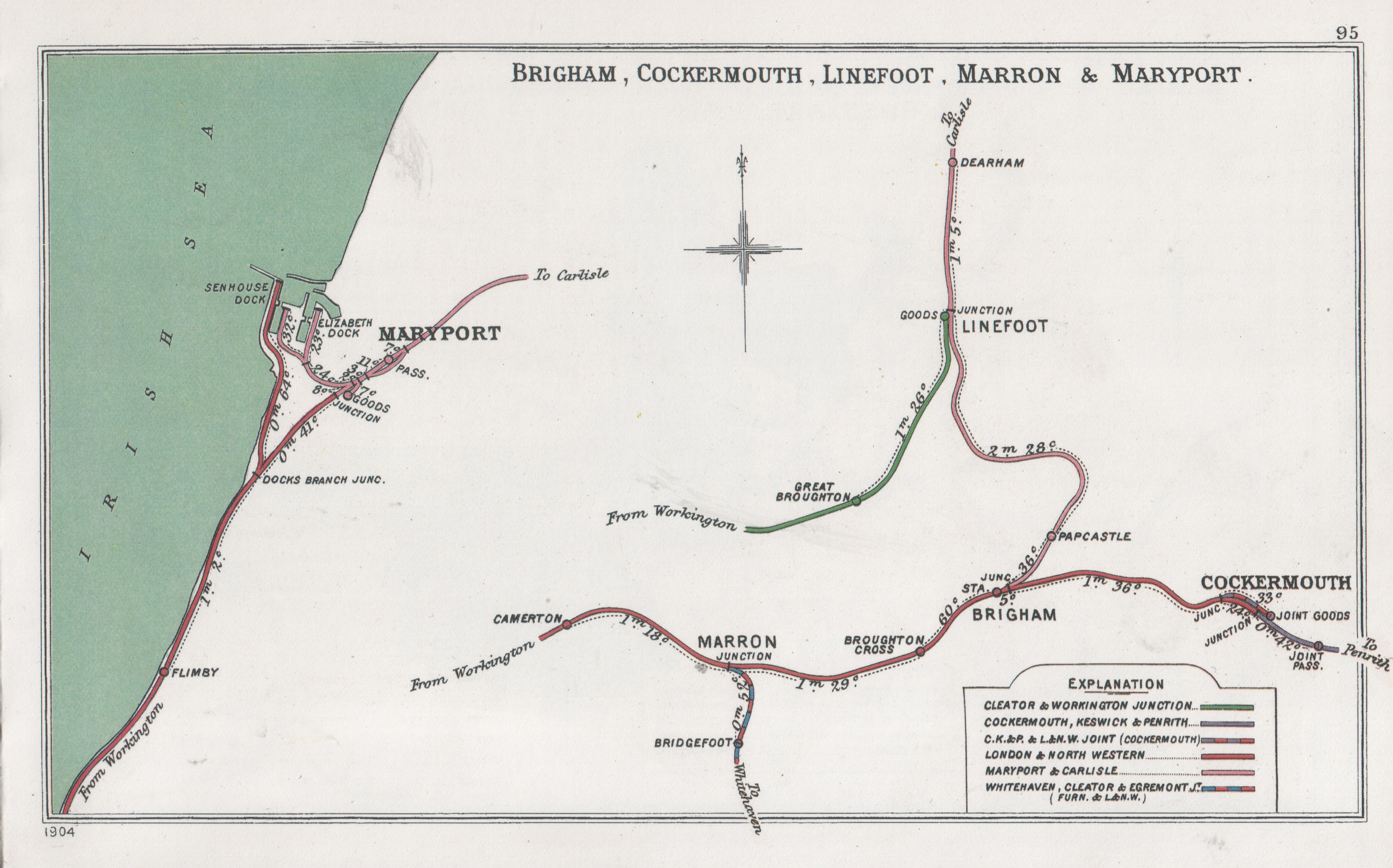
A 1904 Railway Clearing House Junction Diagram showing (right) railways in the vicinity of the station

The station opened on 28 April 1847 and closed on 18 April 1966. The last train was the 20:19 DMU from Keswick to Workington Main on Saturday 16 April.

== Afterlife ==
In 2013 remains of the station and the junction to Papcastle station were still visible by the A66 road before the Great Broughton junction; most of the trackbed now forms part of the A66.

Preceding station	Disused railways	Following station
Cockermouth (C&W); 1847-65	Cockermouth & Workington Railway	Broughton Cross; Line and station closed
Cockermouth; 1865-1966	London and North Western Railway; Cockermouth, Keswick and Penrith Railway	Broughton Cross; Line and station closed
Cockermouth; Reversed at Brigham	Maryport and Carlisle Railway; Derwent Branch	Papcastle; Line and station closed

== See also ==
- Cockermouth, Keswick and Penrith Railway
