= Dalston railway station (Cumbria) =

Railway station in Cumbria, England

Dalston Dalston (Cumbria)
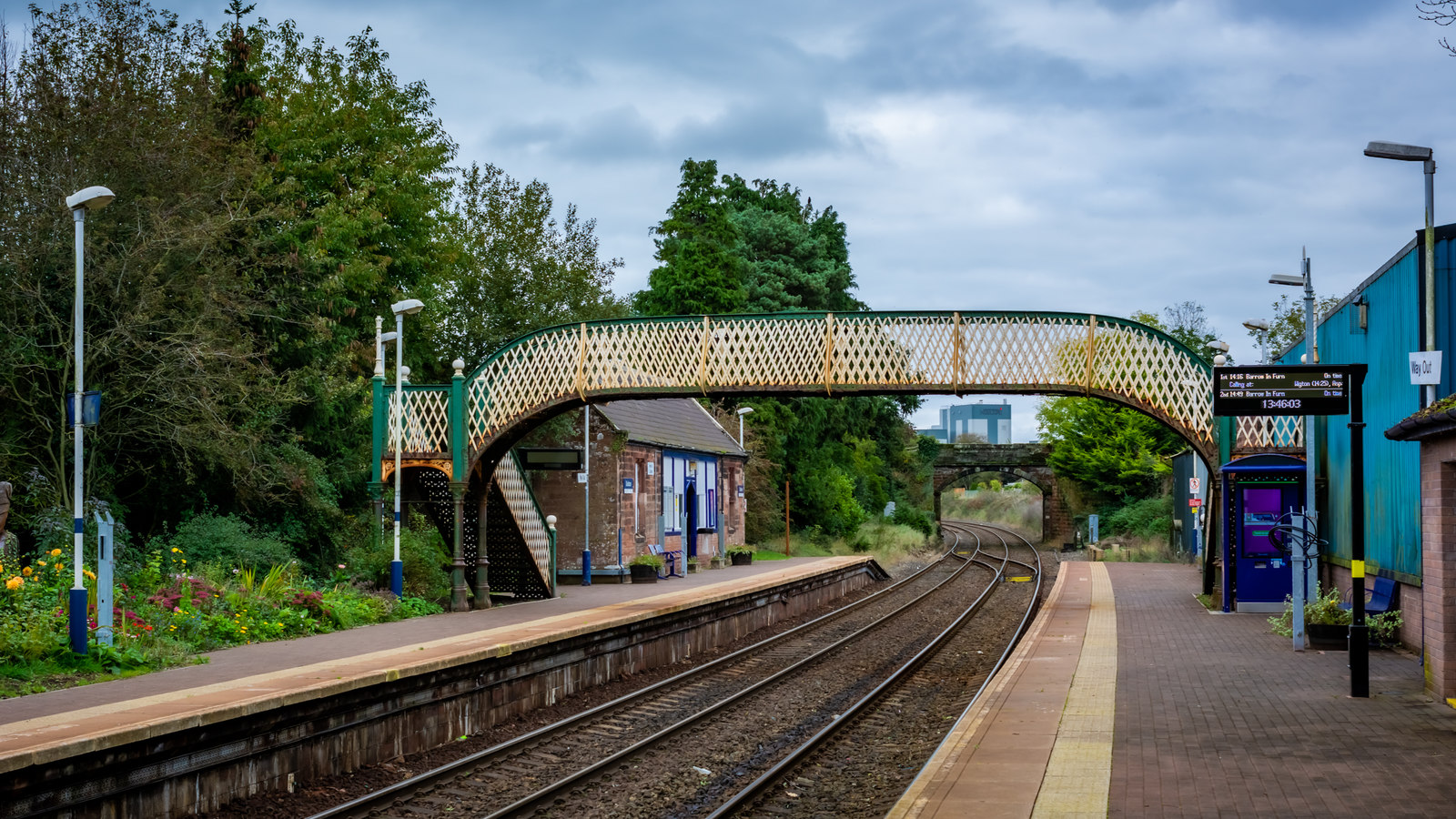

General information
- Location: Dalston, Cumberland; England
- Coordinates: 54°50′46″N 2°59′19″W
- Grid reference: NY366506
- Owner: Network Rail
- Manager: Northern Trains
- Platforms: 2
- Tracks: 2

Other information
- Station code: DLS
- Classification: DfT category F2

History
- Original company: Maryport and Carlisle Railway
- Pre-grouping: Maryport and Carlisle Railway
- Post-grouping: London, Midland and Scottish Railway; British Rail (London Midland Region)

Key dates
- 10 May 1843: Opened

Passengers
- 2021/22: ▲30,562
- 2022/23: ▲37,400
- 2023/24: ▲39,620
- 2024/25: ▲57,392
- 2025/26: ▲63,078
Location
- Location within the former City of Carlisle district Location within Cumbria
Notes
- Passenger statistics from the Office of Rail and Road

Dalston railway station serves the village of Dalston near Carlisle in Cumbria, England. It is on the Cumbrian Coast Line, which runs between Carlisle and Barrow-in-Furness. It is owned by Network Rail and managed by Northern Trains.

== History ==
It was opened in 1843 by the Maryport and Carlisle Railway, with trains running through to Maryport from the beginning of the following year. It became an unstaffed halt in 1967, but has kept its period stone waiting shelter on the northbound platform, lattice footbridge and main buildings on the opposite side (the latter are in private commercial use). It is also one of the last active freight locations on this route - an oil terminal on the eastern side of the line just south of the station receives regular trainloads of fuel oil from Grangemouth Refinery in Scotland. Two crossovers operated from ground frames located at the station are used for shunting purposes when trains require access to the terminal sidings.

== Facilities ==
Along with most other stations on the line, it is unstaffed, meaning that passengers need to purchase tickets on the train. Step-free access is available to both platforms and train running information is provided by telephone and timetable posters. Digital information screens and a ticket machine were installed by Northern in 2019 as part of a rolling station improvement plan in the area.

== Services ==
Following the May 2021 timetable change, the station is served by an hourly service between Carlisle and Barrow-in-Furness, with some trains continuing to Lancaster. During the evening, the station is served by an hourly service between Carlisle and Whitehaven. All services are operated by Northern Trains.

Rolling stock used: Class 156 Super Sprinter and Class 158 Express Sprinter

In May 2018, Northern introduced a Sunday service between Whitehaven and Barrow-in-Furness, the first Sunday service to operate south of Whitehaven for over 40 years.

Preceding station	National Rail	Following station
Carlisle	Northern Trains; Cumbrian Coast Line	Wigton
	Historical railways	
Cummersdale	Maryport and Carlisle Railway	Curthwaite
