= Low Row railway station =

Disused railway station in Cumbria on the Tyne Valley Line

Low Row
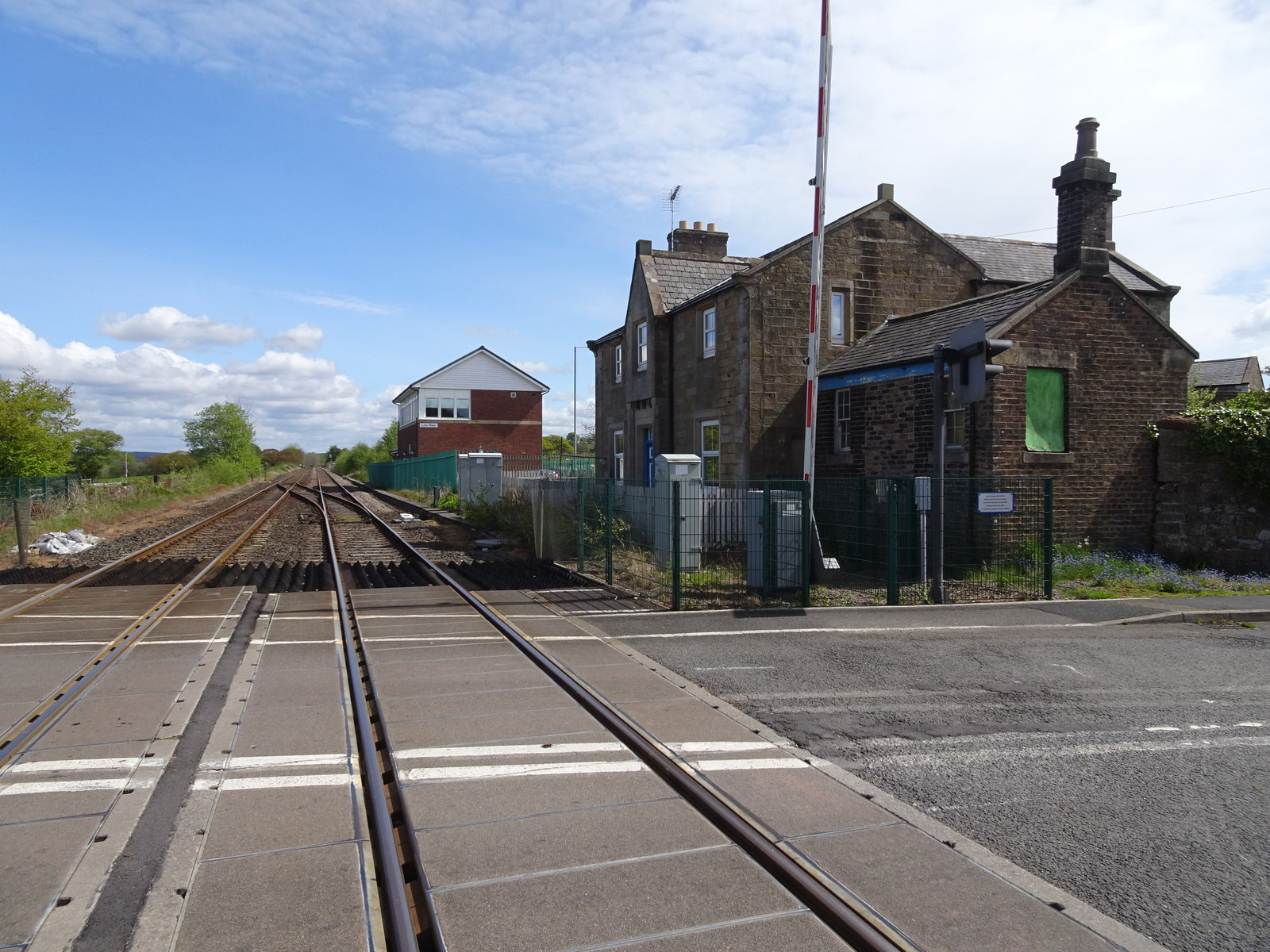

General information
- Location: Low Row, Cumberland; England
- Coordinates: 54°57′39″N 2°38′57″W
- Grid reference: NY584631
- Platforms: 2
- Tracks: 2

Other information
- Status: Disused

History
- Original company: Newcastle and Carlisle Railway
- Pre-grouping: North Eastern Railway
- Post-grouping: London and North Eastern Railway; British Rail (Eastern Region)

Key dates
- 28 July 1836: Opened
- 5 January 1959: Closed
Location

Low Row is a former railway station on the Tyne Valley Line, which served the village of Low Row in Cumbria between 1836 and 1965.

== History ==
The station was opened on 20 July 1836 by the Newcastle and Carlisle Railway. The station was closed to passengers on 5 January 1959 and closed completely in 1965.

Preceding station	Historical railways	Following station
Gilsland	North Eastern Railway; Newcastle and Carlisle Railway	Naworth
