= Arkleby railway station =

Disused railway station in Cumbria, England

Arkleby

General information
- Location: Arkleby, Cumberland; England
- Coordinates: 54.7494°N 3.3515°W
- Grid reference: NY131402

Other information
- Status: Disused

History
- Original company: Maryport and Carlisle Railway
- Pre-grouping: Maryport and Carlisle Railway

Key dates
- 15 July 1840: Opened
- 1 January 1852: Closed
Location

Arkleby railway station was an early railway station on the Maryport and Carlisle Railway, in north-west England, close to the village of Arkleby in Cumbria, closing in 1852.
