= Maryport railway station =

Railway station in Cumbria, England

Maryport
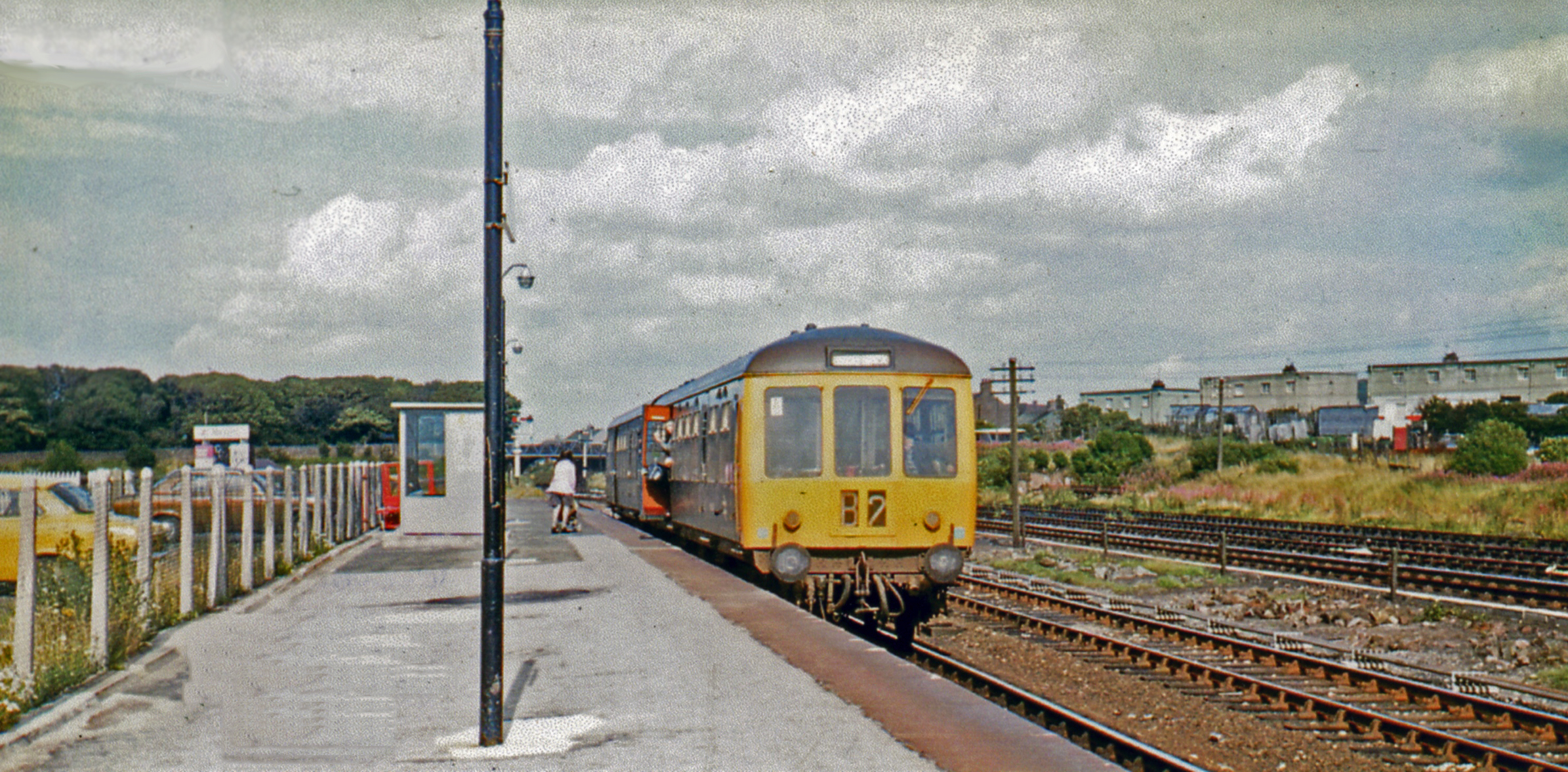

General information
- Location: Maryport, Cumberland; England
- Coordinates: 54°42′41″N 3°29′39″W
- Grid reference: NY037361
- Owner: Network Rail
- Manager: Northern Trains
- Platforms: 1
- Tracks: 2

Other information
- Station code: MRY
- Classification: DfT category F2

History
- Original company: Maryport and Carlisle Railway
- Pre-grouping: Maryport and Carlisle Railway
- Post-grouping: London, Midland and Scottish Railway; British Rail (London Midland Region)

Key dates
- 15 July 1840: Opened
- 4 June 1860: Resited

Passengers
- 2021/22: ▲97,226
- 2022/23: ▲0.101 million
- 2023/24: 0.101 million
- 2024/25: ▲0.117 million
- 2025/26: ▲0.132 million
Location
- Location within the former Allerdale Borough Location within Cumbria
Notes
- Passenger statistics from the Office of Rail and Road

Maryport railway station serves the coastal town of Maryport in Cumbria, England. It is a stop on the Cumbrian Coast Line, which runs between Carlisle and Barrow-in-Furness. It is owned by Network Rail and managed by Northern Trains.

== History ==
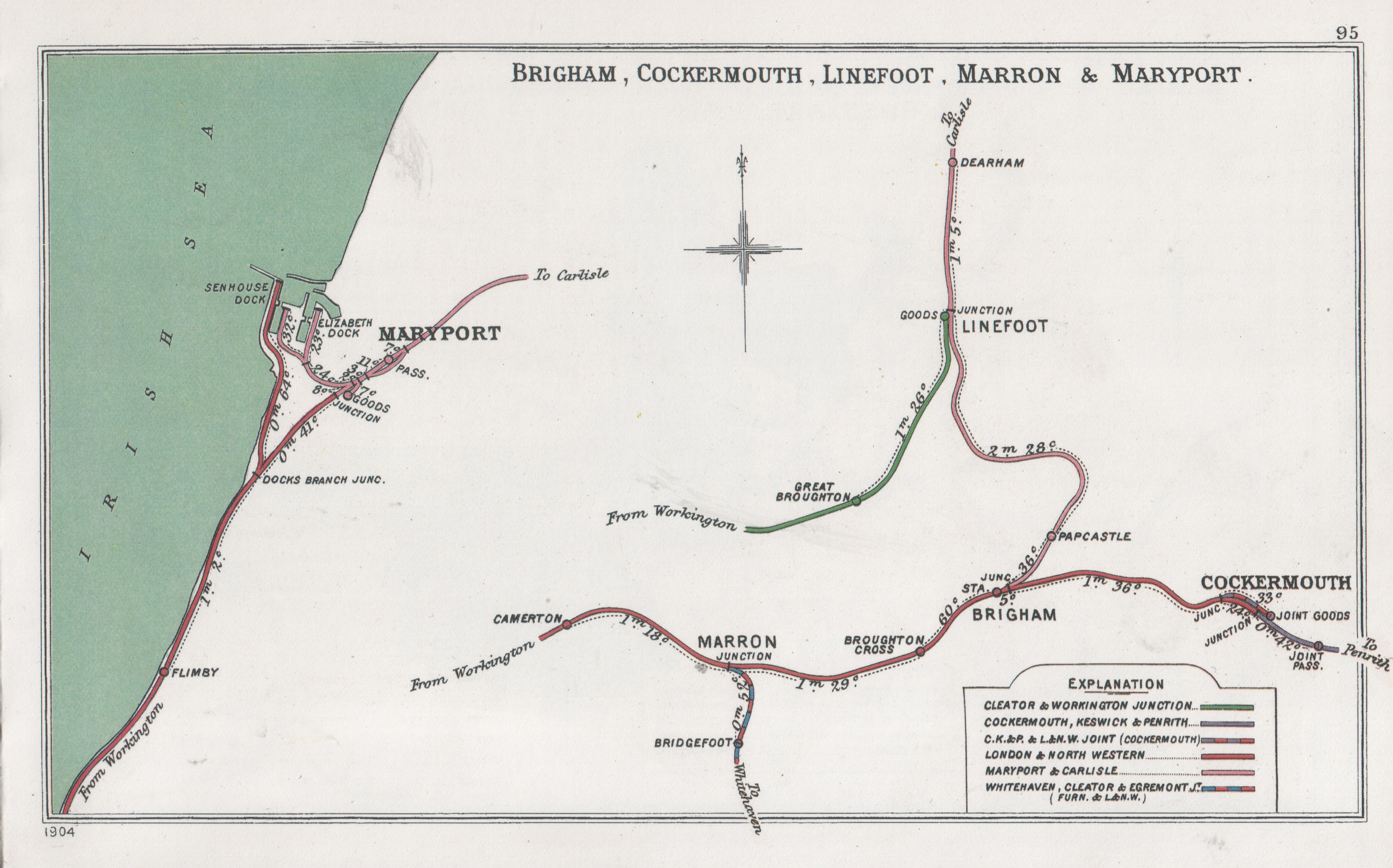
A 1904 Railway Clearing House Junction Diagram showing (left) railways in the vicinity of Maryport (M&C in pink; LNWR in red)

Two railway companies originally served the town: the Maryport and Carlisle Railway (M&C), which opened the line to Carlisle in stages between 1840 and 1845, and the Whitehaven Junction Railway which ran southwards to Workington and Whitehaven and opened in 1847. The latter company was taken over by the London and North Western Railway (LNWR) in 1866, but the M&C remained independent right up until absorption into the LMS in January 1923.

The station is the second to be built in the town; it dates from 1860 and replaced the original 1840 one built by the M&CR for its opening. The old M&CR headquarters formed part of the substantial station building formerly located here, but this was demolished in the 1970s.

In the aftermath of the 2009 Cumbria floods, an additional hourly shuttle service operated southbound stopping at stations to Workington. All services between Workington, Workington North, Flimby and Maryport were free of charge until this service was terminated on 28 May 2010.

== Facilities ==
The station is unstaffed and passengers must buy their ticket on the train or at an automatic ticket machine on the platform. Step-free access to the platform is available; train running information is provided by digital information screens and timetable posters.

A new eco-friendly waiting shelter was erected at the station in the autumn 2011, at a cost of £120,000, to replace the more basic facilities previously offered.

The station is somewhat unusual in that it consists of a single bi-directional platform rather than the usual two side platforms used elsewhere on the double-tracked sections of the Cumbrian Coast Line. Southbound trains have to cross over to the northbound line to reach the platform before returning to the correct line south of the station. This can cause delays if two trains are scheduled to call in quick succession or if one or more trains are running late. Network Rail plans to address this issue as part of a future resignalling scheme.

== Service ==
Northern Trains operates a generally hourly service northbound to Carlisle and southbound to Whitehaven, with most trains continuing to Barrow-in-Furness; no late evening service operates south of Whitehaven. A few through trains operate to/from Lancaster, via the Furness Line. Since the summer of 2025, no through trains have operated through Whitehaven tunnel due to problems with voids beneath the tunnel floor caused by old mine workings. Remedial works are expected to be complete in the spring of 2026.

Train operator Northern introduced a regular through Sunday service to Barrow, via the coast, at the May 2018 timetable change; it was the first such service south of Whitehaven for more than 40 years. Services run approximately hourly from mid-morning until early evening, with later trains terminating at Whitehaven. This represented a major upgrade on the former infrequent service of four per day each way to/from Whitehaven only.

Preceding station	National Rail	Following station
Aspatria	Northern Trains; Cumbrian Coast Line	Flimby
	Historical railways	
Terminus	London and North Western Railway; Whitehaven Junction Railway	Flimby
Dearham Bridge	Maryport and Carlisle Railway	Terminus

== Connections ==
Several bus routes stop in Maryport and can provide connections for travellers using the railway station; the bus stops on the A596 are only a short walk from the station.

Route 60 begins in Maryport and heads north-west up the B5300 to Silloth, calling at Allonby, Mawbray, Beckfoot and Blitterlees; this provides residents of these smaller settlements with a connection to the station. There are also buses heading north towards Carlisle, via Crosby and Aspatria, south towards Workington via Dunmail Park shopping centre, and east towards Cockermouth.
