= Listed buildings in Aspatria =

Aspatria is a town and civil parish in the Cumberland district of Cumbria, England. It contains eleven listed buildings that are recorded in the National Heritage List for England. Of these, one is at Grade II*, the middle grade, and the others are at Grade II, the lowest grade. The parish contains the town of Aspatria and the surrounding countryside. Moat of the listed buildings are houses, and the others include a church and associated structures, a footbridge in the railway station, and a memorial and drinking trough.

== Key ==
Grade	Criteria
II*	Particularly important buildings of more than special interest
II	Buildings of national importance and special interest

== Buildings ==
Name and location	Photograph	Date	Notes	Grade
Dovecote; 54.76536°N 3.32674°W		17th century (probable)	The former dovecote is in the churchyard of St. Kentigern's Church. It is in sandstone with a green slate roof, it is in a single storey, and has a square plan. The building has a doorway, but no other openings apart from open gablets.	II
Lynwood; 54.76198°N 3.33827°W	—	1757	A stuccoed house with quoins and a green slate roof. It has two storeys and three bays. Above the doorway is an inscribed and dated keystone, and the windows are sashes.	II
58 and 60 King Street; 54.76416°N 3.32688°W	—	Early 19th century	A pair of stone houses on a chamfered plinth with a rusticated ground floor, and a green slate roof. They have two storeys, and each house has two bays. Each house has a fluted Greek Doric doorcase with triglyphs, metopes and a cornice. The windows are sashes with plain reveals. On the front is a string course, eaves modillions, and gabled dormers.	II
Dresden House; 54.76426°N 3.32577°W	—	Early or mid 19th century	The house is stuccoed on a chamfered plinth, with angle pilasters, and an eaves cornice. It has a hipped green slate roof with ridge tiles. The house has two storeys and three bays. There is a Doric doorcase and a door with pilasters and a round-headed fanlight. The windows are sashes with plain reveals.	II
St. Kentigern's Church; 54.76488°N 3.32705°W		1846–48	The church is built on the site of an earlier church and incorporates some material from it, including a Norman arch. Most of the church is in Early English style. It is built in sandstone with a green slate roof, and consists of a nave with a clerestory, aisles, a south porch, a chancel with a north vestry and a south chapel, and a west tower. The tower has three stages with a west doorway, a south clock face, a higher stair turret, and corner pinnacles.	II*
Churchyard wall, gate and gate piers, St. Kentigern's Church; 54.76442°N 3.32684°W	—	Mid 19th century	The churchyard wall and the gate piers are in sandstone. The walls have chamfered coping, and the piers have a square plan. The wooden gates are dated 1933, and are carved with oak leaves and vines.	II
Footbridge, Aspatria railway station 54.75899°N 3.33178°W		1870s (probable)	The footbridge was built for the Maryport and Carlisle Railway and is in cast iron. It crosses a double track, and the steps and overbridge have lattice rails with posts that have ball finials. The bridge is carried on fluted columns with Corinthian capitals. There are brackets for lamps, but the lamps have been removed.	II
Cock Gate; 54.77035°N 3.27995°W		1870s	Originally a lodge for Brayton Hall, the house is in sandstone with angle pilasters and a Welsh slate roof, and is in Gothick style. It has two storeys and three bays, the central bay being recessed. The outer bays have gables with battlemented parapets. In the upper floor of the central bay is a circular window. The other windows are sashes with pointed heads and hood moulds. In the right return is a gabled porch.	II
Stockhill Cottage; 54.76654°N 3.29514°W	—	1870s	Originally an estate house for Brayton Hall, the house is in sandstone with a green slate roof, and has two storeys and three bays. The central bay is gabled and contains a doorway with a fanlight, above which is a Venetian window, and over this is a quatrefoil in the gable. The other windows are sashes with pointed heads.	II
Graveyard cross 54.76491°N 3.32662°W		1887	The cross is in the churchyard of St. Kentigern's Church, and is a copy of the Gosforth Cross. It is in sandstone and has a stepped plinth, a tall shaft. the upper part of which is carved with Norse figures, and at the top is a Celtic cross-head.	II
Sir Wilfred Lawson Memorial and drinking trough 54.76366°N 3.33297°W		1907	The structure has an octagonal base of calciferous sandstone, and a stepped plinth with Shap granite columns at the corners, and bronze plaques depicting personifications of Peace and Temperance, and a bust of Sir William Lawson. On each face are bronze drinking bowls, and on the top is a bronze sculpture of Saint George and the Dragon.	II
