= William Slater Calverley =

English vicar

The Rev. William Slater Calverley (1847–1898) was an unassuming rural English vicar who through diligent study and painstaking scrutiny became an extraordinary amateur antiquarian. Although born in Leicestershire, Calverley claimed his fame through interpreting the carved sculptured relics that he and others found in Cumberland churchyards. He made intricate drawings, corresponded with academic authorities, and gave his own interpretations, which he then relayed to a wider audience. Calverley later produced in intricate detail a life-sized reproduction of the famous Gosforth Cross, which now stands in Aspatria churchyard.

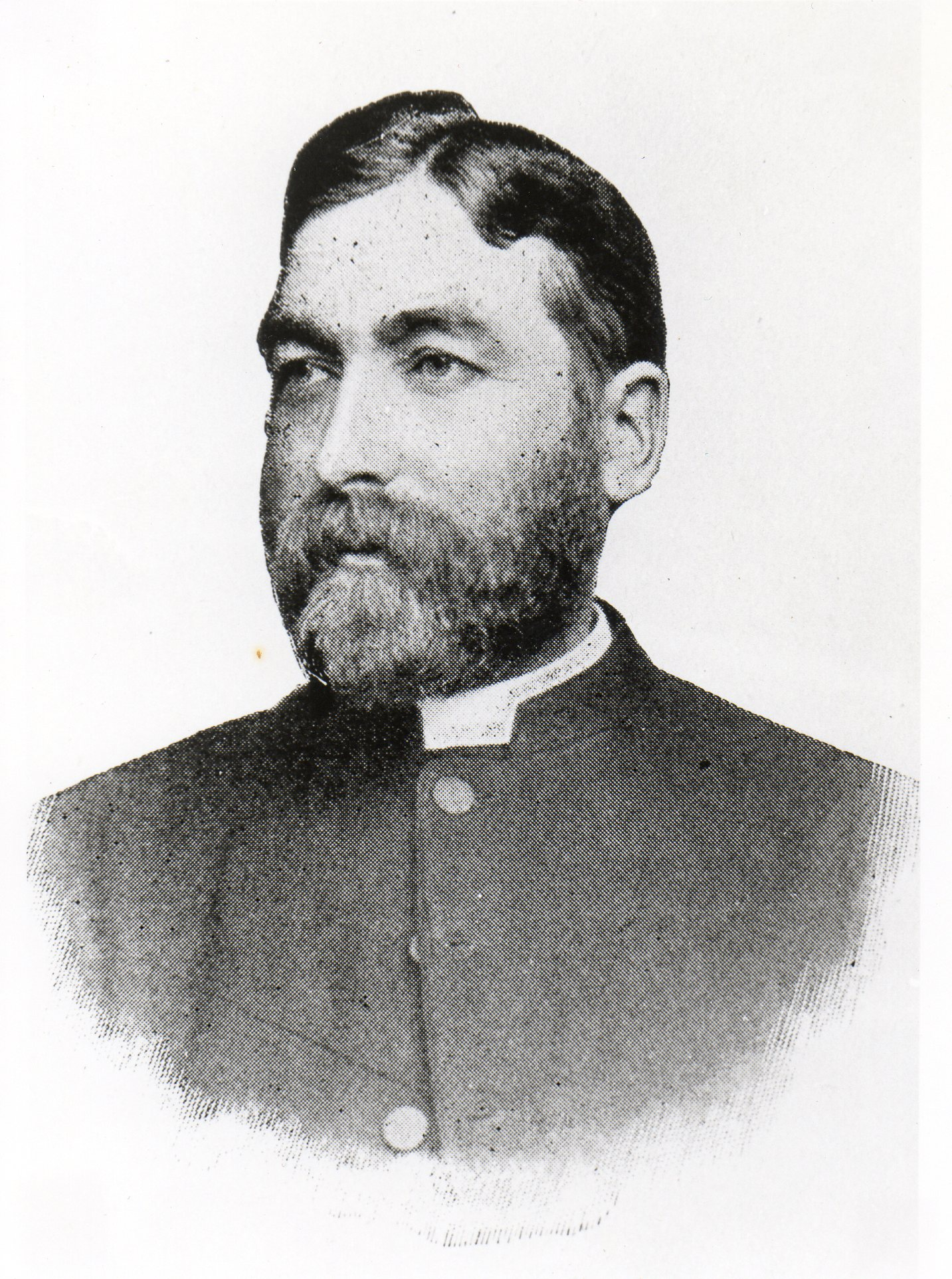
The Rev W. S. Calverley, Antiquarian

== Biography ==
=== Religion and education ===
William Slater Calverley (1847–1898) was born at Kibworth, Leicestershire in 1847. After completing his formal education he entered New College, Oxford, but left to take up private tuition before attaining his degree. During this period he began to study art at the South Kensington School of Art and according to contemporary reports could have achieved the gold medal but for illness. This period of study proved very useful later in life. Notwithstanding his artistic ability he chose to enter the church. He was ordained deacon by Bishop Goodwin at Carlisle, Cumberland, in 1872 and afterwards became curate of Eskdale parish, South Cumberland. In the following year he took priest's orders and assumed an appointment as curate at Maryport, moving in 1874 to Dearham, where he served three years as curate and eight years as vicar of the same church. Under his guidance the church was restored, the vicarage and church yard enlarged and improved, and the district church at Ellenborough founded. In 1885, he became vicar of St. Kentigern's Church, Aspatria. One important feature of his pastorate of Aspatria was the acquisition of a peal of bells for the church.

=== Antiquarianism ===
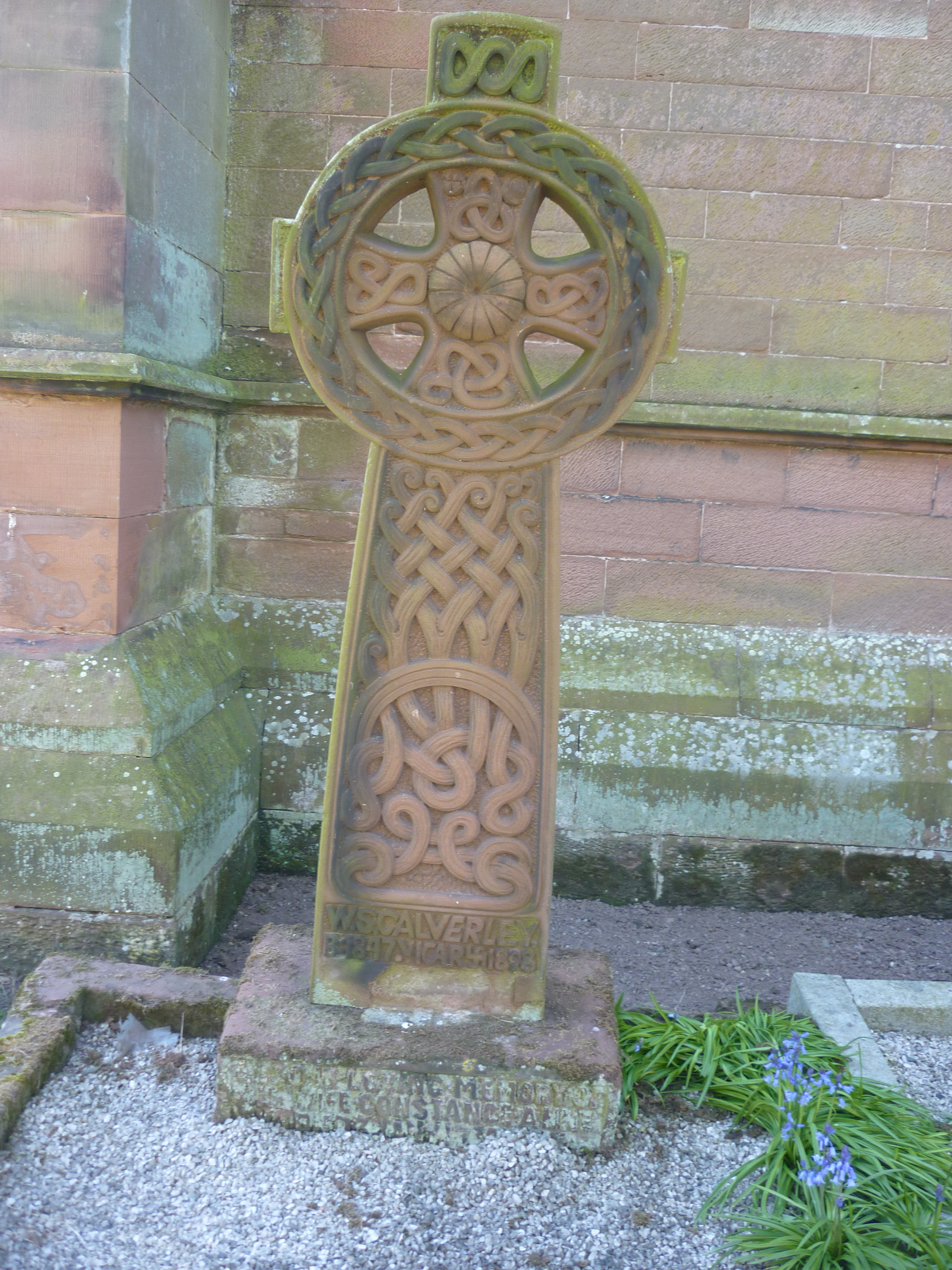
Grave Stone Memorial for W S Calverley at St. Kentigern's Church, Aspatria, designed by his friend and colleague, W. G. Collingwood, and based on the Dearham Cross

Calverley ignited an interest in local and ancient history during the church restorations at Dearham, which brought to light remains of ancient art. Through the study of pre-Norman stones and artefacts he became one of the world's foremost antiquarian scholars. After finding several pre-Norman sculptures he contacted leading authorities, and formed a close working relationship with the English born professor, George Stephens of Copenhagen University. Stephens incorporated and embodied Calverley's discoveries and descriptions into one of the chapters of his book Old Northern Runic Monuments The communications with Stephens encouraged Calverley to delve deeper into the subject.

In 1881 following a meeting of the Cumberland and Westmorland Antiquarian and Archaeological Society (CWAAS) to view Gosforth Cross, he worked with C A Parker to supervised its cleaning to reveal its figurative carvings. As a result, in 1882 he announced to the Archaeological Institute at Carlisle his reading of Edda myths on the Cross. This led to his seminal work, "The Sculptured Cross at Gosforth" for the CWAAS in 1883 The news created a sensation; prior to these discovery authorities held that Christian monuments contained nothing but Christian subjects. Although others had tried to make a connection with Buddhism, Druidism, and Astronomy, Calverley identified the 'Pagan overlap' in English relics. His critics were finally silenced after the Rev. G. F. Browne (later Bishop of Bristol) published his research into the meaning of the Scandinavian legends on the cross at Leeds, and the one at Kirk Andreas, Isle of Man. In February 1891, Calverley interpreted the Völsung myth at Halton in a lecture to the Lancaster Philosophical Society and later that year he read a paper on the same subject to an audience at the Royal Archaeological Institute at Edinburgh.

== Calverley at Aspatria ==
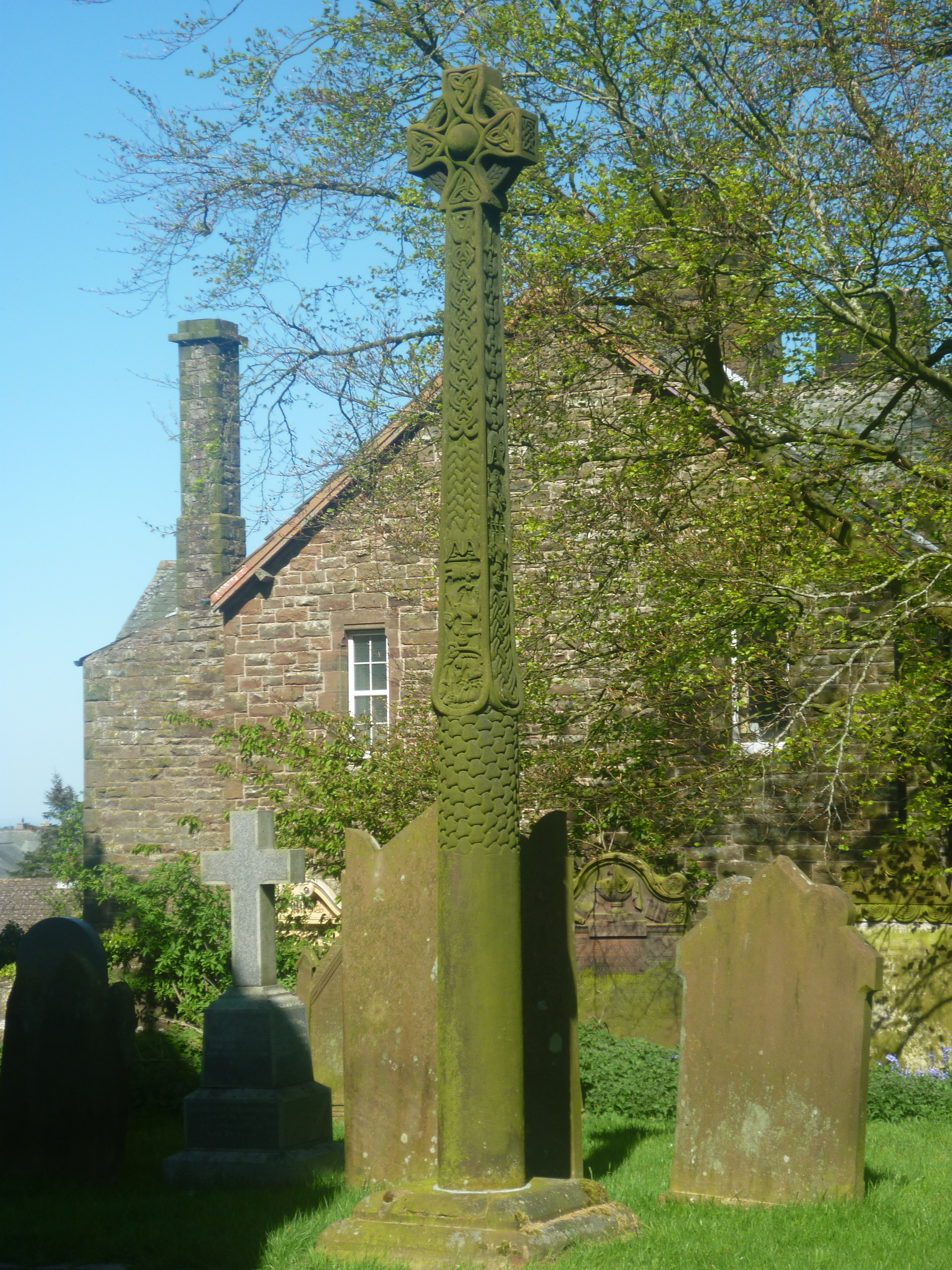
The Replica Gosforth Cross at Aspatria

As vicar at Aspatria, Calverley began to study the ancient relics of that parish. He made intricate drawings of the 'Standing Cross', which at that time stood in its own rectangular socket in the south side of the churchyard, and compared its markings to other artefacts in the county. He also studied the Saxon hogbacks, the swastikas, the two spiral shafts, the spiral fragments and began to draw conclusions, which related to the age and importance of the site of the ancient church. Having realised the importance of these relics he removed them to the vestry. All of his conclusions remain his testimony today. However, it was his interpretation of the meaning of the spiral markings on the Gosforth Cross which assured his fame. Not content to make sketches of the carvings, Calverley determined to make an exact life-size reproduction a means of understanding the Masonic mystery of the sculpture. Aspatria parish is rich in red freestone and in due course he acquired from the local quarries, a solid piece of rock 2 feet wide, 2 feet thick and 16 feet long. With the aid of a retired master mason he carved out the cross and then proceeded with the carving. He reproduced the markings in intricate detail and the replica cross now stands in its own socket in the east end of Aspatria churchyard, a few feet away from Calverley's final resting place. As to the significance of the Gosforth Cross; Stephens, on visiting the site, pronounced it, "one of the costliest olden Roods in Europe" – unique in all his experience, and "probably of seventh century date." In Calverley's opinion it was a Christian monument, not an heathen pillar surmounted by a cross. He described it as an "elaborately carved Christian cross set in a socket of three Calvary steps.".

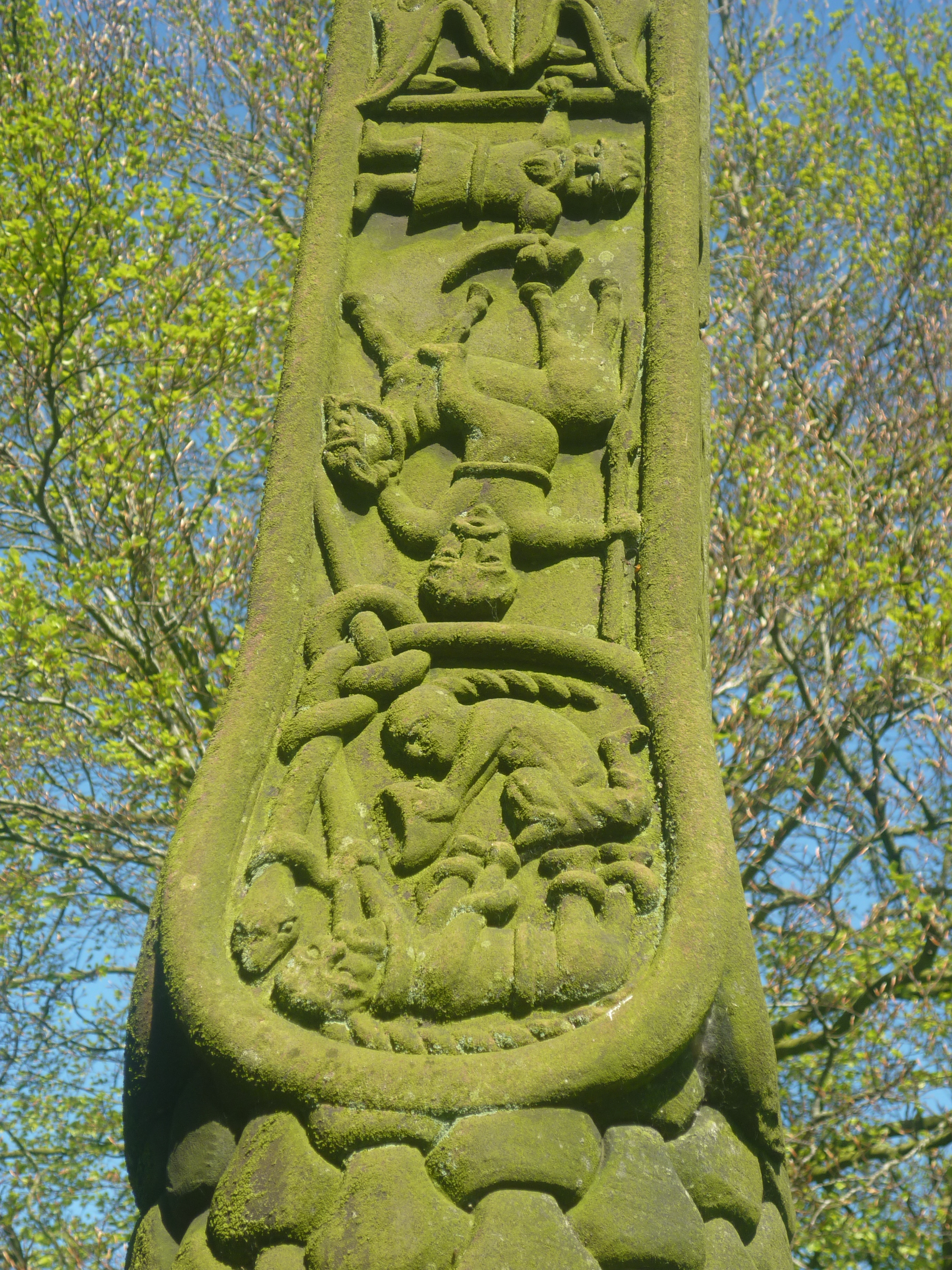
Some of the decorations on the Replica Gosforth Cross 1

== Academic achievements ==
Calverley was elected F.S.A. (Fellow of the Society of Antiquaries) in 1885, and in that capacity served as the Cumberland secretary, reporting new finds. He was also a member of the Royal Archaeological Institute, and a Fellow of the Royal Historical Society. In addition to delivering a large number of technical papers to a variety of Societies and historical organisations he was heavily involved in the excavation of the Hardknott Roman Fort, South Cumberland. He also became one of the committee of experts who superintended the exploration of Hadrian's Wall in northern England. He died before the publication of his magnum opus entitled Notes on the Early Sculptured Crosses, Shrines and Monuments in the Present Diocese of Carlisle, which was published in 1898 with W. G. Collingwood as editor.

== Civic duties ==
Calverley took a keen interest in the affairs of Aspatria. He occupied a seat on the Local Board, and afterwards the Aspatria Urban District Council. He also had a position on the Aspatria and Brayton School Board.

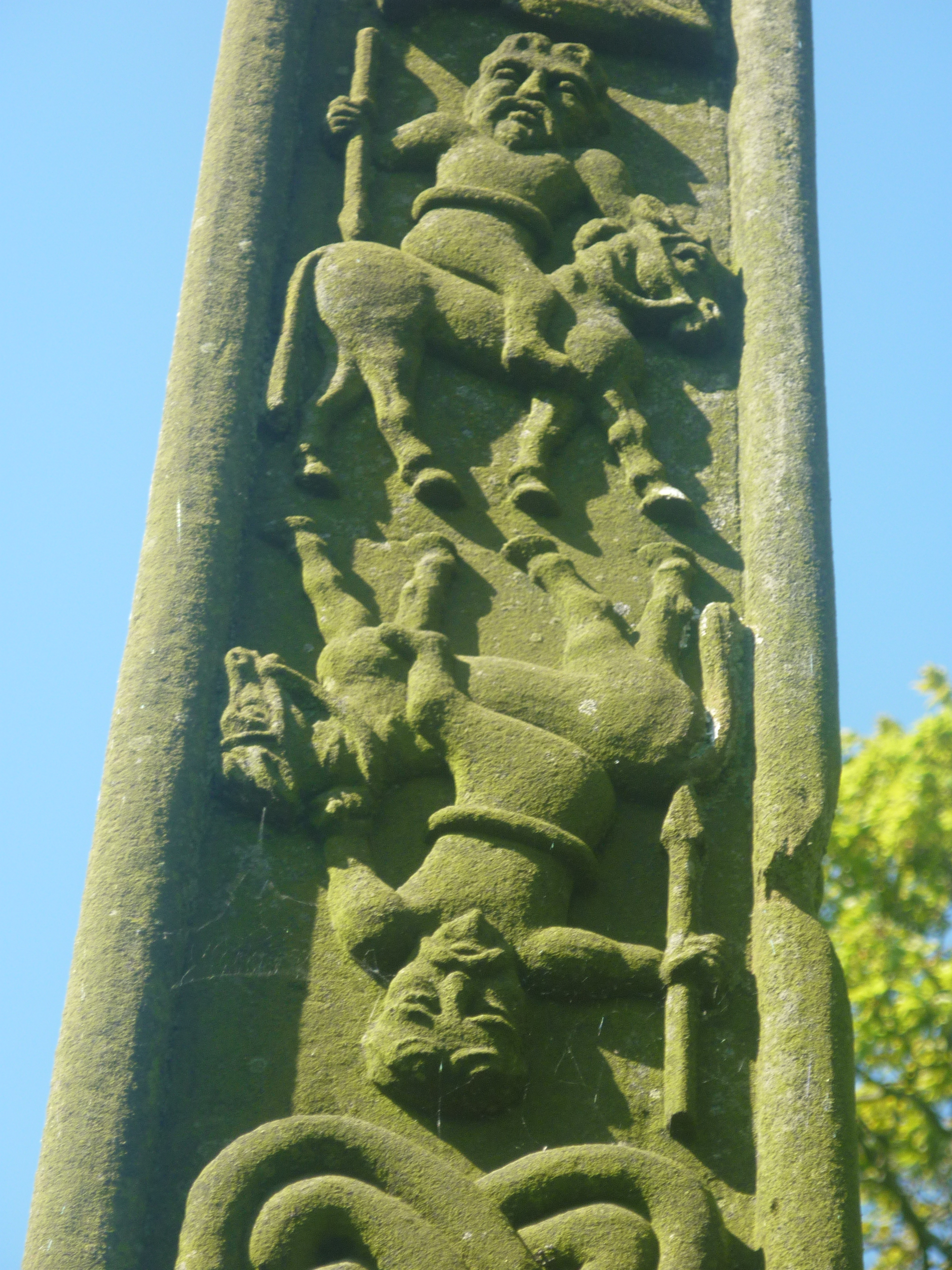
Some of the decorations on the Replica Gosforth Cross 2

== Academic contributions ==
- All references below, unless otherwise stated, were written for the Cumberland and Westmoreland Antiquarian and Archaeological Society and are printed in their Transactions.
- Notes on the Sculptured Stones at Dearham Church, Read at Dearham, 17 June 1880.
- Illustrations of Teutonic Mythology from early Christian Monuments at Brigham and Dearham. Read at Egremont, 30 August 1881.
- The Sculptured Cross at Gosforth, West Cumberland, by the Rev W. S. Calverley. Printed in the Transactions of the Cumberland & Westmorland Antiquarian and Archaeological Society 1883. doi:10.5284/1064497
- Early Sculptured Cross Shaft at Dearham Church, Cumberland. Read at Kirby Lonsdale 27 June 1883
- Barbon Cross. Read at Caldbeck. 22 August 1883.(Not printed in the Transactions)
- Some Ancient Dials in the Diocese of Carlisle. Read at Alston, 10 July 1884
- Sculptured Stone at Isel Church, Cumberland, bearing the 'Swastika', 'Triskele' and other symbols. Read at Carlisle, 23 July 1885.
- Cross fragments at St. Michael's Church, Workington. Read at Kirkby Stephen, 7 July 1887
- Notes on some coped pre-Norman Tombstones at Aspatria, Lowther, Cross-Canonby, and Plumbland. Read at Ulverston, 13 September 1887.
- Red sandstone Cross-Shaft at Cross-Canonby. Read at Ulverston, 13 September 1887.
- The Giant's Grave, Penrith. Read at Penrith, 12 July 1888. (Not printed in the Transactions)
- The Parish of Westward. Read at Westward, 13 September 1888.(Not printed in the Transactions)
- Fragments of a British Cross and many Early English and other grave-covers found in Bromfield churchyard. Read at Carlisle, 13 September 1888.
- Pre-Norman Cross fragments at Aspatria, Workington, Distington, Bridekirk, Gilcrux, Plumbland, and Isel. Read at Penrith 4 July and Ambleside, 6 September 1889.
- The Dacre Stone. Printed in the Transaction 1890.
- Fragments of Pre-Norman Crosses at Workington and Bromfield, and the Standing Cross at Rocliffe. Read at Appleby, 3 July 1890.
- Bewcastle Cross. Read at Bewcastle, 21 August 1891.
- Tympanum at Bridekirk Church. Read at Seascale, 21 September 1892.
- Crosses at Waberthwaite Church and at High Aketon Farm in the Parish of Bromfield. Read at Seascale, 21 September 1892.
- The Roman Fort at Hardknott. Printed in the Transaction for 1893 and 1895.
- Pre-Norman Cross Shaft at Haversham. Read at Haversham 25 September 1893.
- Shrine-shaped or Coped Tombstone at Gosforth, Cumberland. Read at Shap, 15 July and at Penrith 23 September 1897.
- He also wrote for the Archaeological Institute two papers on the sculptured Cross at Gosforth. A preliminary paper read at the meeting at Carlisle, 3 August 1882, and a second paper with full-sized drawings laid before the Institute at their meeting, 2 December 1882 and printed in the Archaeological Journal, vol. xl, p. 143.

== Bibliography ==
- Rev. William Slater Calverley; W. G. Collingwood M.A. (1899). Early Sculptured Crosses, Shrines and Monuments in the Present Diocese of Carlisle. Kendal: Titus Wilson.
- Prof. George Stephens (1884). Handbook of the Old-Northern Runic Monuments of Scandinavia and England. Edinburgh: Williams and Norgate.
- T. W. Norwood, ed. (1880–98). Transactions of the Cumberland and Westmorland Antiquarian and Archaeological Society. Kendal: Titus Wilson.
- Townend, Matthew (2009). The Vikings and Victorian Lakeland : the Norse medievalism of W.G.Collingwood and his contemporaries. CWAAS extra series, vol.34. Kendal: Cumberland & Westmorland Antiquarian and Archaeological Society. pp. xv, 328. ISBN 9781873124499.
