= St Kentigern's Church, Aspatria =

Coordinates: 54.7633°N 3.3281°W

St Kentigern's Church
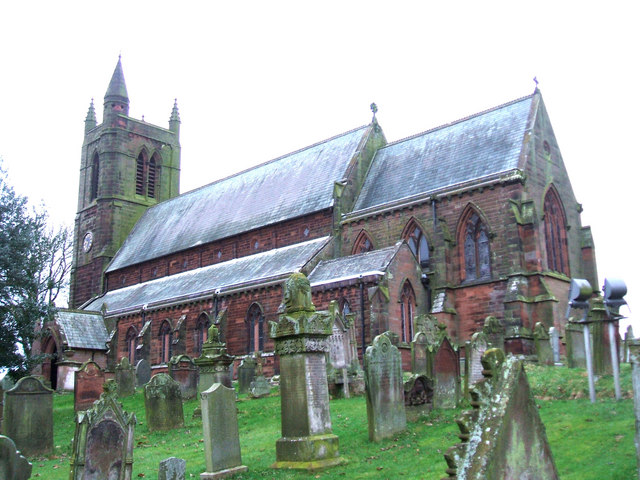
- St Kentigern's Church from the southeast

- Location in Allerdale Location in Cumbria
- OS grid reference: NY 325 398
- Location: Aspatria, Cumbria
- Country: England
- Denomination: Anglican
- Website: St Kentigern, Aspatria

History
- Status: Parish church
- Dedication: Saint Kentigern (Saint Mungo)

Architecture
- Functional status: Active
- Heritage designation: Grade II*
- Architectural type: Church
- Style: Norman, Gothic
- Groundbreaking: 19th century
- Completed: 1848

Specifications
- Materials: Body sandstone Tower sandstone with sandstone quoins, Roof green slate

Administration
- Province: York
- Diocese: Carlisle
- Archdeaconry: Carlisle
- Deanery: Maryport
- Parish: Aspatria

Clergy
- Vicar: Revd Tim Herbert

St Kentigern's Church stands in the village of Aspatria, Cumbria, England. It is an active Anglican parish church in the rural deanery of Maryport, the archdeaconry of Carlisle and the diocese of Carlisle. The church has been designated by English Heritage as a Grade II* listed building. It is dedicated to St Kentigern, the apostle of Strathclyde, whom it is believed passed by and preached at the Holy well, on his way into exile in Wales, in the 6th century. He was also known as Mungo, which means good friend.

== History ==
After the Norman Conquest the church was given by the first Lord of Allerdale to the prior and convent of Carlisle, which grant was confirmed by Henry II, and Edward III. It was formerly rectorial, but later became a vicarage, the advowson of which has always belonged to the Bishop of Carlisle, whom the great tithes were appropriated until the year 1812, when under the instruction of a local inclosure act, the Aspatria, Brumfield and Allhallows Inclosures Act 1812 (52 Geo. 3. c. cxxviii), allotments of land were given in lieu of tithes to the appropriator and vicar. Records relating to the old Norman church are sparse, although in 1703 Bishop William Nicolson left a full written description. When Sir Walter Scott visited Aspatria in the early part of the 19th century he included two engravings of the Norman arches in his Border Antiquities of 1814. The parish registers commenced in 1660.

The present Aspatria church dedicated to St Kentigern stands upon the site of an older Norman church, which when found too small for the rapidly increasing population of the parish was taken down and replaced by the existing edifice. This in turn had replaced at least one wooden structure of Saxon origin dating back to the 6th or 7th century and a pre Norman stone building of unknown origin. The foundation stone was laid on 23 July 1846, with full Masonic ceremonial; and consecrated by the Bishop of Carlisle on 6 June 1848. The total cost of the build was £3,180, half of which was raised by voluntary subscription.

== Architecture ==
=== Exterior ===
The church is in the early English style and finished in the manner of a Victorian town church. It consists of a nave, side aisles, chapel, chancel, south facing porch, vestry, and western tower, surmounted with parapets and pinnacles. The building is constructed from local red sandstone, with a roof made with Cumberland slate. The architects for the new church were Messrs. Travis and Mangnall, who preserved the chief architectural features of the old church and incorporated them into the design of the new building. The builders were Messrs. McKay and Blackstock. The designers reconstructed the Norman doorway which they used as the entrance to the vestry, placing another in the base of the tower. In the west end of the church, between the vestry and the tower they retained the old chancel arch, which is a fine example of what is called a dog-tooth type of decoration. They also retained and restored the Musgrave chapel. The tower is square and has a higher-stair turret at its north-east corner. The nave is lofty with six-bay arcades and small clerestory. The whole is beautifully proportioned with a high roof full of light.

=== Interior ===
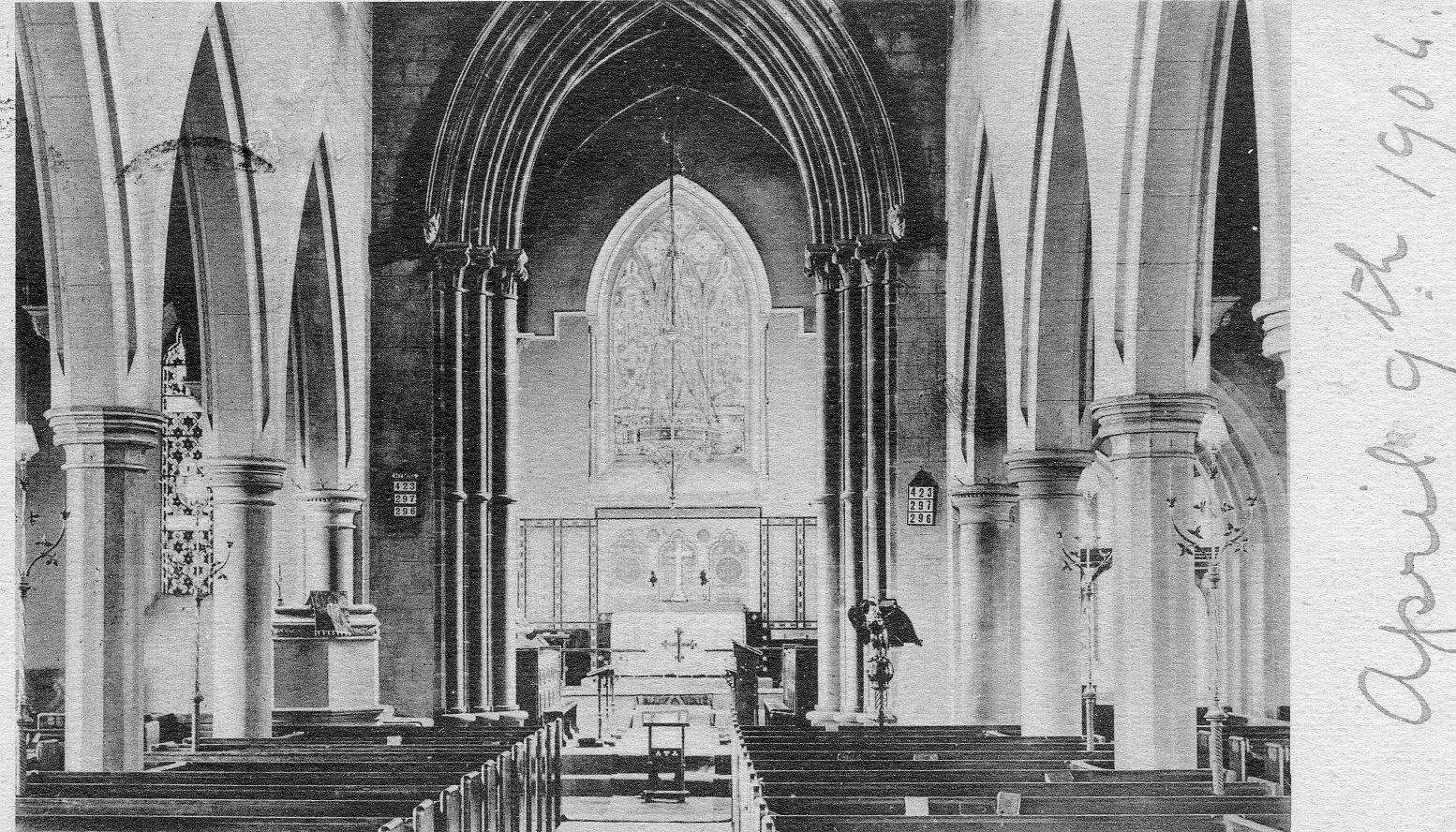
Interior view of St. kentigern's Parish Church Aspatria

The internal dimensions of the church are:- nave 22 metres by 12,2 metres; chancel 9.2 metres by 4.9 metres. Piers circular and multiangular alternatively. The pulpit made of stone, is on the north side of the chancel arch, and the reading desk is on the south side. The pews are open and uniform, with finials at the end. There are fine well executed stained glass windows, containing the Crucifixion, the Resurrection, and the Ascension with sacred devices and monograms. The window in the Musgrave Chapel contains the arms of the Musgrave family and others. It was given by Sir George Musgrave of Eden Hall, and Sir James Musgrave of Barnsley Park, Gloucester. There is also a window in the south side of the chancel, to the memory of the Rev. E. Thompson, vicar of the parish. In time additional items appeared. In 1875, a local resident named Sarah Langcake, dedicated a new organ at a cost of £200. A year Later, Mrs Powell, the widow of an earlier vicar, paid £120 for a clock to be placed in the tower, as a memorial to her late husband. She also paid for one of the bells, when the parishioners, the children, and Sir Wilfrid and Lady Lawson collaborated in 1898, to provide a peel of eight bells at a cost of £598. In 1899 a sum of £220 was paid for providing a heating system for the church. The terrier or inventory of church properties of 1749, which was signed by John Brisco, vicar, gives the following, one silver chalice with paten; and one silver cup with paten. There is also a modern set of Newcastle silver plate, consisting of a flagon, cup and paten, all dated 1840.

== The Musgrave chapel ==
Enclosed in the Musgrave chapel are several monuments relating to the Musgrave family, particularly Sir Richard Musgrave, 2nd Baronet (1650-1710), who accompanied Sir Joseph Williamson at the treaty of Ryswick, and was one of the knights of the shire. There is also a plaque to the memory of his grandson, Sir Richard Musgrave, Hylton 5th baronet (1724-1755). The plaque to the memory of Sir William Musgrave, 6th baronet (1735-1800) reads as follows.

"This monument was erected in memory of Sir William Musgrave, the sixth baronet of his family, and son of Sir Richard Musgrave, by Anne Hylton: the truest encomium of him will be found in the following synopsis of his well spent life. He was born at Hayton Castle in this parish, 8th October 1735: after the usual time spent in scholastic education, chiefly at Houghton-le-Spring, in the county of Durham: he was entered of the Middle Temple 7th April 1753, succeeded to the title of baronet on the death of his elder brother Sir Richard Musgrave, June 1755, was called to be a barrister of the law 5th May 1758, was married to Isabella, daughter of William Lord Byron, and relict of Henry Earl of Carlisle, 10th December 1759; was appointed one of the commissioners for managing the revenue of customs, 15th March 1763; was elected one of the fellows of the R. S. of London, 14th March 1775; was elected one of the fellows of the society of A. of London, 12th November 1778; was appointed one of the Vice Presidents of the Royal Society of London 1780; was elected one of the trustees of the British Museum, to which he was also a benefactor, 1783; was appointed one of the commissioners for auditing the public accounts, July 1785; was appointed one of the Vice Presidents of the Society of Arts 1786; was called to be a Bencher of the Middle Temple, 25th May 1789; was appointed reader of the Middle Temple 1795, and afterwards elected treasurer of the same. Having filled all the above mentioned employments with ability and integrity, he died without issue, 3d January 1800; aged 65, and is deposited in St. James's Church London."

There is also a monument to the memory of Sir Thomas Musgrave, 7th Baronet, who died in the month of December 1811. He left a sum of £10 per annum for the purpose of keeping the chapel in repair, and the monuments of himself and his ancestors clean; food was to be bought with any surplus and distributed amongst the poor of the parish.

There is also a monument to commemorate the life of Sir Richard Musgrave, 4th Baronet, (1701-1739), which is fixed to the outside of the church.

== Antiquities ==
=== The font ===
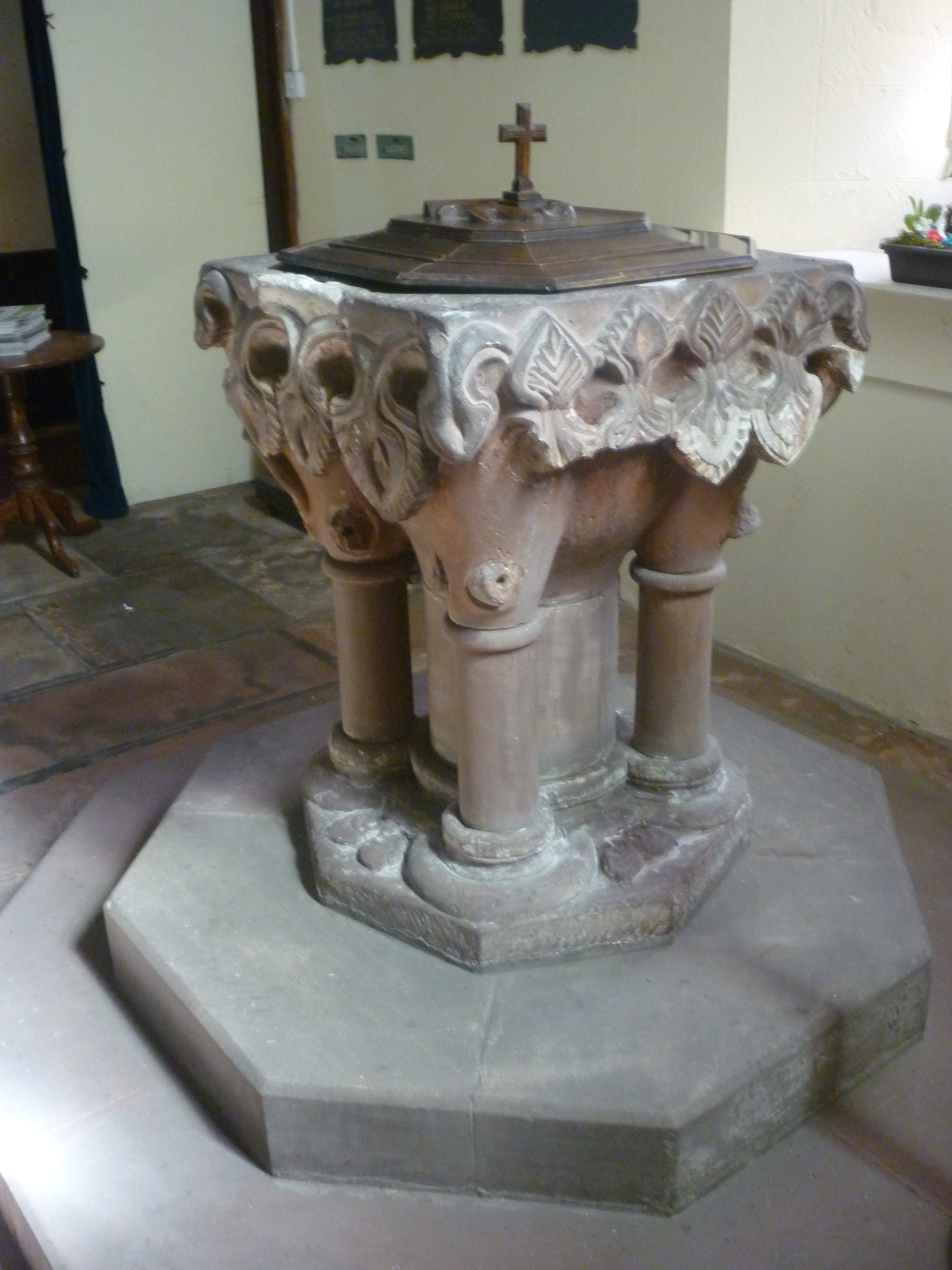
St. Kentigern's Church Aspatria, Font

The date of the Font is unknown. However at the time of the Reformation it was grossly defaced and discarded, surplus to requirements. The wreckers had made large holes in each side and greatly defaced the ornamentation. When restored at a later date the craftsmen filled in the holes with plaster, reproduced the defaced ornamentation and added new pillars. They then applied a yellow pigment to hide the defects and covered the upper surface of the bowl with lead. The Font now stands on an octagonal base. In 1903, it was moved from a position under the west arch and now stands in the Baptistery. It is almost one metre in height and about sixty centimetres in diameter. On the west side are four double leafed ornaments; on the north and south sides there are three larger single leaf ornaments, and on the east is a winged demon with head bent down, closed wings and a curled and forked tail, each part of which ends in a serpent-like head, surrounded with fruit and leaves, and with a leaf in its mouth. The design is supposed to inculcate the idea that the evil spirit is expelled during the baptism of the child.

=== Pre Norman crosses ===
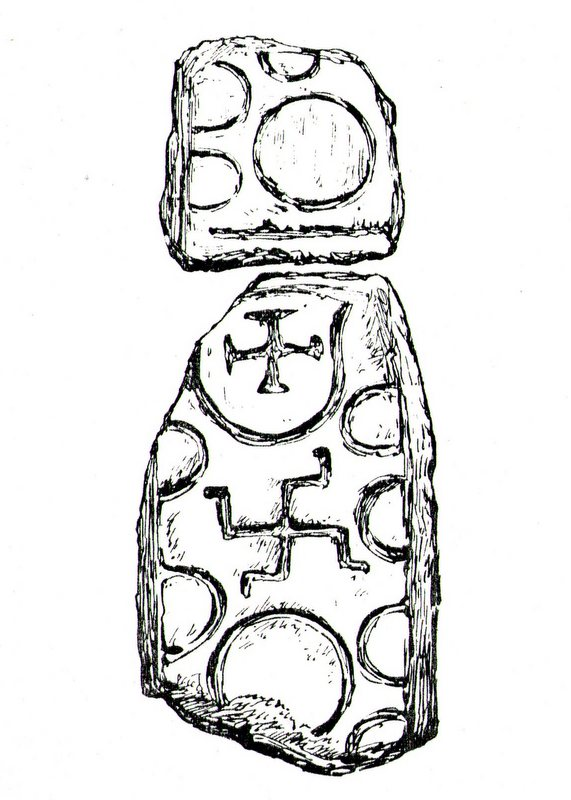
St. Kentigern's Church Aspatria, Swastika Fragment

Several ancient crosses and grave slabs have been carefully preserved in the church, the description of which is largely from the research carried out by the Rev. William Slater Calverley, vicar from 1885 to 1888. Some of these remains are built into the boundary wall of the churchyard while others are in the vestry. One of the fragments contains the swastika, the emblem of eternity. It is considered to have been carved in the middle part of the fifth century.

=== The spiral crosses ===
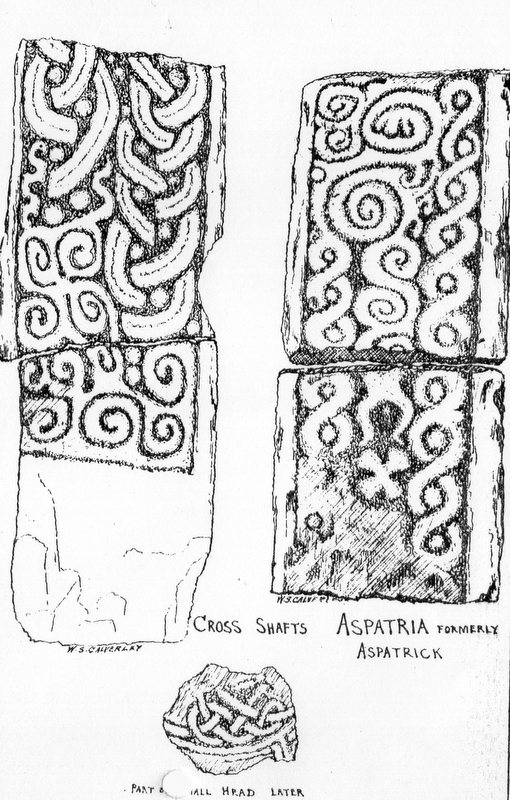
St. Kentigern's Church Aspatria Spiral Cross

There are two shafts belonging to two spiral crosses, both are carved from white sandstone and each in two parts. One is 1.15 metres high and 40 centimetres wide. The top piece has plait-work in sham double strands; with bosses in every available place. The bottom piece holds a carved swastika. The two parts of the other slab are together 92 centimetres high and 38 centimetres wide and 15 centimetres thick. There is evidently a portion missing between the two. Two broad lateral bands passing round bosses, haze a central scroll at the top, whilst in the lower part are the body and legs of a man, with the swastika below. This has been taken as representing the crucifixion of Jesus. In all there are nine slabs in the vestry.

=== The standing cross ===
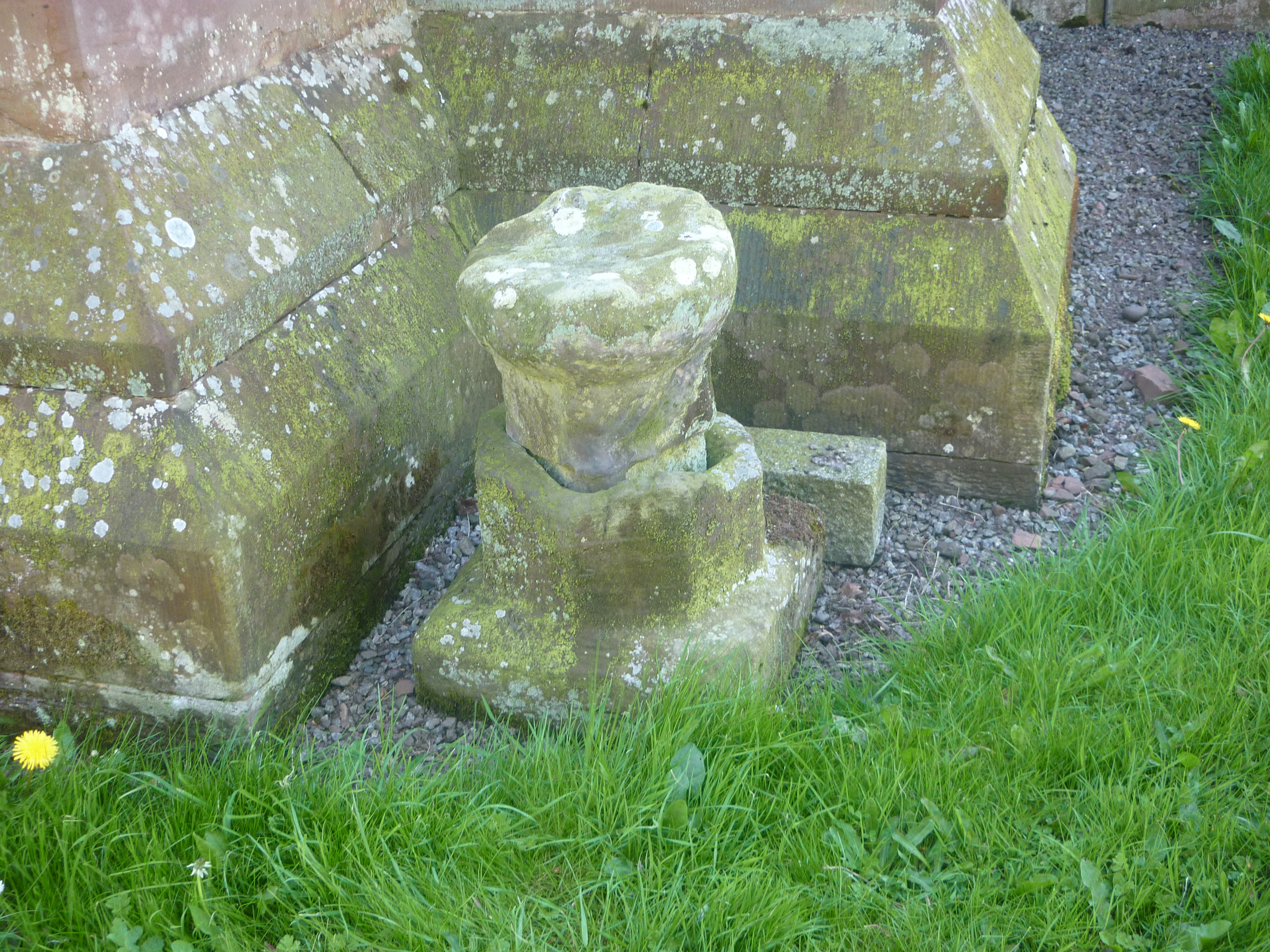
St. Kentigern's Church Aspatria, Standing Cross Socket

The standing cross is pre Norman and is made of red sandstone. It is 1.37 metres high, 37 centimetres wide at the top and 46 centimetres wide at the bottom with a thickness of 20 centimetres. The wheelhead has been broken off, but its lower part is still visible. The west face has a kind of knot work covering the whole surface. Two other surfaces have similar carvings, however at the foot of one of these sides is a bound animal, with its head turned over its back. This may signify that man's enemies cannot arm them in the presence of the cross. The remaining face is carved with broad rings and crossing bands. Originally the standing cross stood in the churchyard in its own socket, which is 76 centimetres by 66 centimetres. To strengthen it Calverley poured lead into the joint. It was later moved into the vestry where it sits beside the Font.

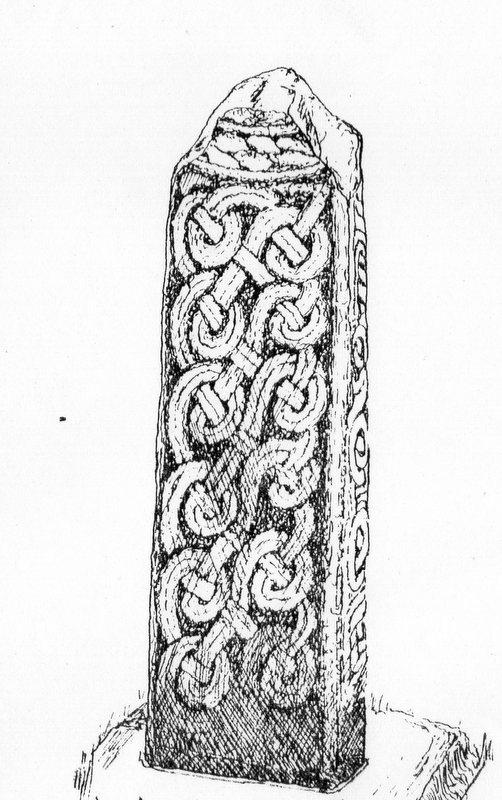
St. Kentigern's Church Aspatria, Standing Cross

=== Grave slabs ===
In the east wall of the churchyard is a slab 1.45 metres long and 38 centimetres broad at one end and 30 centimetres at the other. It contains an incised floriated cross head, with a trefoil cut on each side of the stem just below the crosshead. On the right side is a book of the gospels 15 centimetres long. The cross stands on Calvary steps. On the same wall is a second slab 34 centimetres long 20 centimetres wide at the top and 13 centimetres at the bottom. The cross is also on Calvary steps and the slab has chamfered edges.

=== Hogbacks ===
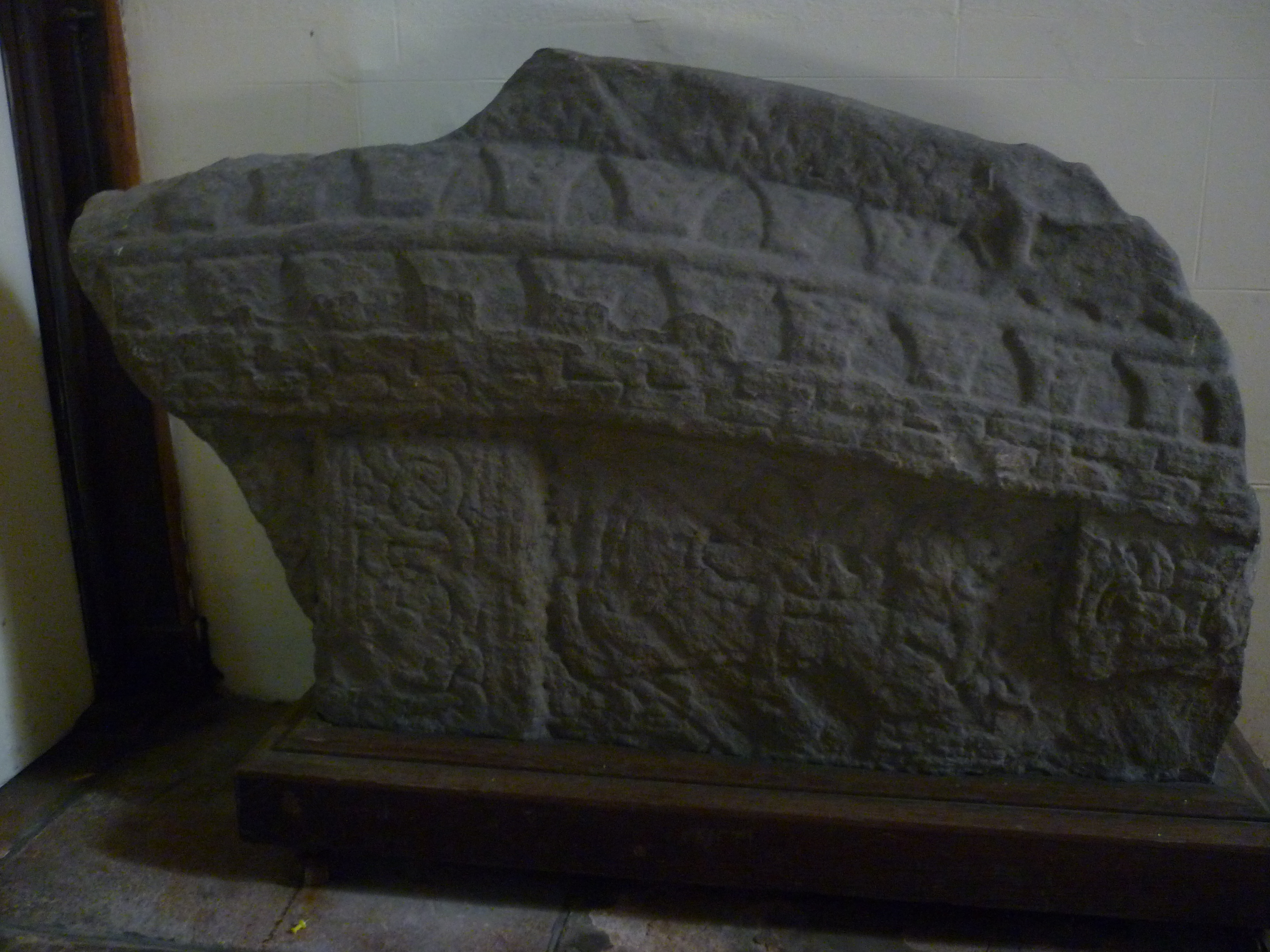
St Kentigern's Church Aspatria, Hogback

A Hogback is a recumbent coped shrine tombstone, shaped to represent the house of the dead, with a roof carved to look like tiles, and walls carved to represent ideas symbolic with death and resurrection. When the builders dismantled the old Norman church they found a Hogback in the building material. It is 1.17 metres long and 69 centimetres high. At the top is a highly decorated ridge, 7.6 centimetres thick, with two zigzag flat bands worked upon it. It stands 7.6 centimetres above the roof below. It has a curved surface, and is ornamented on one side with recessed work like two moulded tiles and on the other with one row. These are adorned with a simple Triquetra, the sign of the Trinity on each tile. Along the eaves is a broad band worked with a kind of key pattern. The upright sides of the house are covered with interlacing flat bands on one side, and the walls are strengthened with pilasters highly ornamented. A broad one in the middle and a narrower one at each end (one end having been broken away). The other side is much damaged, but shows evidence of knot work of double strands. The Hogback is now in the vestry, close to the Font.

== External features ==
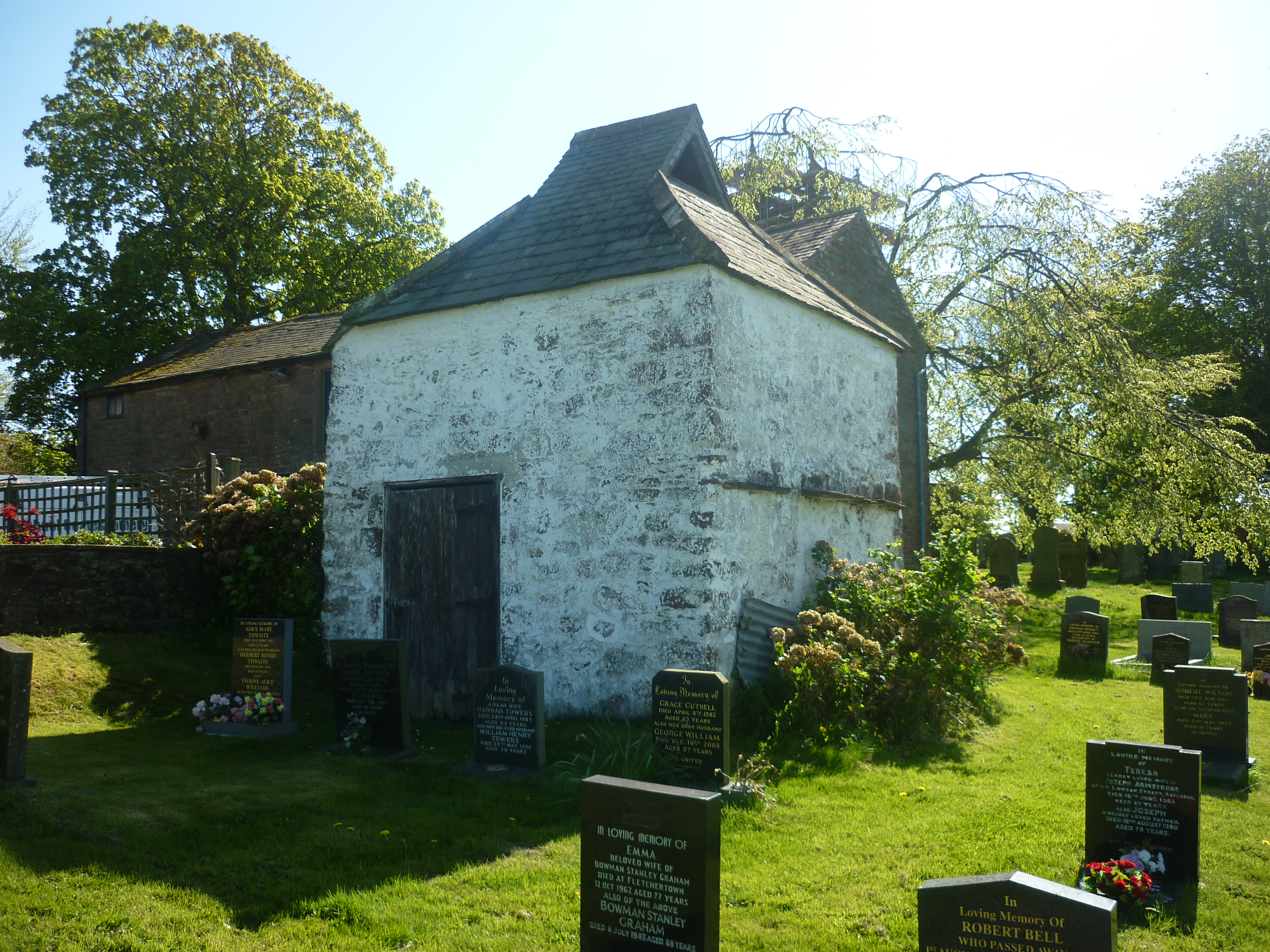
St Kentigern's Church Aspatria, Dovecote

The church and the extensive churchyard are enclosed by a boundary wall. On the south side are the main oak gates, which in 1933, were carved by Mr Joseph Berwick and his daughter Alice (later Cane). These are now Grade II listed under the Planning (Listed Buildings and Conservation Areas) Act 1990 as amended for its special architectural or historic interest. On the north side, beyond the wall of the old vicarage garden stands the ancient Dovecote, again Grade II listed. The Dovecote is arguably the oldest building in the neighbourhood. On the east side of the church is the mock Gosforth Cross, carved under the instruction of the Rev. William Slater Calverley. Towards the northern end of the boundary is St. Kentigern's Well which is still supplied with a head of water. Granted that St. Kentigern and other missionaries preached here, it is probable that this was the place where his converts were baptised. It is said that there is a well at each of the churches dedicated to St. Kentigern. The earliest vicarage, a low whitewashed building, with small windows and flagged floor was built in 1714. It was however, totally inadequate as a home for the vicar and as a consequence several lived elsewhere. It was demolished in 1868 and replaced with the present building. In the 1990s the church built a new vicarage in the garden, with an entrance off King Street. The old vicarage is now a home for two families.

== List of vicars ==
Vicars of St Kentigern's Church, Aspatria (As recorded on a tablet in the nave of the church)

- 1174 Benedict
- 1200 Adam
- 1292 Bartholomew de Kertling
- 1309 Alan de Horncastle
- 1318 Richard de Melburn
- 1333 Nicholas de Stoveton
- 1333 Robert Bully
- 1357 Adam Deincourt
- 1357 Roger de Ledes
- 1358 Adan de Alneburgh
- 1380 William de Arthuret
- 1385 Robert de Pontefract
- 1385 Adam de Fonward
- 1397 John Mayson
- 1405 Thomas de Brampton
- 1424 William Sandes
- 1462 John Yodal
- 1474 William More
- 1489 Thomas Yong
- 1490 John de Ireby
- 1565 Edward Mitchell
- 1565 Anthony Thwaites
- 1578 Lancelot Dawson
- 1610 William Orbell
- 1617 Mathew Braddel
- 1639 Thomas Warwick
- 1661 Francis Palmer
- 1686 Richard Holme
- 1695 George Fleming
- 1703 Robert Hume
- 1706 David Bell
- 1729 John Brisco
- 1771 William Gilpin
- 1793 William Fernyhough
- 1815 John C. Gilbanks
- 1837 Edward Thompson
- 1838 Edward Salkeld
- 1872 L. T. Shipman
- 1879 T. W. Powell
- 1885 W. S. Calverley
- 1898 F. L. H. Millard
- 1905 Thomas Hackworth
- 1921 J. L. Crawley
- 1928 A. H. Hodgson
- 1939 Henry Whitley
- 1954 Vernon D, Clark
- 1963 John Needham
- 1972 G G Douglas
- Brian Rowe
- Clive Shaw
- Tim Herbert

== See also ==
- Grade II* listed buildings in Cumbria
- Listed buildings in Aspatria
