= Gosforth Cross =

Cross in Gosforth, Cumbria, UK

Coordinates: 54.41934°N 3.43165°W

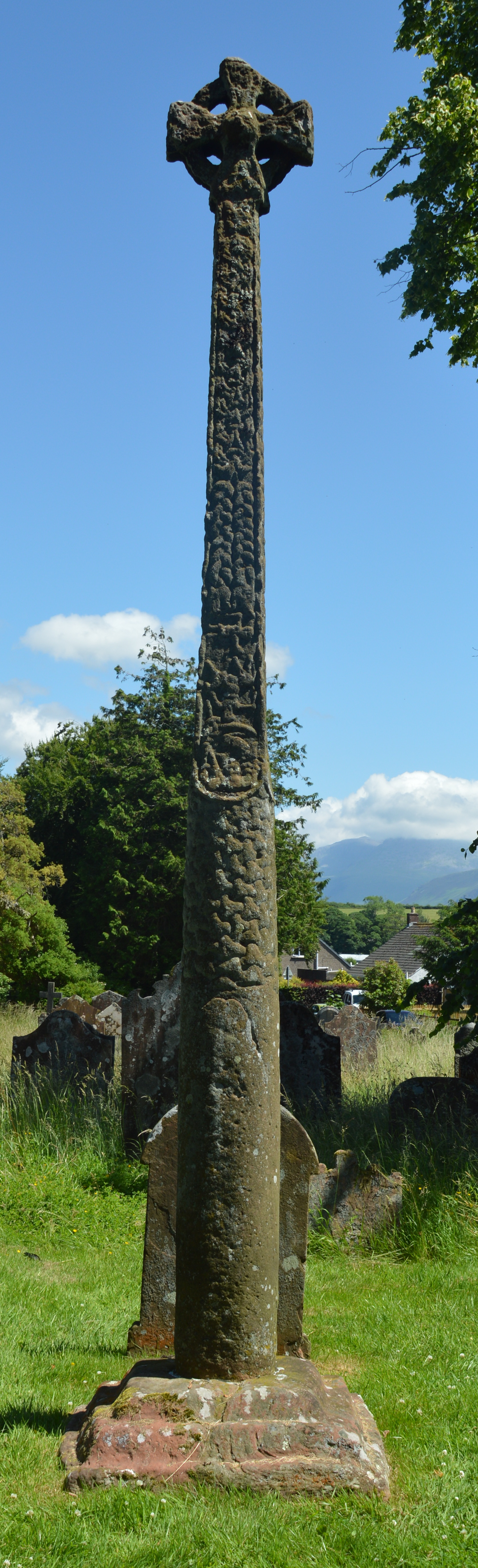
Gosforth High Cross, Cumbria UK.

The Gosforth Cross is a tall, slender Viking High Cross, dating to the first half of the 10th century AD in St Mary's churchyard, Gosforth in the English county of Cumbria. It is a remarkable and unique example of early medieval sculpture in the British Isles.

The coastal strip of Cumbria was historically part of the kingdom of Northumbria, but was settled by Scandinavians in either the 9th or 10th century. The cross is highly significant in showing a transition from Pagan to Christian beliefs in this area as it carries both Christian and Nordic symbols. The dual symbolism of the Cross was first identified following a suggestion in 1881 by local amateur antiquarian Dr Charles Arundel Parker. Subsequent investigations with Rev. William Slater Calverley, and Professor Dr George Stephens of Copenhagen University demonstrated that the cross showed scenes described in the old Norse narrative poems; the Poetic Edda. Since then the Cross has been a source of great interest because of its insight into a dim and poorly documented period in European history.

== Modern identification of carvings ==
The modern identification of the carvings started at a meeting on 30th August 1881 of the Cumberland and Westmorland Antiquarian and Archaeological Society (CWAAS) at Gosforth to view the cross. Dr C A Parker, an amateur antiquarian living in the parish, drew attention to the local tradition that the cross had been erected by Danes who had been converted to Christianity. Supporting this, the Revd W S Calverley thought that the west face showed the binding of the god Loki, the Scandinavian Evil One, to a rock. But, with the poor definition of a lichen-covered surface viewed from below there was divided opinion amongst the antiquarians present. Shortly afterwards in the late autumn of 1881, when wet weather had softened the lichen on the Cross, Calverley and Parker supervised Parker’s coachman in clearing the lichen with a wet brush, and saw the clear emergence of symbolic carvings which Calverley related to stories in the Norse Poetic Edda. The cross was later carefully cleaned, professionally photographed and stone rubbings made. This enabled Parker to produce a drawing of the four faces.

The photographs and rubbings were sent to Professor George Stephens of Copenhagen University, a runic and Scandinavian folklore expert and member of the CWAAS, with whom Calverley had previously worked on other Cumbrian stones, and an intense correspondence ensued. Stephens was so amazed that in 1882 he attended Calverly's initial lecture at Carlisle and travelled to Gosforth to see the cross for himself. He pronounced it to be “one of the costliest olden Roods in Europe” and probably of 7th Century date. In 1882 papers were read before the Royal Archaeological Institute meetings at Carlisle and Oxford by Calverley where he first formally communicated his reading of the figurative panels and related them to episodes described in Norse mythology and Christian belief. This caused something of a sensation as there had been a strongly-held belief that a Christian monument could only have Christian symbols. That was now shown to be wrong, and over the next few years other examples came to light elsewhere in England to corroborate this.. In 1883 a seminal paper was written for the CWAAS Transactions by Calverley, with drawings, measurements and details by Parker, and engravings by Professor Magnus Petersen of Copenhagen. This paper has been the bedrock of all interpretive discussions since.

The newly-realised importance of the Gosforth Cross prompted the Victoria and Albert Museum to have a cast replica made in 1882 (as well as one of the older Irton Cross) ; both are on display in the Cast Hall at the Museum. In 1887, Calverley commissioned and personally helped to carve a life-sized replica in order to understand the design and carving process, and erected it in the churchyard at St Kentigern's Church, Aspatria, Cumbria. Many papers have since been read for the CWAAS and other organisations and several booklets have been produced by Parker, Calverley and others. As late as 1917 Parker wrote a joint paper with W G Collingwood “A reconsideration of Gosforth Cross” for the CWAAS which examined the cross in the light of stylistic and historical information that had been gathered from other sources since the first modern identification.

== Description ==
The cross is 4.4 metres (14 ft) tall and carved out of red sandstone. It is now estimated to date from 920 to 950 and is still in remarkably good condition. Its design shows a strong Anglo-Saxon influence. The Cross has elaborate carvings which have been interpreted as representing characters and scenes from Norse mythology, similarly to how the Jelling stones in Denmark depict Jesus with other Norse mythological characters. Its shape is modelled after cross designs that originated during the Christianization of Ireland.

Norse mythological images include:

- The god Víðarr tearing the jaws of Fenrir.
- The god Loki bound with his wife the goddess Sigyn protecting him.
- The god Heimdall holding his horn.

The Christian Image is the Baldr-Odin or Crucifixion panel, a depiction of the crucifixion of Jesus. These are shown in the following engravings of the cross. The images were engraved by Julius Magnus Petersen and first published to accompany Calverley's 1883 CWAAS paper.

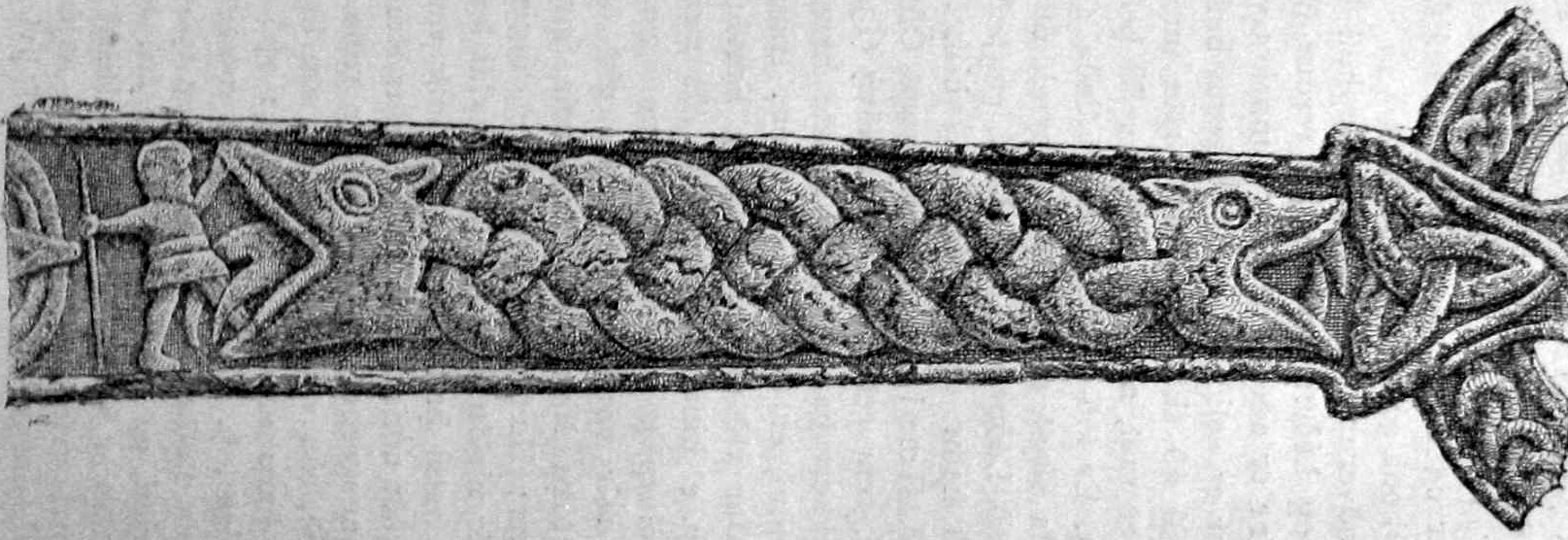
Víðarr's battle with Fenrir at Ragnarök.

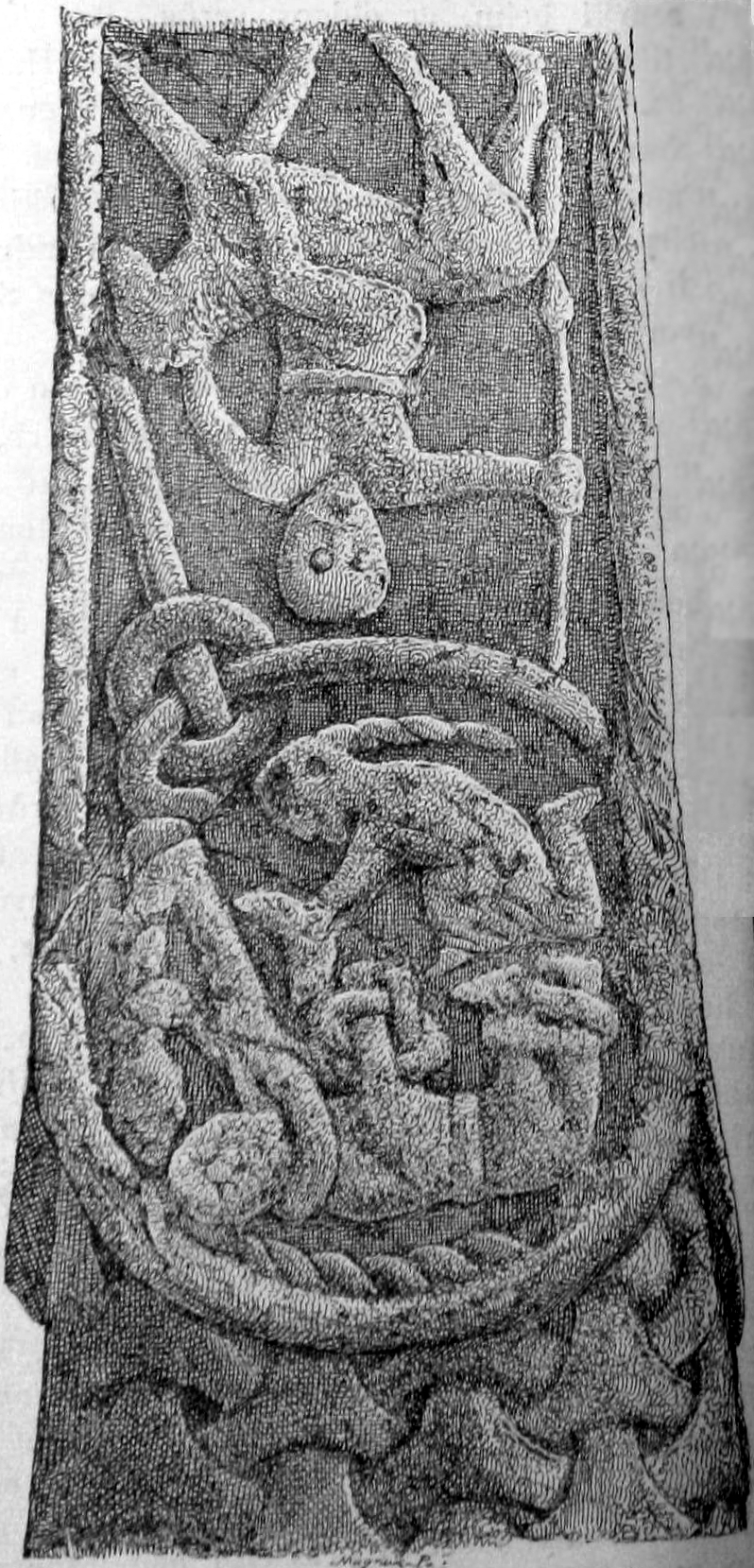
The bound Loki

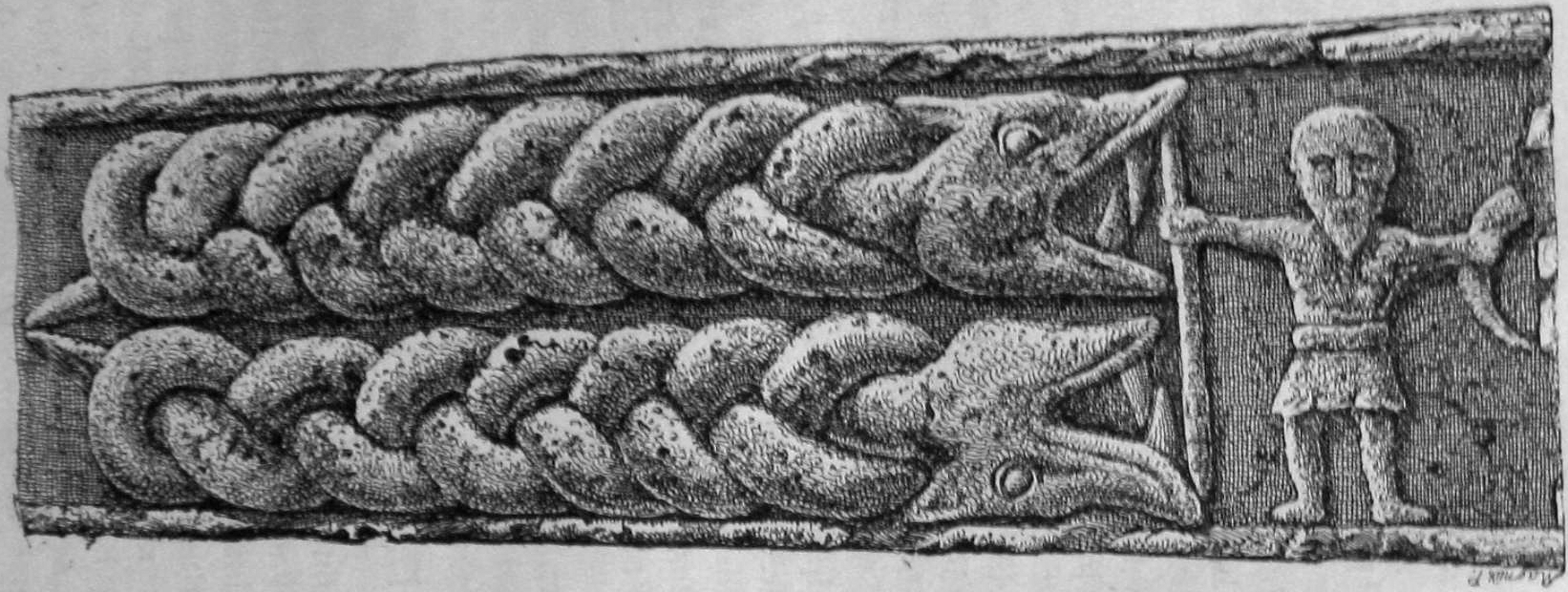
The god Heimdall holding his horn.

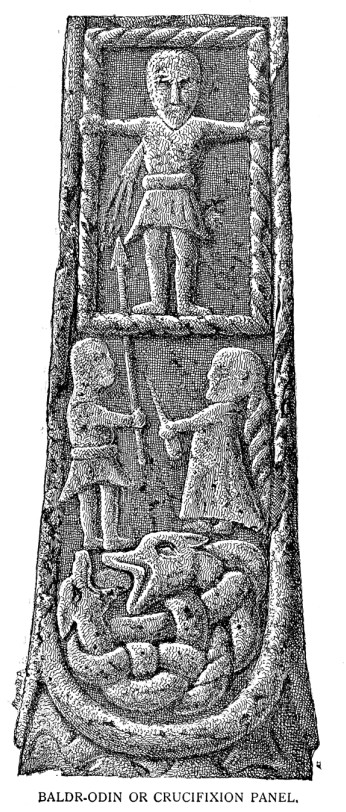
The Baldr-Odin or Crucifixion panel.

There is debate whether these images were included out of reverence for traditional Viking beliefs or as a way to parallel Norse mythology (i.e. Ragnarök, the death of Baldr) with Christian beliefs (i.e. the Apocalypse, the crucifixion of Christ). Among the parallels is the bound Loki being allegorical for Satan being bound, and the death of Baldr accompanied by Hod and Nanna being interchangeable with Christ's death as witnessed by Longinus and Mary Magdalene. Also the battle Odin has with Surtr similar to how Christ ultimately conquers the Devil. It has also been suggested that the combination of Christian and Norse pagan symbolism on the cross may be evidence of the use of pagan stories to illustrate Christian teachings. Christ here is depicted as a deity of power, hence why he is absent on the cross head. He was popularly interpreted as a deity of power amongst Viking culture.

Another discussion is why the base of the cross has a tree-like design, looking like bark. Is this is a possible parallel between Yggsdrasil and the Tree of Life; both featured heavily in their respective mythologies.

These ongoing debates do not necessarily agree with all of the parallels that Calverley drew in his 1883 paper, but those are recognised by modern scholars as making it necessary to consider early mediaeval sculpture in the light of Old Norse literature

== Cross Gallery ==
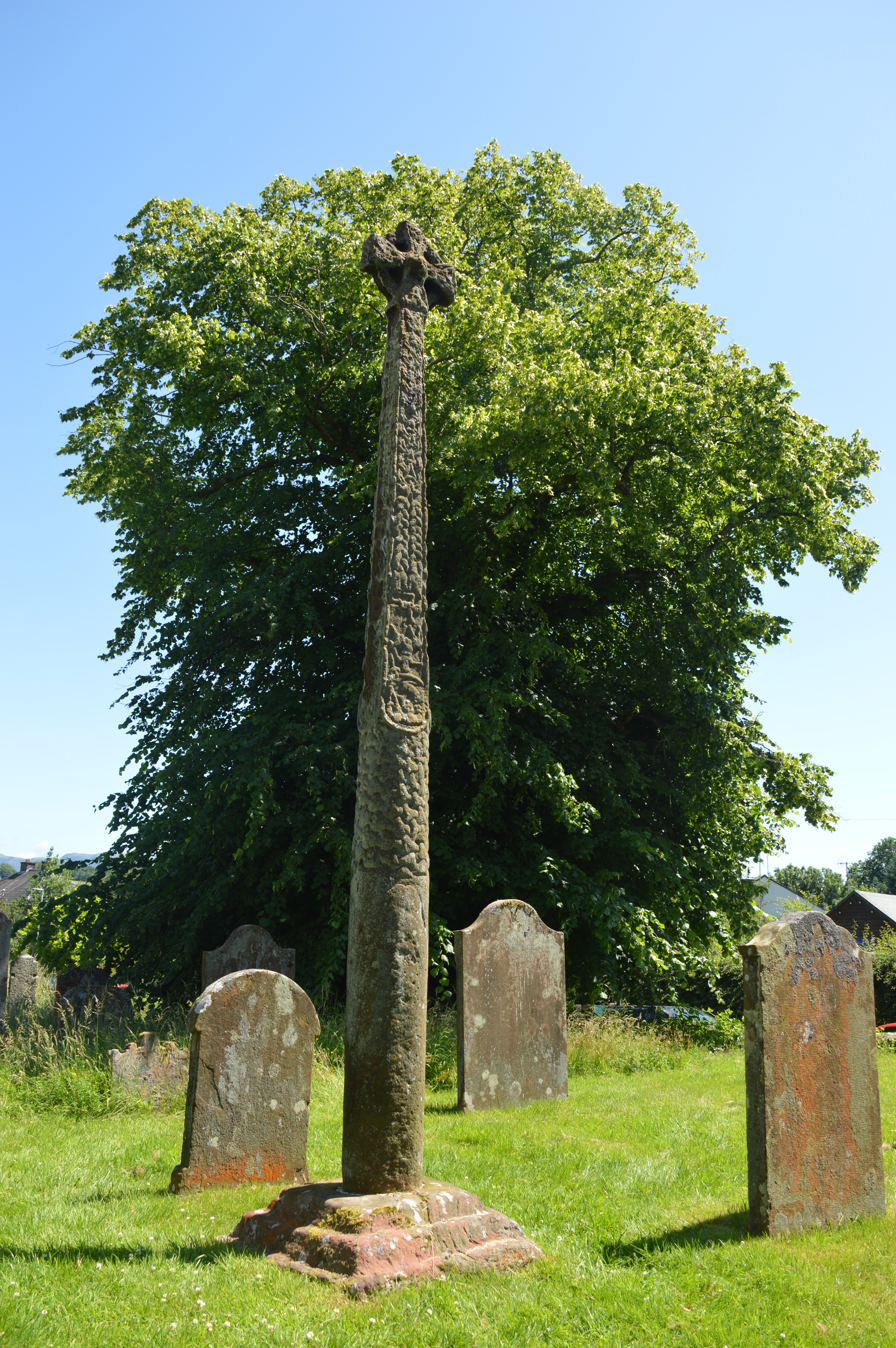
The cross from the NW

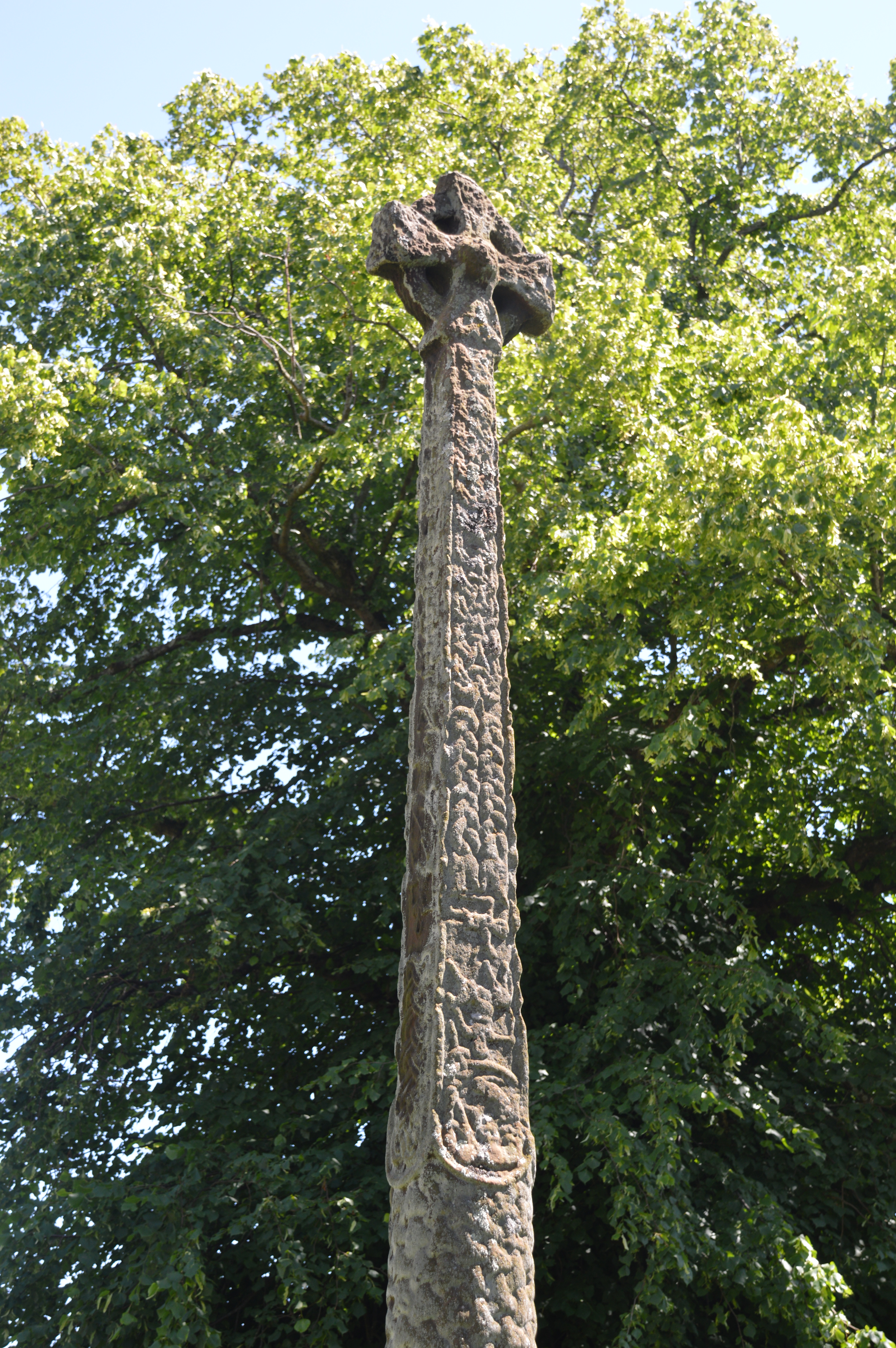
Figurative section West Face - Loki panel

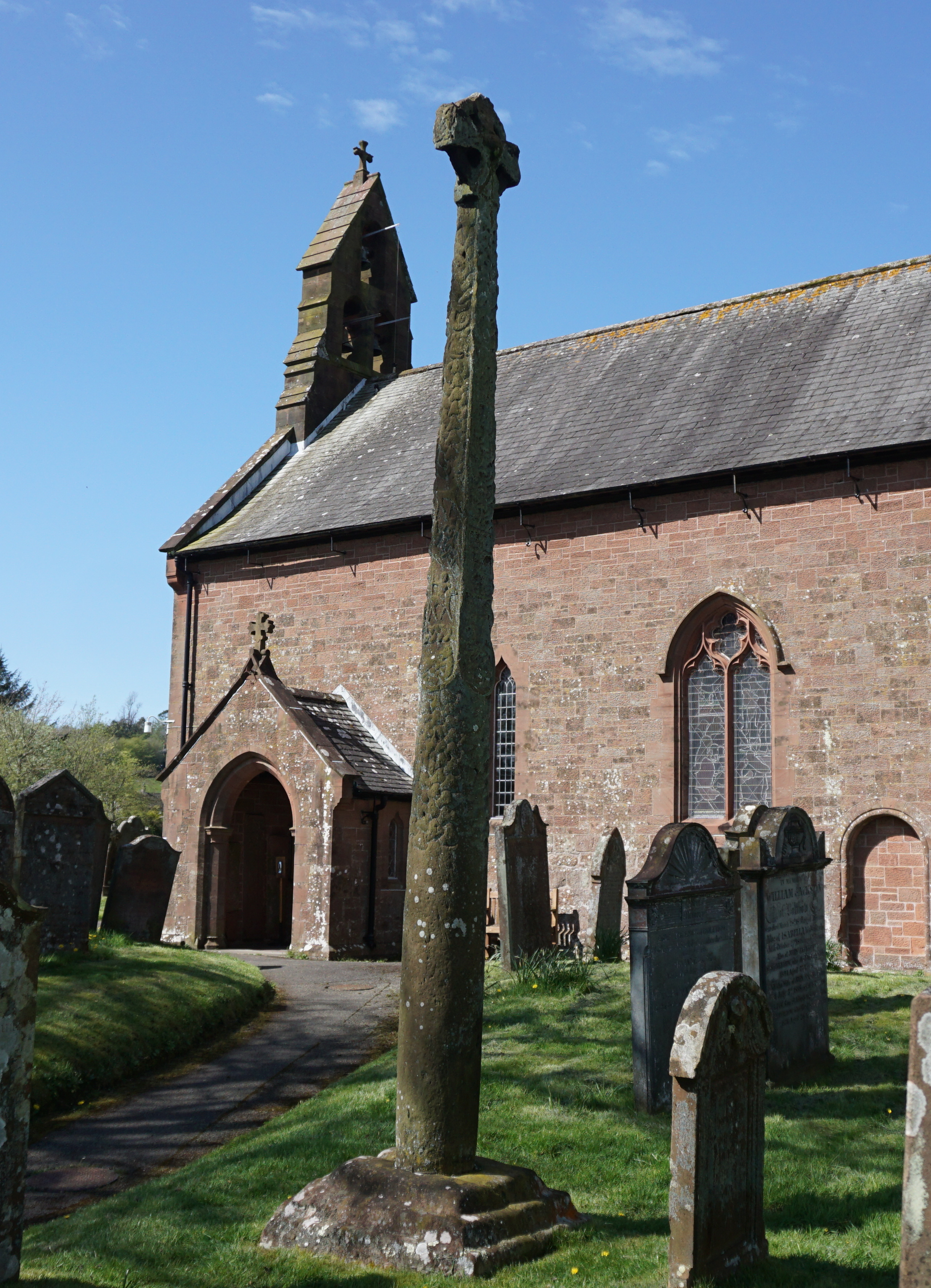
Cross and church, from the SE

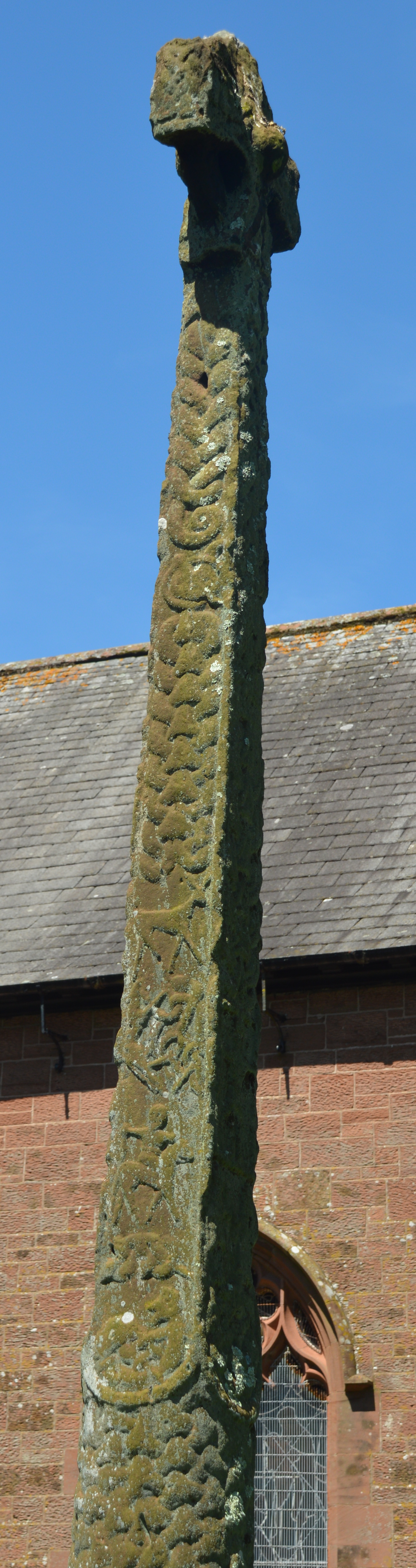
Cross South face detail

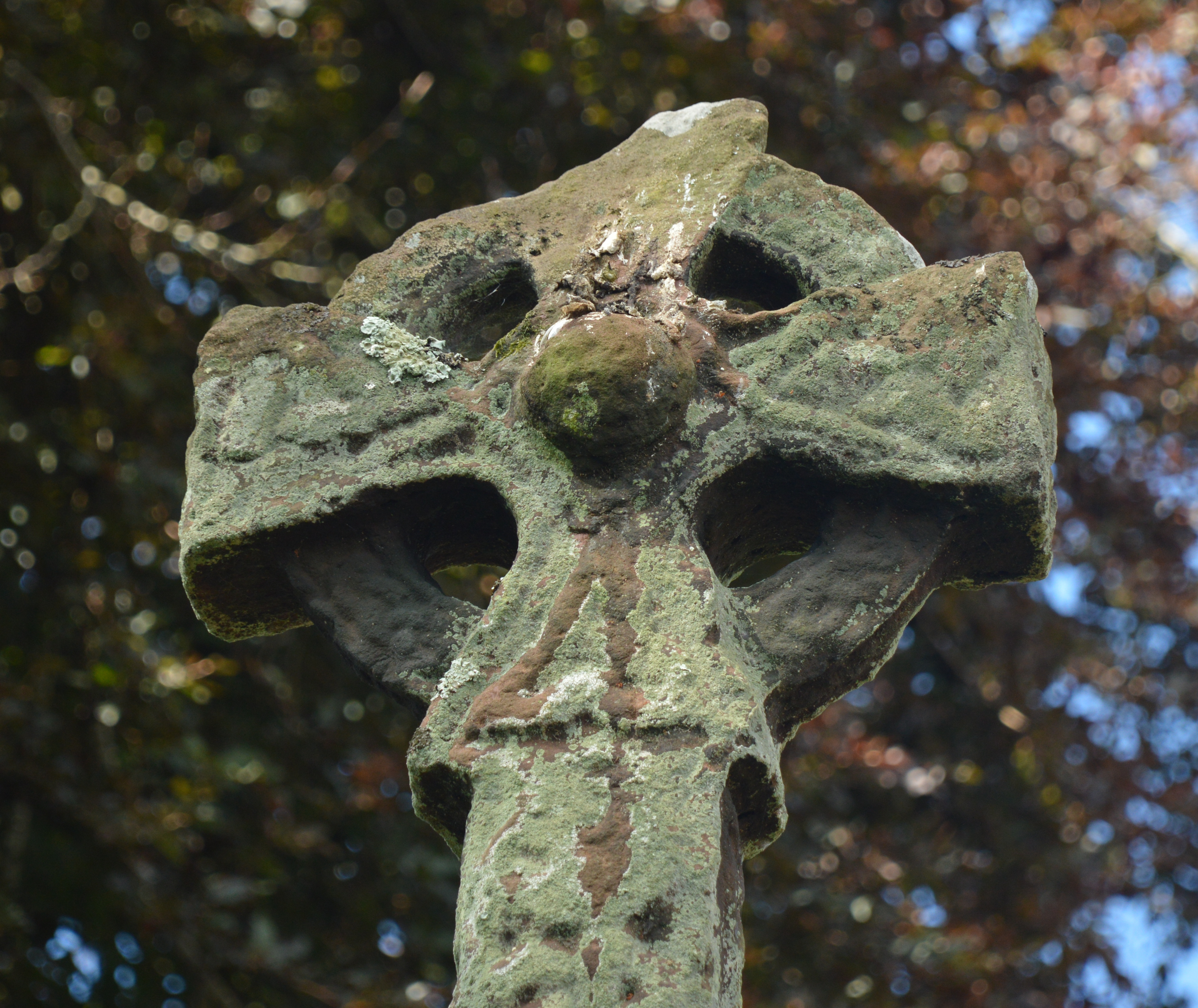
Crosshead East face.

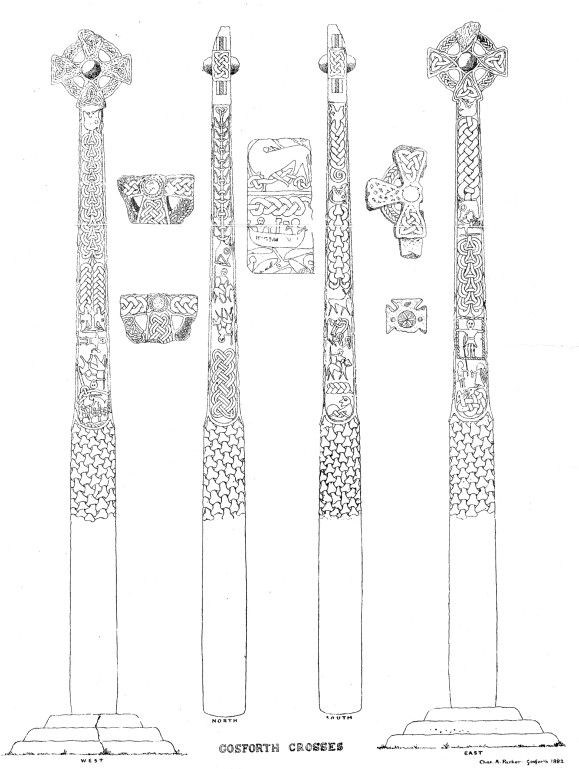
1882 drawing of the Cross and related fragments by C A Parker

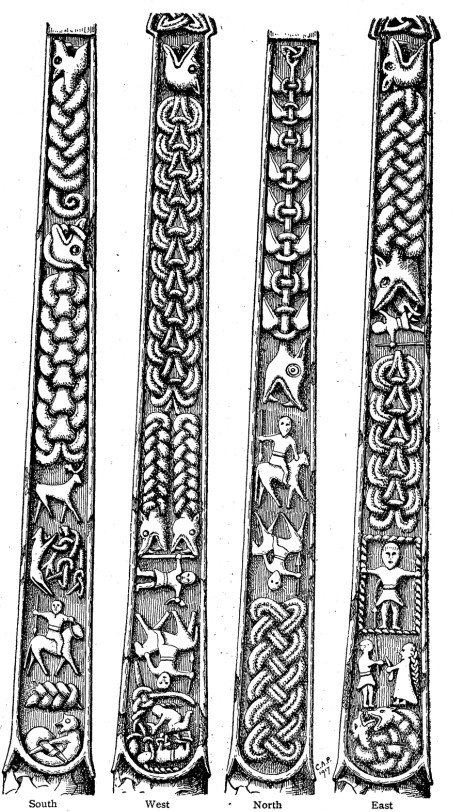
1917 drawing of the figured part of the Cross by C A Parker

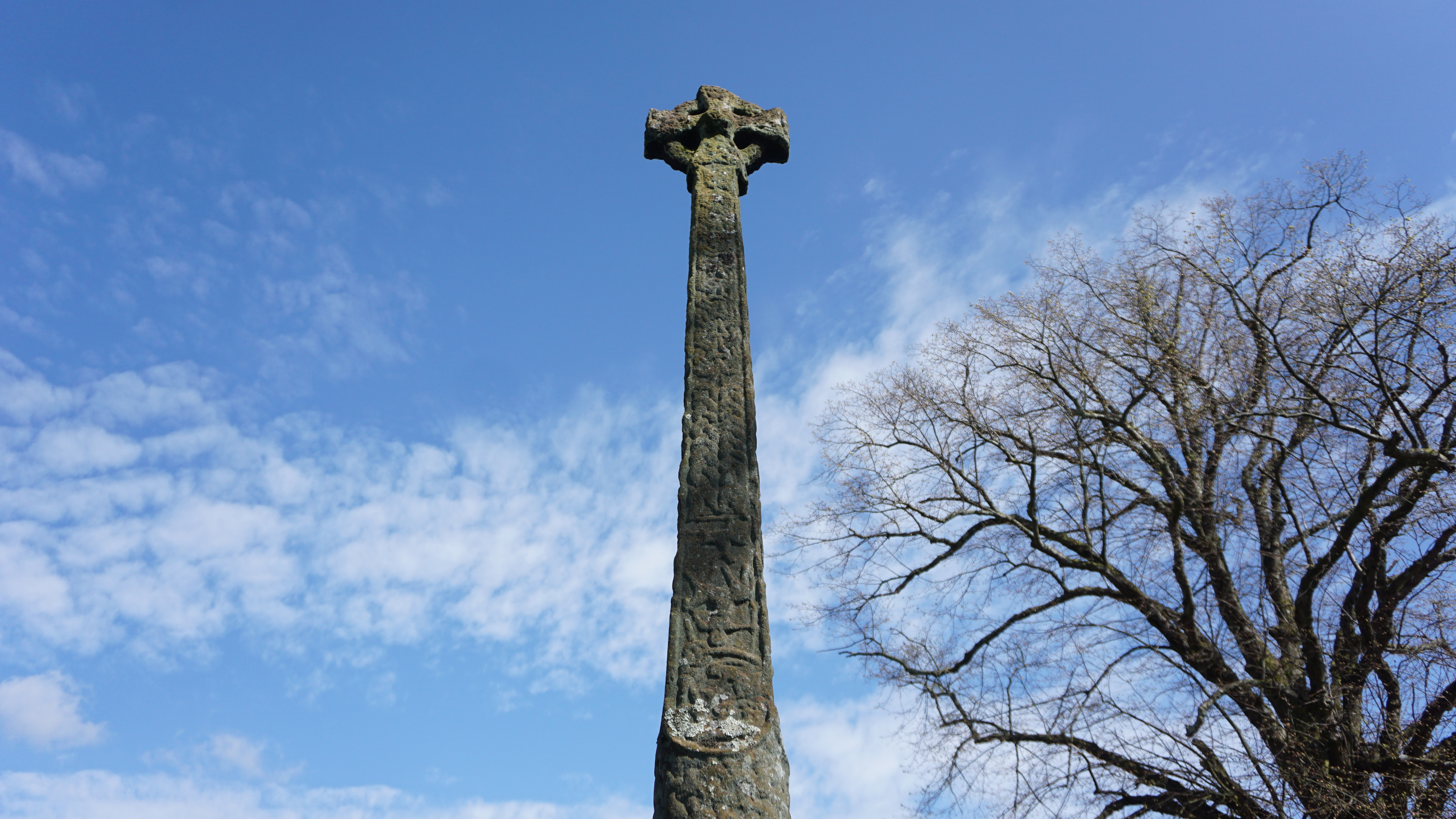
The western face of the cross, as seen from below.

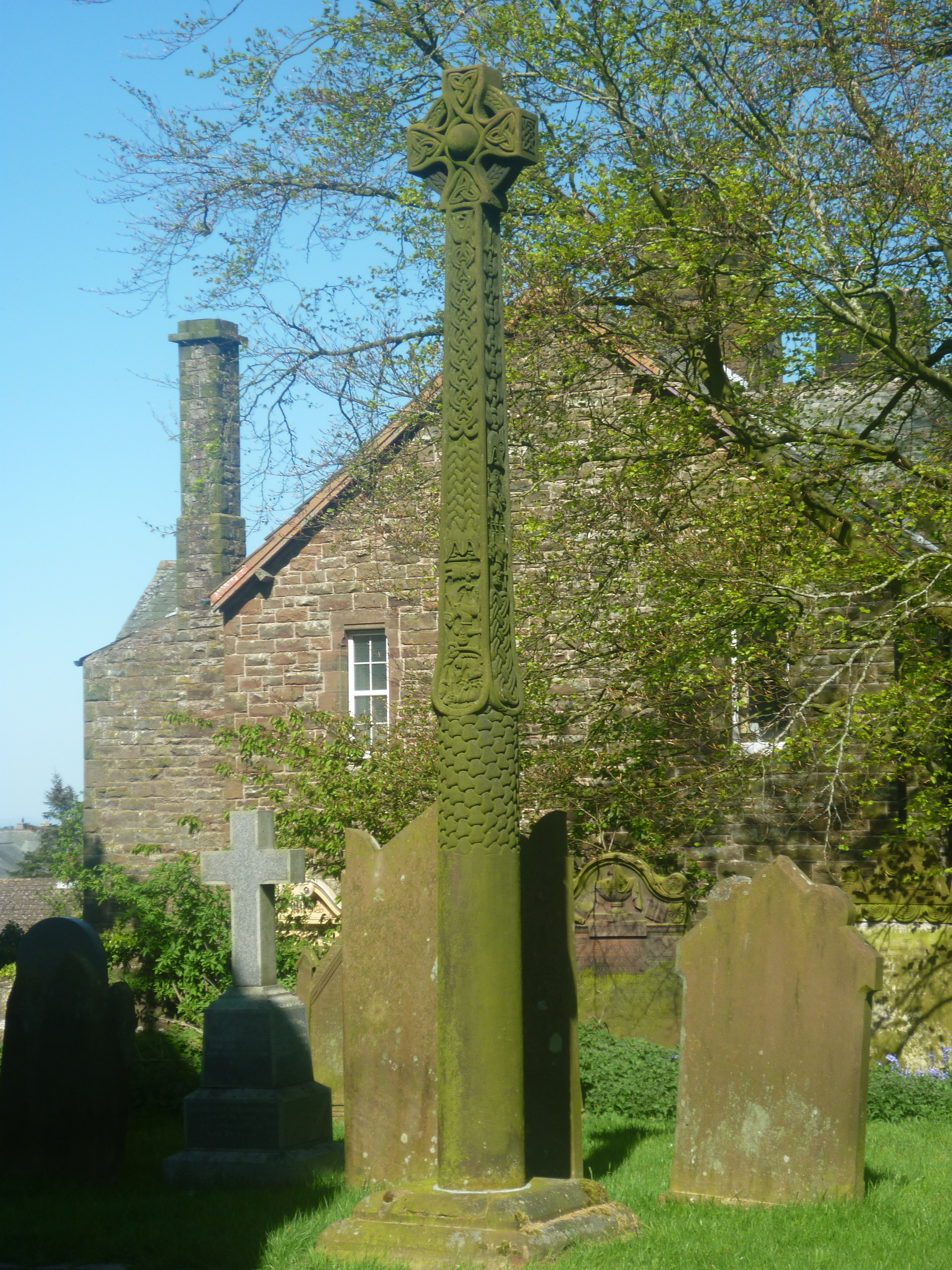
Replica life-sized copy at Aspatria

== Archaeological Context ==
Gosforth church displays a number of associated artefacts. There is what may be a fragment of another cross, showing the god Thor fishing. This stone was discovered by C A Parker when measuring the Gosforth Cross in March 1882. He noticed a large flat stone, much worn as a sort of step, on the north-east side of the Cross's socket stone. He moved the stone so he could examine the socket, but found that the stone itself had carvings on the hidden face. It was soon identified by Professor Stephens as Thor's fishing trip when he failed to catch the Midgard Serpent.

There are also three cross heads, thought to be from similar crosses to the one still standing; there is the stump of one cross in the graveyard. All these fragments were recorded by Parker in his 1882 drawing of the Cross, and can be seen on view embedded in an interior wall of the church.

In the church are two carved Viking hogback stones. These were found under the foundations of a 12th-century wall of the church during restoration in 1896–97. The early 11th century is the latest possible date.

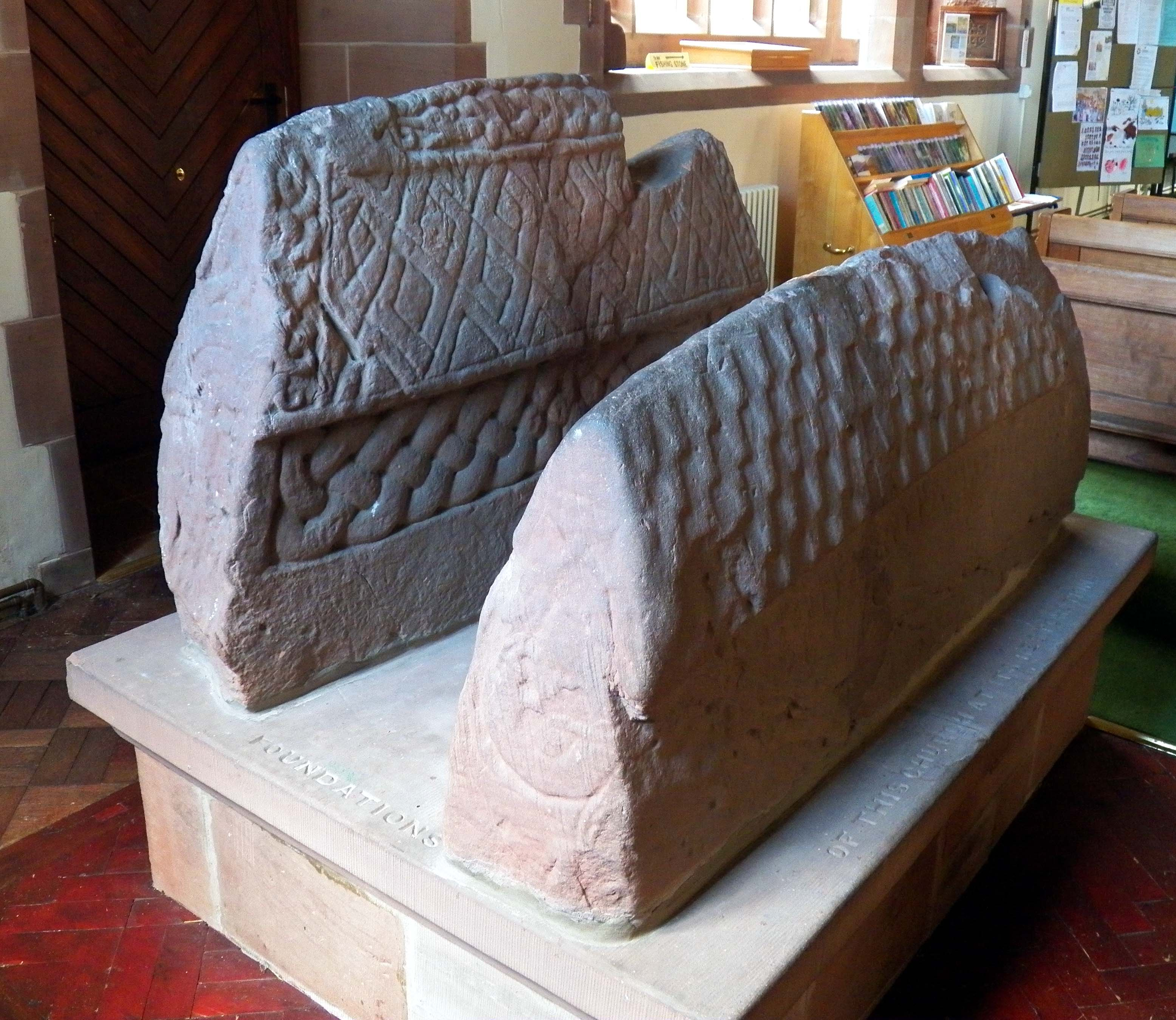
The hogback tombs in the church

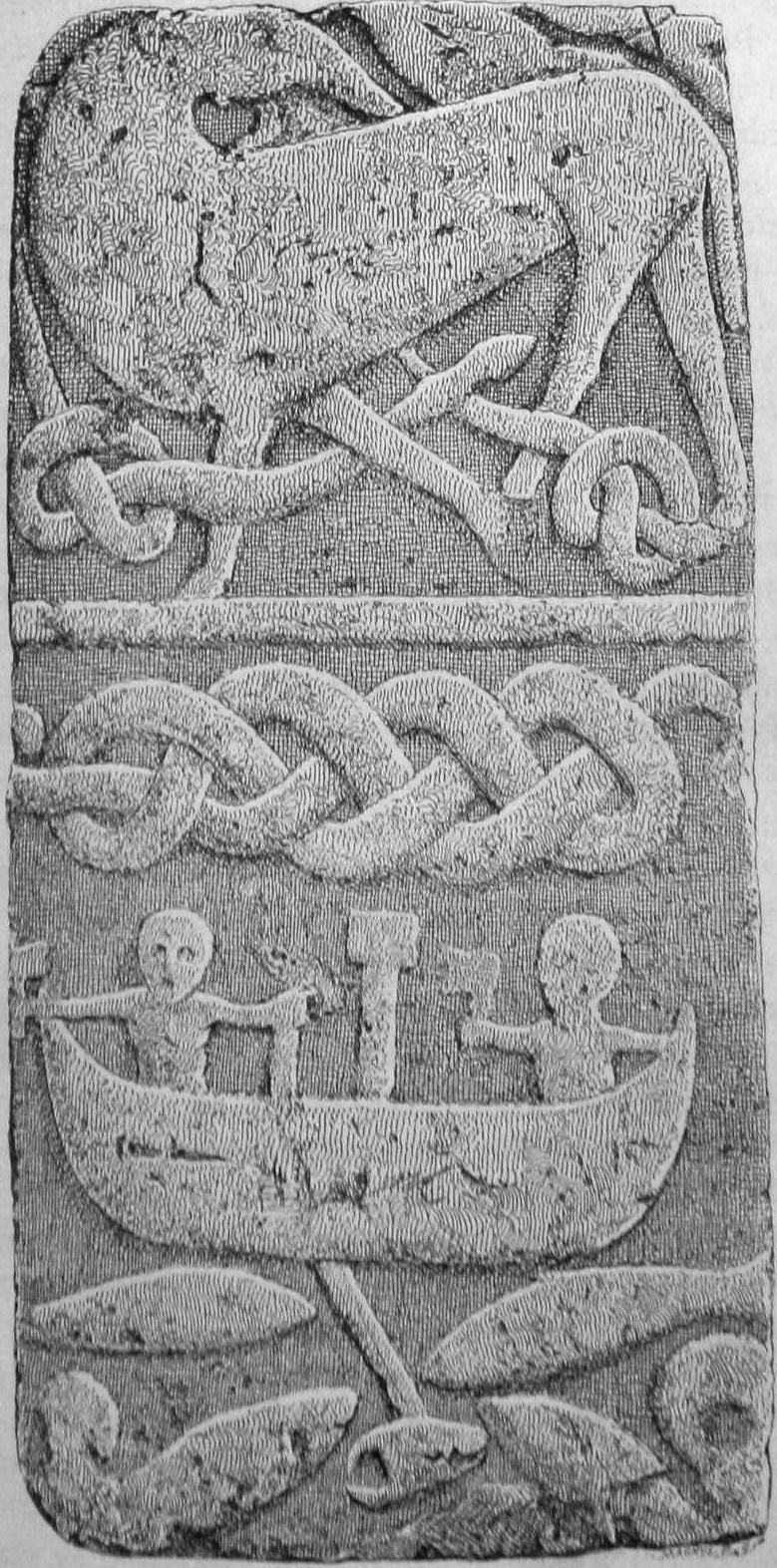
Engraving of a stone panel, possibly part of a second cross, showing Thor fishing.

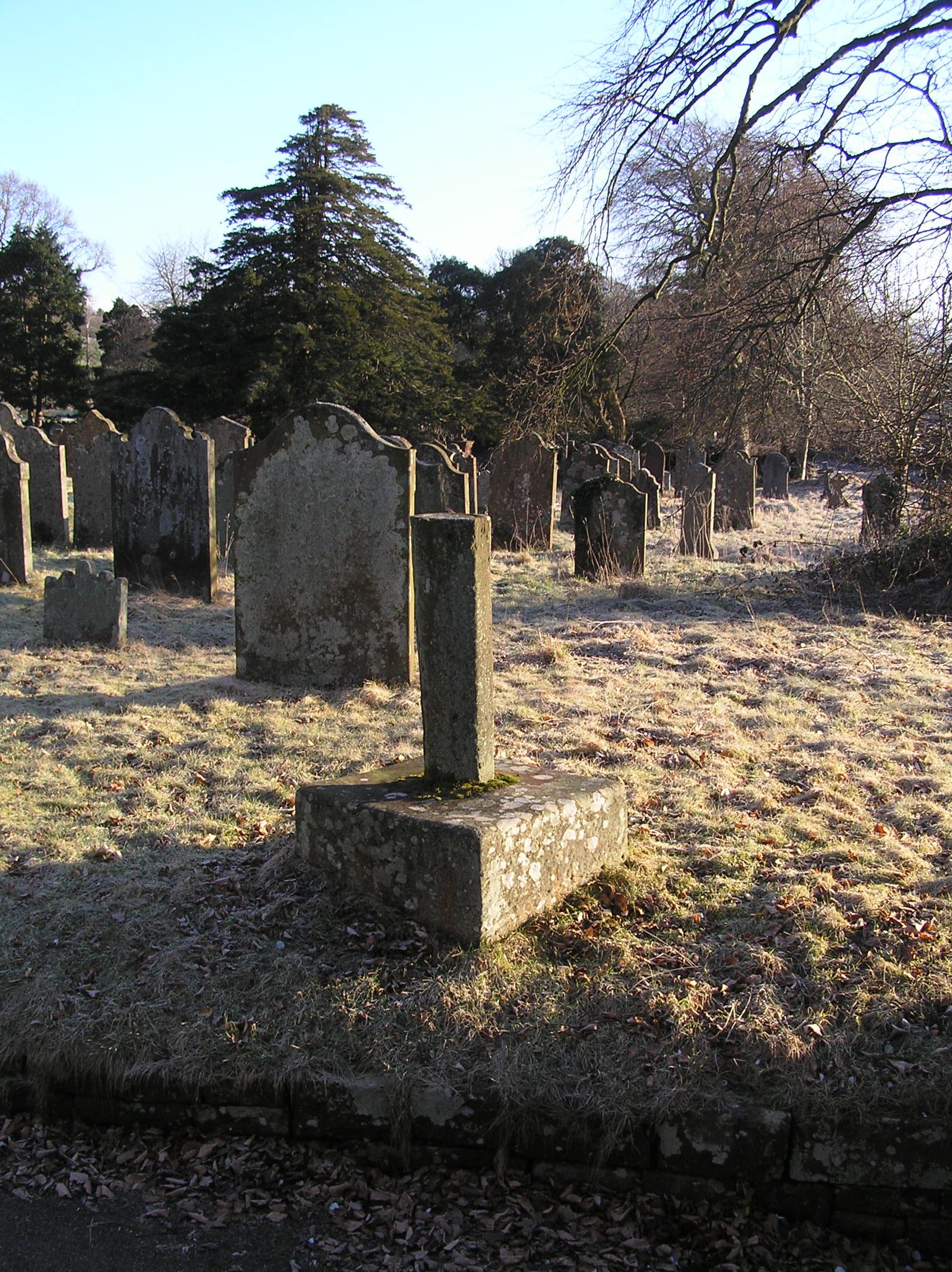
The stump of another cross
