= Casson (name) =

Casson may refer to the following people:

Given name

- Casson Ferguson (1891–1929), American film actor
- Casson Trenor, American environmentalist, social activist, and media personality

Surname

- A. J. Casson (1898–1992), Canadian artist
  - A. J. Casson Award
- Amy Casson, British slalom canoeist
- Andrew Casson (1943–2025), Anglo-American mathematician and academic
  - Casson invariant
  - Casson handle
- Ann Casson (1915–1990), English stage and film actress
- Beau Casson (born 1982), Australian cricketer
- Christopher Casson (1912–1996), English-born actor who became a citizen of Ireland in 1946
- Elizabeth Casson (1881–1954), British doctor and occupational therapy pioneer
- Felice Casson (born 1953), Italian magistrate and politician
- François Boux de Casson (1908–1981), French aristocrat, landowner and politician
- Henry Casson (1843–1912), American politician
- Henry Casson (cricketer) (1830–1902), English cricketer
- Herbert Newton Casson (1869–1951), Canadian author and journalist
- Hugh Casson (1910–1999), British architect
- Jacob Casson Geiger (1885–1981), city director of public health in San Francisco and Oakland, CA
- Johnnie Casson, English comedian
- Leslie Casson (1903–1969), English mediaevalist and art historian
- Lewis Casson (1875–1969), British actor, father of Ann
- Lionel Casson (1914–2009), American classicist
- Margaret Casson (1913–1999), British architect, designer and photographer, wife of Hugh
- Mark Casson (born 1945), British economist and academic
- Mary Casson (1914–2009), English theatre access
- Mel Casson (1920–2008), American cartoonist
- Michael Casson (1925–2003), English studio potter
- Rick Casson (born 1948), Canadian politician
- Tom Casson (born 1990), English rugby union player
- Walter Casson (1895–1965), English football forward
- William Casson (1796–1886), English botanist, seed merchant and historian
- William Thompson Casson (1844–1909), English coach designer and manufacturer
