= Fred Ashworth =

English rugby league & union footballer

Personal information
- Full name: Frederick William Ashworth
- Born: 14 January 1907 Watchhill, Cumberland, England
- Died: 9 September 1989 (aged 82) Oldham, Lancashire, England

Playing information

Rugby union
Club
Years	Team	Pld	T	G	FG	P
<1926–26	Aspatria RUFC

Rugby league
- Position: Forward
Club
Years	Team	Pld	T	G	FG	P
1926–39	Oldham	436	39	38		193
Representative
Years	Team	Pld	T	G	FG	P
1927–31	Cumberland	13	1	0	0	3

Frederick William Ashworth (14 January 1907 – 9 September 1989), also known by the nickname of "Basher", was an English rugby union and professional rugby league footballer who played in the 1920s and 1930s. He played club level rugby union (RU) for Aspatria RUFC, and representative level rugby league (RL) for Cumberland, and at club level for Oldham, as a forward, after retiring as a player he served Oldham as a member of the club's committee.

== Background ==
Fred Ashworth was born in Watchhill, Cumberland, to coalminer James Ashworth and Mary Ellen Ashworth.

== Playing career ==
=== Aspatria Rugby Union Club ===
Ashworth (or ‘Basher’ as he was known to his friends and colleagues) came to prominence when at the age of fourteen, he played in the local school team that won the Cumberland Silver Shield, a knockout competition open to boys aged sixteen and under. In 1924 the majority of the team were runners-up in the Cumberland Under 18’s Challenge Cup, after they were narrowly defeated by Silloth. In 1925, Ashworth captained the side that won the same competition, defeating Egremont by 11 points to nil. By 1925 he was a regular member of the senior squad and won a runners-up medal in that years Challenge Cup, when Aspatria were narrowly defeated by Workington.

In 1926, Ashworth, along with T. E Holliday signed professional forms for Oldham.

=== Oldham ===
Ashworth played in Oldham's 26–7 victory over Swinton in the 1927 Challenge Cup Final during the 1926–27 season at Central Park, Wigan, in front of a crowd of 33,448.

Ashworth is an Oldham Hall Of Fame Inductee.

=== County honours ===
Ashworth represented Cumberland (RL).

== Bibliography ==
- Terry Carrick (1995). Aspatria: The History Of A Rugby Union Football Club. Nottingham: Adland Press.
