= Casson (disambiguation) =

Casson is a Native American tribe in central eastern California.

Casson may also refer to:

- Casson, Loire-Atlantique, a commune in western France
- Irving and Casson, a firm of interior designers and furniture makers based in Boston, Massachusetts, U.S.
- Casson (name)
- Casson handle in mathematics
- Casson invariant in mathematics
- A. J. Casson Award given to an artist
- Diphwys Casson Quarry in Wales
