= Aspatria =

Town in Cumbria, England

Coordinates: 54.7633°N 3.3281°W

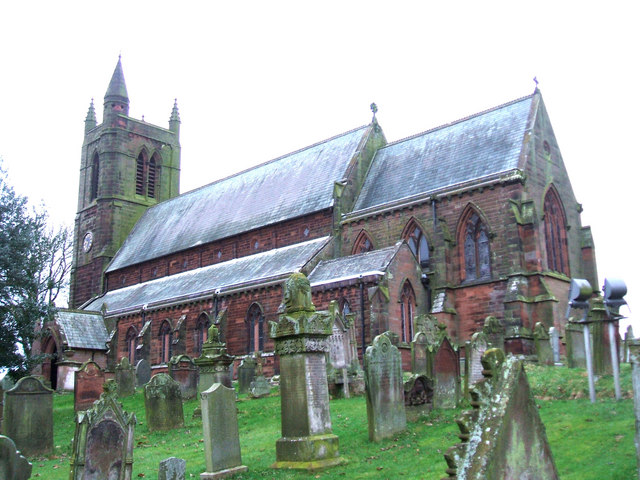
- St Kentigern's Church

- Location within Cumbria
- Population: 2,813 (Parish, 2021)
- OS grid reference: NY145417
- Civil parish: Aspatria
- Unitary authority: Cumberland
- Ceremonial county: Cumbria
- Region: North West
- Country: England
- Sovereign state: United Kingdom
- Post town: WIGTON
- Postcode district: CA7
- Dialling code: 016973
- Police: Cumbria
- Fire: Cumbria
- Ambulance: North West
- UK Parliament: Penrith and Solway

Aspatria /əsˈpeɪtriə/ is a town and civil parish in Cumberland, Cumbria, England. The town rests on the north side of the Ellen Valley, overlooking a panoramic view of the countryside, with Skiddaw to the South and the Solway Firth to the North. Its developments are aligned approximately east–west along the A596 Carlisle to Workington road and these extend to approximately 2 miles (3.2 km) in length. It lies about 8 miles (13 km) northeast of Maryport, a similar distance to the Southwest of Wigton, about 9 miles (14 km) north of Cockermouth and 5 miles (8.0 km) from the coast and Allonby. A Roman road leading from "Old Carlisle" to Ellenborough passed through the hamlet.

It is served by Aspatria railway station. Aspatria is located on the fringe of the English Lake District.

The parish church of St Kentigern was rebuilt in 1848. Fragments of masonry and crosses from earlier structures on the same site are preserved there.

== History ==
=== Pre Norman ===
Aspatria is an ancient settlement and seems to have been home to a group of Norsemen who fled to the area from Ireland around 900. In 1789, a surgeon by the name of Rigg employed a group of labourers to level a mound called Beacon Hill, situated close behind his house at Aspatria. After reaching a depth of about one metre they dug into a cavity walled around with large stones and found the skeleton of a Viking chief. At the head of the skeleton lay a sword almost five feet in length, with a remarkably broad blade, ornamented with a gold and silver handle. The scabbard of the sword was made of wood, lined with cloth. The workmen also unearthed several pieces of armour, a dirk with a silver studded handle, a golden buckled belt, and a breast plate. The artefacts remain the property of the British Museum. Further finds were made on the same site in 1997 when a mobile phone mast was being constructed.

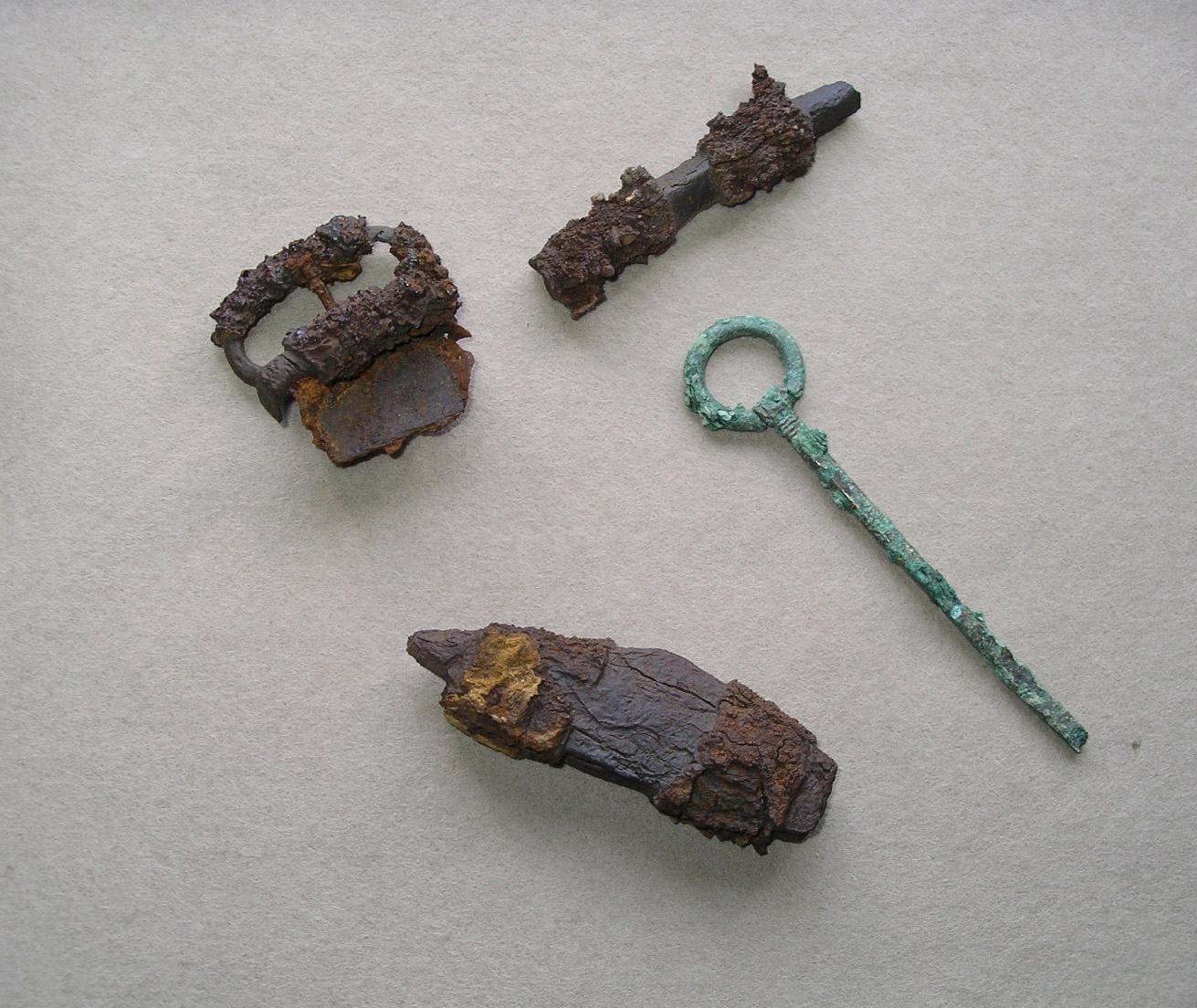
002 Aspatria Viking finds

=== The Manor ===
The manor of Aspatria is part of the ancient barony of Allerdale below Derwent. Awarded by Ranulph de Meschines, grantee of the whole of Cumberland from William the Conqueror, to Waltheof, son of Gospatrick, Earl of Dunbar, from whom the obsolete name of Aspatrick, may have been derived. Upon the division of the estates of William Fitz Duncan, and his wife Alice de Romney, among their three daughters, the manor passed to Alice, the youngest. However, Alice died without issue and the estates passed to an elder sister who had married into the Lucy family. The latter family terminated in a female heir Maud de Lucy. She married Henry Percy, the first Earl of Northumberland, who received the whole of her estates. It remained in this family through eleven generations before passing by the marriage of Lady Elizabeth, sole daughter and heiress of Josceline Percy to Charles Seymour, sixth Earl of Somerset. In recent times it again passed by a female heir to the Wyndham family, from whom it has descended to Lord Leconfield and now Lord Egremont.

The village stands at the northern end of the West Cumberland Coalfield and there have been mines in the area since the 16th century. The opening of the Maryport and Carlisle Railway, in 1842, led to a rapid expansion of the industry. The Brayton Domain Collieries sank five different pits around the town at various times and there were also mines near Mealsgate, Baggrow and Fletchertown. In 1902, a new mine was sunk at Oughterside. The last pit in the town, Brayton Domain No.5, closed in 1940.

In 1870, one of England's first farmers' co-operatives, the Aspatria Agricultural Cooperative Society was established here with offices in the market square, facing the Aspatria Agricultural College which flourished from 1874 until 1925.

Sir Wilfrid Lawson MP (1829–1906) lived at Brayton Hall just outside the town. He was a committed nonconformist and a leader of the Temperance Movement. His memorial stands in the market square, topped by a bronze effigy of St George slaying the dragon – said to represent the demon drink. Brayton Hall was destroyed by fire in 1918.

=== Toponymy ===
According to one source, the origins of the name of Aspatria lie in Old Scandinavian and Celtic. It translates as "Ash-tree of St Patrick", and is composed of the elements askr (Old Scandinavian for "ash-tree") and the Celtic saint's name. The order of the elements of the name, with the ash-tree coming before the name of the saint, is particular to Celtic place-names. The following forms of the name have been found in various charters:- Estpatrick in 1224, Asepatrick 1230, Aspatric 1233, Askpatrik 1291, Assepatrick 1303, Aspatrick 1357, Aspatre 1491. The first entry in the parish register referring to the town as Aspatria in preference to the name Aspatrick or Aspatricke appears in 1712. It appears in the handwriting of the then vicar David Bell. For the next fifty years the spelling fluctuated until eventually Aspatria became the dominant name. When Charles Dickens and Wilkie Collins passed through the town in 1857 they referred to the name Spatter which is not too dissimilar to 'Speatrie' the name locals prefer. William Brough, a railway porter, discharging third class passengers after their arrival at Aspatria from the Bolton Loop railway connection would cry 'Speatrie Loup Oot'. Second class passengers would detect "Speatrie change ere for Measyat", while first class passengers heard a polite invitation, "Aspatriah, change heah for Mealsgate."

There is a legend that the name comes from the ash tree that grew when St. Patrick's staff, the Bachal Isu, took root in the ground because it took so long for him to manage to convert the people from this area to Christianity.

== Governance ==
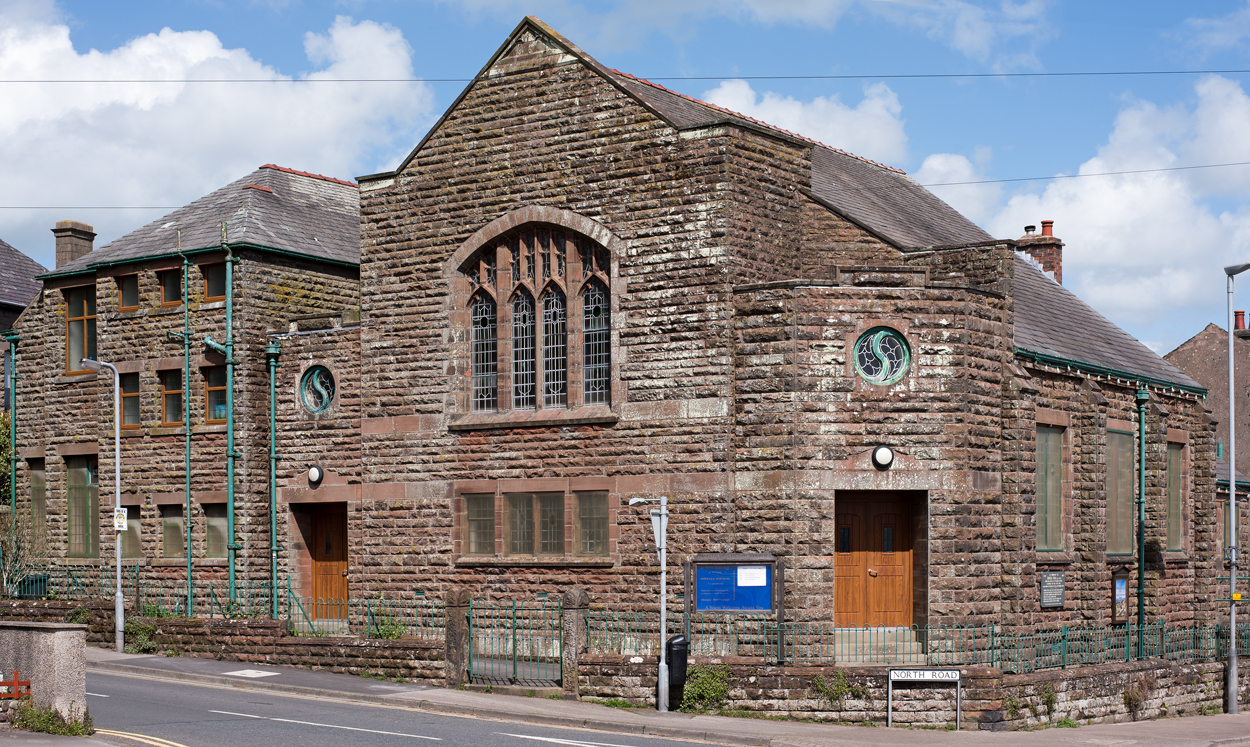
Aspatria Methodist Church: also serves as town council's meeting place

There are two tiers of local government covering Aspatria, at parish (town) and unitary authority level: Aspatria Town Council and Cumberland Council. The town council meets at Aspatria Methodist Church.

The town is in the parliamentary constituency of Penrith and Solway, and is represented by Markus Campbell-Savours of the Labour Party since the 2024 general election.

=== Administrative history ===
Aspatria was an ancient parish in the historic county of Cumberland. The parish was subdivided into four townships: Allhallows, Aspatria and Brayton, Hayton and Mealo, and Oughterside and Allerby. Allhallows had become a separate parish by the 18th century. From the 17th century onwards, parishes were gradually given various civil functions under the poor laws, in addition to their original ecclesiastical functions. In some cases, including Aspatria, the civil functions were exercised by each township separately rather than the parish as a whole. In 1866, the legal definition of 'parish' was changed to be the areas used for administering the poor laws, and so the other three townships also became separate civil parishes.

In 1892, a local government district called Aspatria was created, covering the civil parish of Aspatria and Brayton. Such districts were reconstituted as urban districts under the Local Government Act 1894. Aspatria Urban District was abolished in 1934, with the area being reclassified as a rural parish called Aspatria within the Wigton Rural District.

Wigton Rural District was abolished in 1974, becoming part of the borough of Allerdale in the new county of Cumbria. Allerdale was in turn abolished in 2023 when the new Cumberland Council was created, also taking over the functions of the abolished Cumbria County Council in the area.

== Religious worship ==
Prior to the opening of the Brayton Domain Collieries the people of Aspatria had two places of worship, the long established Anglican parish church of St. Kentigern's and a non-conformist chapel of the Congregationalist persuasion, built by Sir Wilfrid Lawson, in 1826. The latter is now a café with dwelling behind. However, with the influx of new workers came a demand for new institutions. In 1864, the Primitive Methodists built a chapel in the lower end of Lawson Street. Twenty years later, to cater for their expanding congregation they built a new chapel, with adjoining manse for the minister, at the junction of Queen Street and Brayton Road, while retaining the original building for use as a Sunday school. In the 1980s they sold the property, which the new owner demolished and replaced with a private house. In 1874, a group of Bible Christians, originally from Cornwall built a chapel at the bottom of Richmond Hill. This is also now the site of a private house. The Wesleyan Methodists built their first chapel on the corner of North Road and Queen Street in 1898. This proved too small and was replaced by the existing building in 1921. Although the small numbers of Roman Catholics have had a variety of meeting places over the years, they have never built a church.

== Education ==
There are two primary schools in the town: Oughterside Primary School and Richmond Hill School.

Beacon Hill Community School is a secondary school in Aspatria. The school serves the town and neighbouring villages.

== Neighbouring parishes ==
The parish is bounded on the North by the parishes of Bromfield and Westnewton; on the West by Gilcrux and Crosscanonby; on the South by Plumbland and Torpenhow; and on the East by Bromfield and Allhallows.

== Industry ==
There is a small industrial area next to the railway station where:

- Mattress manufacturer Sealy have maintained their British head office since 1974. It was announced in May 2020 that the factory will close;
- First Milk creamery (formerly owned by the Milk Marketing Board), a farmers' co-operative, produces Lake District Cheese, now the third best-selling Cheddar Brand in the UK. 60 tonnes are produced daily, using 800,000 litres of milk; and
- Aspatria Farmers Limited, (formerly the Aspatria Agricultural Cooperative Society) is based.

== Demography ==
The population has greatly increased since the mid-19th century. In 1801, the village comprised 98 dwellings with a population of 321. By 1851, there were 236 family entities, comprising 1,123 residents; by 1871, the numbers had increased to 1,778; and twenty years later stood at 2,714. By the start of the 20th century, the population had risen to 2,885; twenty years later it peaked at 3,521. Although the population slumped in the 1930s to 3,189, it recovered to 3,500, in 1951; and by 1981, the population appeared stable at 2,745. At the 2021 census, the population of the civil parish was 2,813.

== Media ==
Local news and television programmes are provided by BBC North East and Cumbria and ITV Border. Television signals are received from the Caldbeck TV transmitter. Local radio stations are BBC Radio Cumbria and Greatest Hits Radio Cumbria & South West Scotland. The town is served by the local newspaper, News and Star.

== Sport ==
Aspatria Hornets are the local rugby league team. Aspatria is also home to rugby union club Aspatria RUFC, currently playing in the RFU's North Lancashire/Cumbria Division. The 'Aspatria Eagles' are the club's second team, and the 'Aspatria Sinners' are the women's team. Aspatria FC are the town's football club who compete in the Tesco Cumberland County Premier League.

The opening stage of the Tour of Britain Women's cycle race passed through Aspatria in 2026.

== Transport ==
The town has one bus route serving it. The 300 to Workington or to Carlisle via Wigton. This service is operated by Stagecoach.

Aspatria train station has services to Whitehaven or Carlisle with a few continuing to Barrow-in-Furness or Manchester Airport.

== Notable people ==
- Sheila Fell, artist, born in Aspatria
- Jenny Cowern, artist, lived at Langrigg, Aspatria
- Thomas Holliday, rugby international, had a drapery and ironmonger's business in Queen Street
- Sir Wilfrid Lawson, 2nd Baronet of Brayton, temperance campaigner and Liberal Party politician
- Henry Thompson, veterinary surgeon, pioneer agriculturalist and author
- Greg Ridley, Rock musician
- William Thompson Casson, coach designer and manufacturer
- Rev. William Slater Calverley, antiquarian
- Thomas Farrall, author, teacher and agriculturalist
- Henry J. Webb, principal of Aspatria Agricultural College
- Roland Stobbart, Speedway rider
- Maurice Stobbart, Speedway rider
- Dr William Perry Briggs, Medical Officer of Health to Aspatria Urban District Council (1892–1928)

== See also ==
- Listed buildings in Aspatria

== Bibliography ==
- Rev. William Slater Calverley; W. G. Collingwood M.A. (1899). Early Sculptured Crosses, Shrines and Monuments in the Present Diocese of Carlisle. Kendal: Titus Wilson.
- A. D. Mills (1998). Oxford Dictionary of Place-Names. Oxford: Oxford.
- Wilkie Collins and Charles Dickens (2011). The Lazy Tour of Two Idle Apprentices. London: Hesperus Press Ltd.
- T. Bulmer (1901). History and Directory of Cumberland. Preston: T. Bulmer & Co. Hesperus Press Ltd.
- J. B. Bailey (1920). History of the Churches in the Maryport Rural Deanery. Cockermouth: Times Office.
- J. Rose; M. Dunglinson (1987). Aspatria. Chichester: Phillimore.
