= Watchhill =

Hamlet in Cumbria, England

Coordinates: 54.772°N 3.260°W

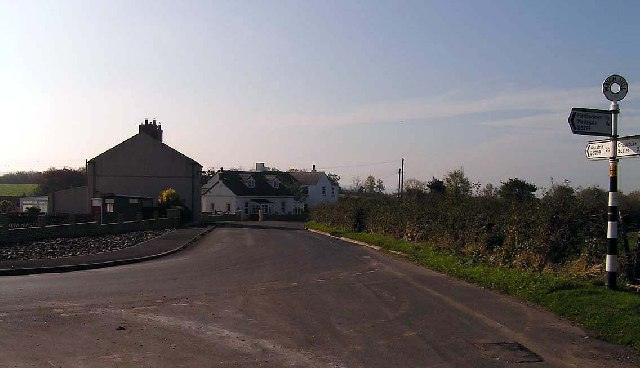
- Watchhill in October 2005

- Location in Allerdale, Cumbria Location within Cumbria
- OS grid reference: NY189426
- Civil parish: Allhallows
- Unitary authority: Cumberland
- Ceremonial county: Cumbria
- Region: North West
- Country: England
- Sovereign state: United Kingdom
- Post town: WIGTON
- Postcode district: CA7
- Dialling code: 016973
- Police: Cumbria
- Fire: Cumbria
- Ambulance: North West
- UK Parliament: Penrith and Solway

Watchhill is a hamlet in the parish of Allhallows, Cumbria, England. The parish had 538 recorded residents in the 2001 census. Watchhill is sited near the highest point in the parish, most of the houses fronting the B5299 road from Caldbeck Common to Aspatria. It is so named because it once housed a beacon allowing residents to be alerted to raiders stealing cattle. In the days of the border reivers such warnings were vital, and allowed cattle and people to be protected in the nearby pele tower at Harbybrow.
