= Harry Elliot =

British physicist

Harry Elliot CBE FRS
- Born: Henry Elliot; 28 June 1920; Mealsgate
- Died: 5 July 2009 (aged 89); Tunbridge Wells
- Education: University of Manchester
- Spouse: Betty Leyman
- Children: Brian and Jean
- Awards: See list
- Scientific career
- Fields: Cosmic rays. Space science.

Henry Elliot CBE FRS, (28 June 1920 – 5 July 2009) was a British space scientist, and Emeritus Professor of Physics, at the University of London.

== Biography ==
Harry Elliot was born at Mealsgate, near Wigton, Cumberland, the son of Thomas, farmer, and Hannah Elizabeth (née Littleton), who died in 1928. He was brought up by two elder sisters. At secondary school Elliot was interested in chemistry and, increasingly, in physics. He attended the Victoria University of Manchester in 1938, where the physics department was headed by Patrick Blackett. He graduated top of his class in the summer of 1941 with the guarantee, after the war was over, of a postgraduate stipend to study for a doctorate.

Elliot joined the Royal Air Force and succeeded in entering his first choice of Coastal Command. After appropriate training he was posted to Devon, where Coastal Command was hunting U-boats in the Western Approaches and the Bay of Biscay. Amongst other roles he worked as a liaison officer, at RAF Dunkeswell, near Honiton, initially with the US Air Force and later with the US Navy.

In 1946 Elliot returned to Manchester to take up his scholarship. His work was mainly in measuring the variations of cosmic rays over time, both at ground level and using airborne devices; he published an important review article summarizing cosmic ray intensity variations in 1952. In the following year he was invited by Blackett to join him in a move to Imperial College London. They were both involved in the International Geophysical Year, which in fact lasted 18 months (July 1957 to December 1958).

The 1950s saw the start of the space age. After the USSR launched its first Earth Satellite in 1957 the International Council of Scientific Unions formed a special Committee on Space Research (COSPAR), which held its first meeting in London in October 1958. At its second meeting the Americans offered that the newly formed NASA would be prepared to launch foreign payloads and even spacecraft. The British were quick to follow up on this and a group went to the USA three months later to take up the offer, thus beginning work on the Ariel series of rockets. Elliot was selected to build a cosmic ray detector for Ariel 1. In January 1960 he went with Sir Harrie Massey FRS and Peter Willmore to Washington to agree the payload and details of cooperation.

In that same year Elliot was promoted to a chair at Imperial, and at his inaugural lecture he displayed the engineering model of the cosmic ray detector he was to fly on Ariel 1. The spacecraft itself was launched in May 1962. It was a mixed success. The instrument designed to separate proton and heavier particle fluxes was effectively blinded by an artificial radiation belt created by the American Starfish high-altitude nuclear detonation.

Elliot played a part in the early days of the European space programme, which began with the formation of ESRO in 1964. Six years later it was merged with ELDO to form the European Space Agency. Three of the first four ESRO spacecraft had instruments provided by Elliot and his group at Imperial. He later became involved in the ESA–NASA International Sun Earth Explorer (ISEE) project, providing instruments for all three spacecraft.

In 1965 the UK government established the Science Research Council (SRC). Elliot was immediately involved in two of its main committees, and was moved to the board of them both in 1967. He served until 1978, with the last three years as chairman.

Elliot’s involvement in Europe and ESA in subsequent years is extensively described in the Royal Society’s biographical memoir, and in a symposium held at Imperial College on 11 November 2009.

=== Family ===
During his time with Coastal Command in Devon, Harry Elliot met Betty Leyman, also with the Command. They married in Cornwall in 1943, and had two children: Brian and Jean.

Betty died in Tunbridge Wells on 25 January 2007. Harry died there on 5 July 2009.

== Honours ==
- 1957 Honorary Professor of the Universidad Mayor de San Andrés, La Paz, Bolivia
- 1961 Lord Rutherford Award of the Institute of Radio Engineers
- 1963 Academician of International Academy of Astronautics
- 1965 Honorary Associate of the Royal College of Science
- 1972 Edward Appleton lecture of the Institution of Electrical Engineers
- 1973 Fellow of the Royal Society
- 1976 Holweck Prize and Medal of the Institute of Physics and the French Physical Society
- 1976 Commander of the Order of the British Empire
- 1978 President of the Physics and Mathematics section, British Association
- 1983 Member of the World Academy of Art and Science
- 1984 Fellow of the Royal Astronomical Society
