= William Thompson Casson =

William Thompson Casson (1844–1909) was a leading English coach designer and coach manufacturer, who, in the latter part of the nineteenth century. designed and built coaches for Queen Victoria and other members of the European nobility. His reputation earned him many honours and accolades; he was elected member of the Royal Society of Arts, and received the rare honour: Freedom of the City of London.

== Early Days ==
William Thompson Casson was born at Aspatria, Cumberland in 1844. After losing his parents in early childhood he became ward to his grandparents, local weavers, Robert and Isabella Burnett. After receiving an elementary education at the local school, he became an apprentice to John Ferguson, an Aspatria coach-builder of some repute. At work he had a meteoric rise; he trained as a wheelwright, developed into a draughtsman, and became Works Manager, before the age of twenty-five. Casson was also a small-time bicycle manufacturer in his own right, building his first bike simply because none of the ones on the market fitted his requirements. According to contemporary reports the finished design was not too dissimilar to the modern cycle. A close friend and fellow Aspatrian, Thomas Walker, founder of the Cockermouth monumental masons firm of Walker Brothers, bought one. Walker was apprenticed to Henry Graves, quarry owner and mason, who in his capacity of foreman supervised the building of Aspatria vicarage, and the churches of Bridekirk and Silloth. According to Walker, the sight of Casson speeding along the streets of Aspatria with his feet resting on the handlebars brought terror to the entire neighbourhood. He also enrolled for part-time education at the newly established Aspatria Agricultural College and became one of the institutions earliest successes. In 1875, the court of the Worshipful Company of Coachmakers and Coach Harness Makers of London bestowed a number of honours. He obtained a First Class prize for plane, practical and solid geometry; a Second Class prize for theoretical mechanics; a bronze medal and a technology prize of two guineas. While at the 'Technology of Carriage Making' examination, held on behalf of the Royal Society of Arts he gained an additional First Class Certificate and a prize of £5. In 1876, he won a further silver medal and also a Certificate of Merit for the best treatise on carriage construction.

== London ==
In 1877 Casson married the daughter of Joseph Charters of Baggrow, Cumberland and migrated to London, where he became representative to Messrs Hooper & Co., coachmakers to Queen Victoria. The Worshipful Company's annual report for 1877 drew special attention to Casson's technical ability in the design of a Salisbury Boot. The boot was of curved form covered with leather, placed on the front gearing under the driver's seat. In the 19th century it was much in fashion for dress carriages of the aristocracy. Casson had displayed not only a good practical knowledge of construction, but a thorough scientific knowledge of design methodology. The receipt of a further silver medal, and the company's certificate for four outline drawings, plans and sections for Omnibus, Barouche, and Salisbury Boot brought his ability to a wide audience. In 1877, on behalf of his employer, he visited the centennial Exhibition in Philadelphia, USA, where he obtained the medal and highest commendation awarded to an international exhibitor.

== Master coachbuilder ==
By 1878, Casson had become a ‘master coachbuilder’ and in consequence entered into a partnership with Cook and Co., the Malvern Link, Carriage Works in Malvern, Worcestershire. He also became one of seven representatives chosen by the Carriage Builders Institute and the Royal Society of Arts to attend and report on the carriages exhibited at the 1878 Paris Exhibition. Later that year he exhibited a series of eighteen engravings depicting facets of carriage design at an exhibition held in the Mansion House, London. In 1880, Casson took the first prize for a two-wheeled brake in an open competition at Newcastle upon Tyne. In 1990, the Worshipful Company of Coach and Harness Makers of London awarded him, not only the freedom of their company but also the freedom of the City of London, a joint honour only bestowed by that company on three previous occasions. He later became a member of the Royal Society of the Arts. In 1891, Casson took over the business, Starkey and Co, of Ross on Wye and continued to run a successful business until his death in 1909.

== Bibliography ==
- J. D. Rose; M. Dunglinson (1987). Aspatria: A Cumbrian Town. Chichester: Phillimore & Co Ltd. ISBN 978-0-85033-635-1.
