= Aspatria Agricultural Cooperative Society =

Modern logo

The Aspatria Agricultural Cooperative Society, since 1990 Aspatria Farmers, is a British agricultural cooperative established in Aspatria, Cumberland in 1870. It was founded after a group of local farmers combined to deal in artificial manures, feeding stuffs, seeds, and agricultural implements. Although formed in a small rural community, the society had the integrity to sue agricultural agencies when their guarantees did not conform to their advertised products. Although one of the first organisations of its kind, it continued to flourish when others fell by the wayside and is now arguably the oldest of its kind in the world. Moreover, the society became a catalyst which empowered three local men to further the cause of agriculture by establishing the Aspatria Agricultural College, the second of its kind in the world.

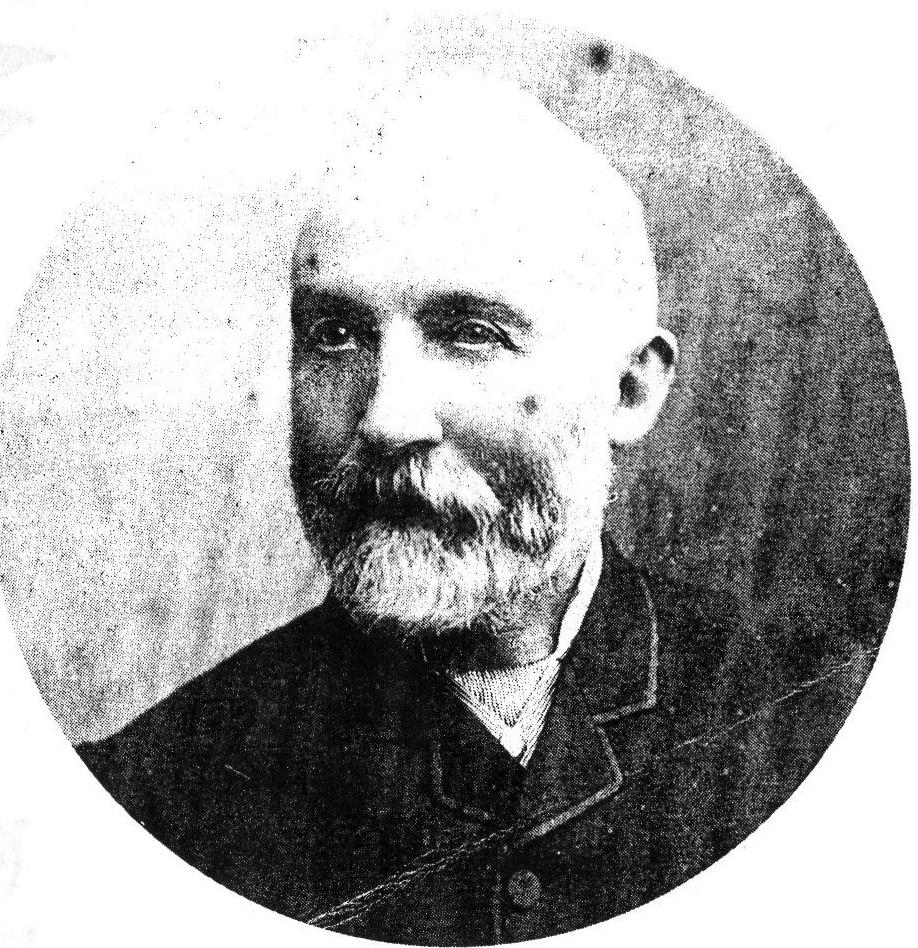
Mr William Norman MRAC, of High Close farm, Aspatria

== Early beginnings ==
In 1869, a quantity of artificial ‘turnip’ manure priced at £7.50 per ton arrived in the Aspatria district. Of the recipients were John Twentyman of Hawkrigg Farm, and William Norman of High Close, bought 5 tons and 2 tons respectively. Norman, a qualified chemist, doubted the integrity of the declared chemical properties and sought verification from former colleague, Thomas Anderson, of Glasgow University. Anderson confirmed Norman's suspicions, as the manure contained only 13 per cent of soluble phosphates with a value of £2 50p per ton. In the meantime, Twentyman, acting independently applied the manure to a field of turnips and experienced disappointing results. The two neighbours met through the intermediary of local veterinary surgeon Henry Thompson MRCVS who suggested they form an Agricultural Society at Aspatria, with the primary aim of initiating an annual Agricultural Show. It was during a speech at the inaugural show dinner, in September 1869, that Sir Wilfrid Lawson, 2nd Baronet of Brayton advised local farmers to follow his example and join the Agricultural and Horticultural Association, established by Edward Owen Greening at Manchester two years earlier. Twentyman took the initiative one stage further and organised a meeting of local landlords and tenant farmers with a view of establishing a small company for buying fertilisers and feed stuff at a guaranteed quality. At a meeting on 24 January 1870, twenty members agreed to draw up a list of rules, adopt a motto ‘each for all and all for each’, appoint Henry Thompson as secretary, on an initial salary of £65 per annum, and to purchase 160 subscription shares at £1 each. On 14 April the society, the first of its kind in Cumberland, registered the company under the Industrial and Provident Societies Act 1893 (56 & 57 Vict. c. 39).

== The rules ==
The society stated one of its objective was to reduce sale of inferior or adulterated articles by giving members oversight of purchasing through an annually elected committee. It maintained that members could purchase elsewhere if they found better alternatives and that surplus profits, after operating expenses and interest on capital, would be returned to purchasing members. the society also stated that it intended to use product analyses and supplier guarantees as measures to maintain the quality and purity of goods, describing this as a particular focus of its operations.

== An extensive court case ==
Later that year a vessel arrived in Whitehaven harbour carrying a cargo of high quality Peruvian guano, reported to contain 17 per cent ammonia. The society purchased 50 tons, and dispersed it amongst their membership. Norman took samples from several of the consignments which under analysis proved to contain no more than 13.45 per cent of the desired compound. The directors reacted with direct action and refrained from payment of the value of the difference, a sum of about £59. This action infuriated the seller who issued a writ in the high court. Although the initial ruling went against the society they immediately lodged an appeal. The case became protracted and journeyed through several courts eventually settling at the Committee to the House of Lords. After five years of squabbling the arbiter ruled in favour of Aspatria. Although the case cost the society a sum of £630, the seller’s legal expenses exceeded £2,400; furthermore the society had fulfilled one of its prime objectives 'value for money rather than profit'. The arbiter had settled the case but it took a further thirty-six years before the British government introduced legislation to guarantee the composition of fertilisers and animal feedstuff.

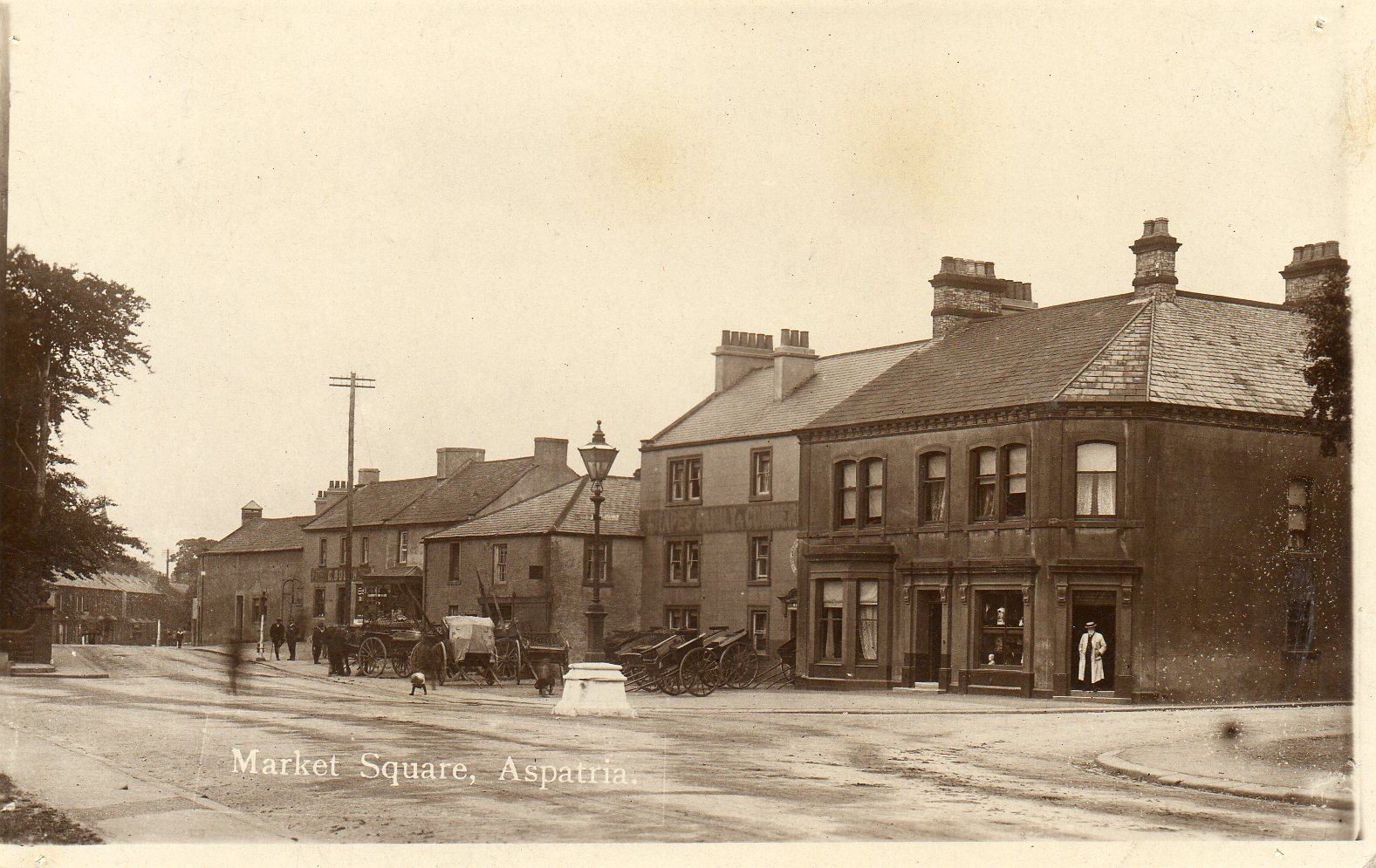
Aspatria Agricultural Cooperative Society Offices with Secretary Henry Thompson standing at the entrance

== A successful business ==
Sales in the opening six months amounted to £4,381, and generated a profit of £701, out of which the committee distributed 5 per cent on capital, working expenses involved in the establishing of the society £192, discount to purchasing members at time of sale £272, leaving £228 paid as dividend to purchasing members only. By 1900 membership had risen to 327 with annual sales totalling £13,467; almost all the profit being distributed to the membership as interest and dividends. On their 50th anniversary in 1920, Henry Thompson retired, after serving as secretary since the inception. In that year, the oldest society of its kind in Europe, reported a turnover of £40,000. In the period since its formation, total sales amounted to £800,000, with interest paid to shareholders of £4,000, and dividends to purchasing members of £8,100. Although Thompson left a society never seeking to become a market leader, it was steeped in genuine integrity, which continued to practice on the assumption that the reason for its existence was to guarantee the quality of its goods and services.

== Modern times ==
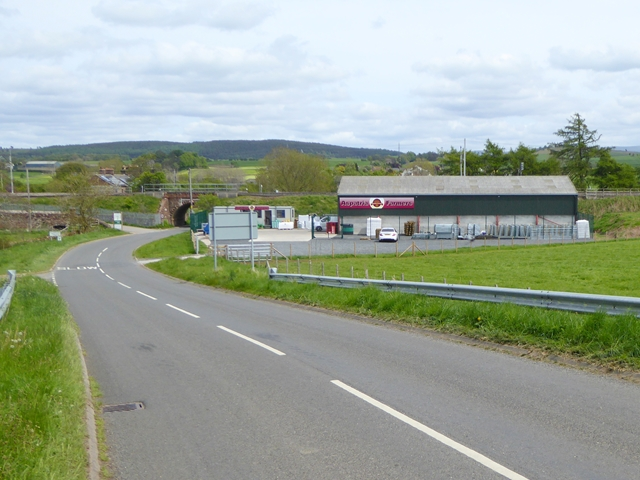
Aspatria Farmers shop in Hesket

In 1919, a special general meeting decided not to transfer the business to the Aspatria Cooperative Wholesale Society and natural growth continued. In 1976 the society dropped the word cooperative from its title and in 1990 underwent a further name change when they became known as Aspatria Farmers Ltd. On 1 November 2006, Aspatria Farmers took over Joseph Hillary Ltd an agricultural machine retailer and the business relocated to Hillary’s site on Station Road Aspatria.

The concept is very diversitial to the opel.
