= Allhallows, Cumbria =

Civil parish in Cumbria, England

Coordinates: 54.772°N 3.249°W

Allhallows
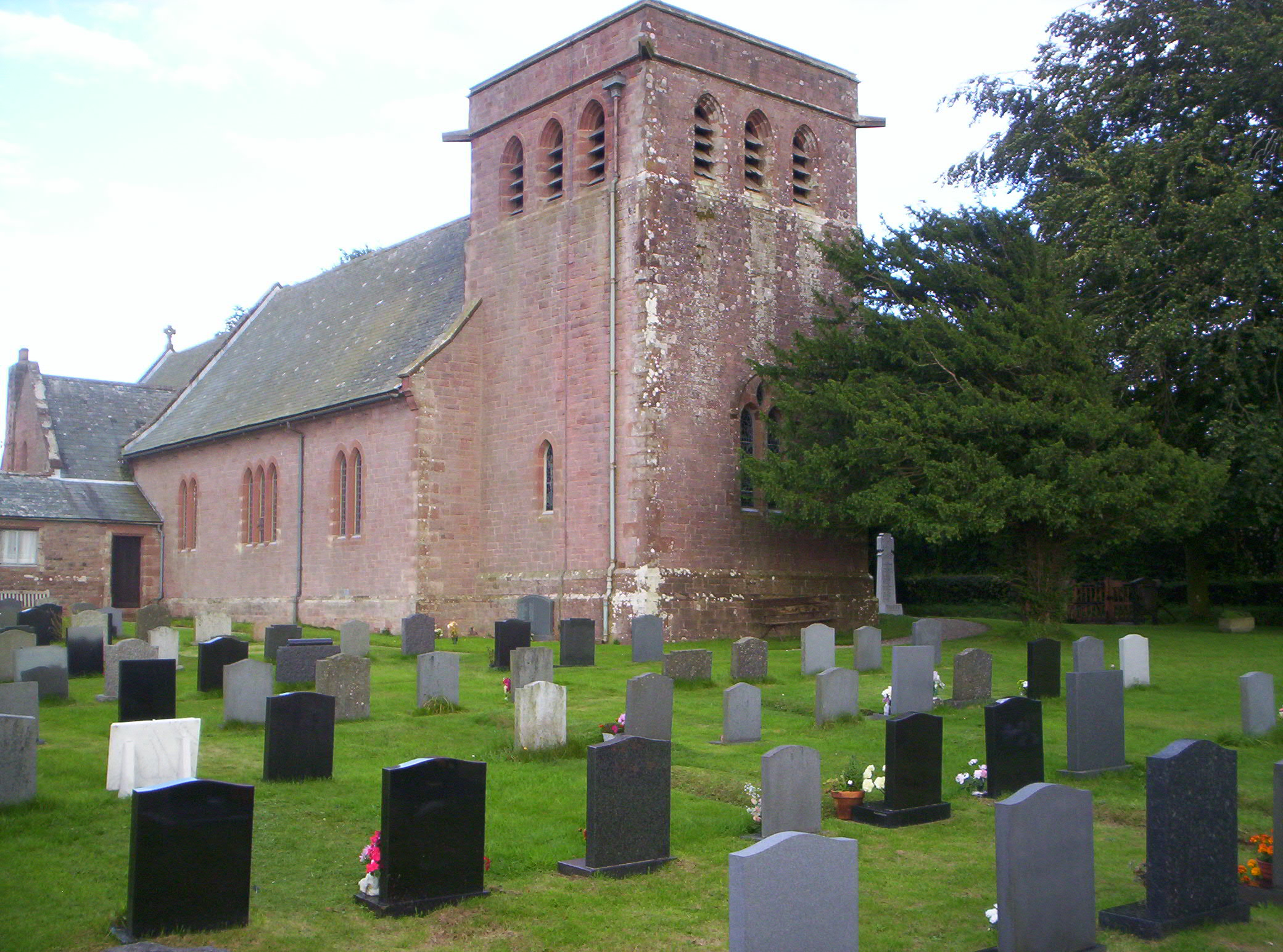
- Allhallows parish church

- Location within Cumbria
- Population: 527 (2021)
- OS grid reference: NY1942
- Civil parish: Allhallows
- Unitary authority: Cumberland
- Ceremonial county: Cumbria
- Region: North West
- Country: England
- Sovereign state: United Kingdom
- Post town: Wigton
- Postcode district: CA7
- Police: Cumbria
- Fire: Cumbria
- Ambulance: North West
- UK Parliament: Penrith and Solway

Allhallows is a civil parish in the Cumberland district of Cumbria, England. The largest settlement in the parish is Fletchertown, and the parish also contains the hamlets of Baggrow, Harbybrow and Watchhill. The population at the 2021 census was 527.

== History ==
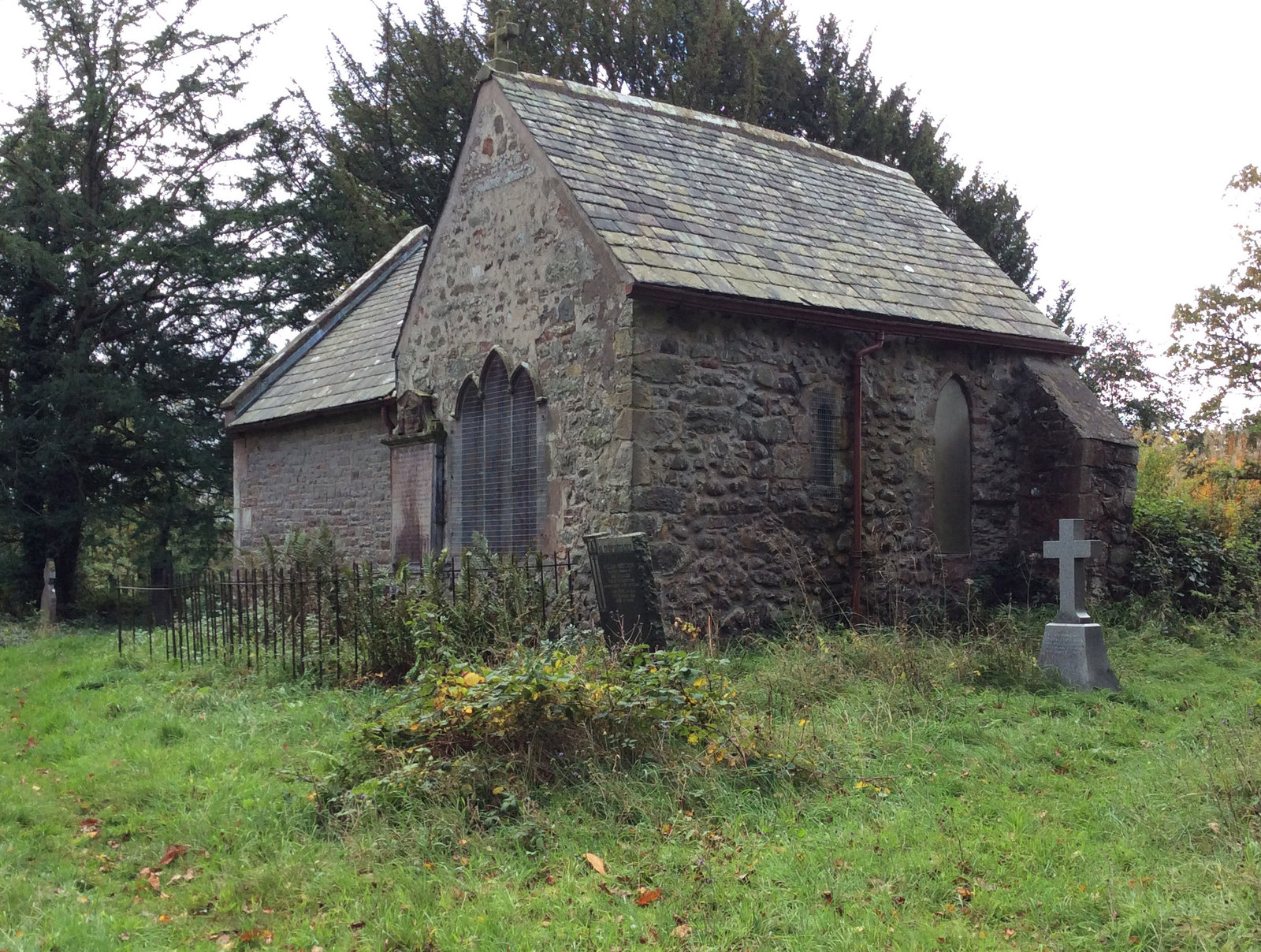
Old Allhallows Church

Allhallows was historically a chapelry within the ancient parish of Aspatria. It took its name from a chapel of ease dedicated to Allhallows (All Saints), which was built in the 12th century to serve the eastern part of Aspatria parish. By the 18th century, Allhallows was deemed a separate parish.

Fletchertown was developed as a mining village in the 19th century, growing to become the largest settlement in the parish. A new church, also dedicated to Allhallows, was completed in 1899 at a new site on the main road between Fletchertown and Watchhill.

== Governance ==
There are two tiers of local government covering Allhallows, at parish and unitary authority level: Allhallows Parish Council and Cumberland Council. The parish council meets at the Allhallows Centre in Fletchertown.

== Demography ==
At the 2021 census, the population was 527. The population had been 548 at the 2001 census and 546 at the 2011 census.

== See also ==
- Listed buildings in Allhallows, Cumbria
