= Janet Mitchell (artist) =

Canadian painter (1912-1998)

- Born: November 24, 1912; Medicine Hat, Alberta, Canada
- Died: February 26, 1998 (aged 85); Calgary, Alberta, Canada
- Education: Self-taught
- Known for: Painter
- Awards: member of the Royal Canadian Academy of Arts (1977); A. J. Casson Award, Canadian Society of Painters in Water Colour, 1979; Honorary doctorate from the University of Calgary (1988).
- Elected: Alberta Society of Artists; Canadian Society of Painters in Water Colour in 1971

People of the Street #24 (1970), from the Alberta Art Foundation Collection.

Janet Mitchell RCA LL.D (November 24, 1912 – February 26, 1998) was a Canadian modernist painter from Alberta, known for her fantasies of Calgary in watercolours and oils.

== Early life and career ==
Mitchell was born in Medicine Hat, Alberta, in 1912. Orphaned at a young age, she was adopted by John and Janet Mitchell and raised in Calgary. At age 9, her adoptive mother Janet died, and she was subsequently mistreated by her adoptive father's second wife, Rose. She left home at age 14, and in addition to continuing her education at Crescent Heights High School, she worked as a chambermaid to pay for her room and board. The following year, she moved back home, but Rose forced her to quit school at the end of Grade 9 to work as a full-time chambermaid, confiscating all of Janet's wages. At age 16, Mitchell convinced her father to allow her to enrol in business school to learn bookkeeping and shorthand. She graduated in 1929, and moved out on her own, but with the start of the Great Depression was unable to get any work other than as a chambermaid.

Shortly afterwards, Rose died, and her father married a third time. His new wife, Maude, was much more supportive of Mitchell's artistic inclinations, and gave her a set of oil paints for her 21st birthday. On her way to work at the Palliser Hotel, Mitchell would stop to sketch, but rather than sketching clean streets and storefronts, she chose alleyways and vacant lots, finding that they revealed "the truth of things". She also started to take art lessons, including evening classes at the Provincial Institute of Technology and Art (now the Alberta College of Art).

In 1938, Mitchell's father contracted cancer, and Mitchell returned home to help Maude care for him. After he died in 1939, Mitchell stayed on to provide for Maude. Deciding that she needed a better-paying job to support both of them, she enrolled in business school again, and after graduation in 1940, got a job with the Calgary office of the Income Tax Department, where she would continue to work for 22 years. She was still interested in art, and in 1942 she attended the Banff School of Fine Arts on a scholarship.

== Artist ==
1992 Canada Post stamp featuring Mitchell's watercolour Across the Tracks to Shop

Hoisting the Sails, an example of Mitchell's "whimsical, sometimes dreamlike images."

Art continued to play an increasingly important part of Mitchell's life. She first exhibited her work in 1947, then in 1948 showed her work in the Calgary Group exhibition at the Vancouver Art Gallery, considered to be one of the first modernist painting exhibitions of Alberta artists. Her first solo show was held in Toronto in 1949. She was mainly self-taught but in 1959, she studied at a summer workshop with artist Gordon Smith, and the following year, attended the Emma Lake Artists' Workshops in Saskatchewan. In 1962, at age 50, she made the decision to leave her government job and become a full-time artist. Numerous one-person exhibitions followed, mostly in Alberta, at the Allied Arts Centre in Calgary, Alberta (1963), and in Toronto, and many other galleries across Canada.

In 1965, the Save the Children Fund chose one of her paintings for their annual Christmas cards, making her the first Western Canadian artist to be so honoured. In 1966, she was one of only 15 Canadian artists commissioned to create paintings for Expo 67.

Following Maude's death in 1967, Mitchell sold their Calgary house and toured European museums and art galleries for a year. She then moved back to Calgary to return to her art.

Mitchell painted "highly realistic landscapes and townscapes of Western Canada", as well as "whimsical, sometimes dreamlike images in vibrant colors of cats, dogs, birds or fanciful floating people." In the Calgary Herald, Nancy Tousley wrote that "[l]ike Mitchell herself, [her] work has a buoyant spirit." She was influenced by Paul Klee and Marc Chagall whose work she saw on a trip in 1950 to New York. In Canadian art, she was influenced by David Milne and by Jock Macdonald who inspired her to explore the unconscious mind from 1946 to 1957. About her artistic process, Mitchell said,

"Who knows where a painting comes from? It can begin with the simplest thing. A sound, maybe, or the memory of a shape. I usually have no idea where I'm going. I can only look back and see where I've been. And it never gets any easier. Every time I begin, it's like the first time and the best painting is always one I'll do tomorrow."

Mitchell continued painting into her later years. In 1992, Canada Post chose one of her watercolours, Across the Tracks to Shop, to be featured on one of a series of stamps commemorating Canada's 125th year.

On February 26, 1998, she died of cancer. She was 85 years old.

== Legacy ==
In the years following her death, her paintings continued to attract interest. In 2007 her piece They Roam the Streets at Will sold for $9,950 at Hodgins Art Auctions.

== Awards and honours ==
- In 1977, the Glenbow Museum mounted a retrospective exhibition of her artistic career.
- In 1979, Mitchell was elected to the Royal Canadian Academy of Arts.
- In 1979, Mitchell was awarded the A.J. Casson Award by the Canadian Society of Painters in Water Colour
- In 1988, she earned an honorary doctor of law degree from the University of Calgary.

== Collections and archives ==
Mitchell's work is in the following public collections:

- Art Gallery of Windsor, Ontario
- Calgary Allied Arts Centre, Alberta
- Alix Art Gallery, Sarnia, Ontario
- University of Alberta
- University of Calgary, Alberta
- Museum London, Ontario
- National Gallery of Canada, Ottawa, Ontario

Her papers are in the Glenbow Museum, Janet Mitchell fonds.

== Bibliography ==
- Murray, Joan (1991). "Janet Mitchell: Celebrating Life". Janet Mitchell: Life and Art. Winnipeg: Hyperion Press. pp. 9–10. ISBN 0920534872.
- Devonshire Baker, Suzanne (1980). Artists of Alberta. Edmonton: University of Alberta. ISBN 0888640307. Archived from the original on June 15, 2020.
- MacDonald, Colin (1979). A Dictionary of Canadian Artists, vol.4 (Third ed.). Canadian Paperbacks Publishing Ltd. ISBN 0-919554-13 X. Archived from the original on June 10, 2020.
