= Thomas Farrall =

Thomas Farral (1837 – 19 August 1894) was a Cumbrian teacher, author and agricultural authority, who today, is most remembered for his Cumberland dialect poems and stories published in Betty Wilson's Cummerland Teals.

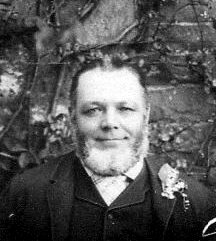
Thomas Farrall, author, teacher and agriculturalist

== Education ==
Thomas Farrall was born at Bassenthwaite, Cumberland in 1837. After a basic education he began life as an agricultural servant, working under his father for Sir Henry Vane, of Armathwaite Hall. He later enrolled at the Durham Training College to train as a teacher. He graduated with honours in 1858 and commenced his teaching career at the tiny village school at Isel, where he stayed for two years. Lavendale was his next appointment, where he remained for a further five years. He taught for seven years at Wetheral and three at Dovenby before accepting the head position from the newly formed Aspatria and Brayton School Board in 1874. He also taught part-time at the Aspatria Agricultural College.

== Agricultural matters ==
He began writing on agricultural matters for both the Carlisle Journal and the Carlisle Examiner, and later the West Cumberland Times and a wide variety of other Cumberland publications. Although a great deal of his writings appeared anonymously under the pseudonyms, ‘Rusticus’, ‘Agricola’, ‘Rover’, and ‘The Mud Student’. He won many prizes, writing essays on agricultural related subjects. From the Royal Highland and Agricultural Society of Scotland he obtained prizes for compositions, amongst which appeared.

- The West Highland Breed of Cattle - Fourth series Vol. VIII 1876
- The Ayrshire Breed of Cattle - Fourth series Vol. VIII 1876
- The Galloway Breed of Cattle
- The Comparative Advantages of Autumn and Spring Cultivation
- The Agriculture of Arran and Bute
- The Agriculture of Edinburgh and Linlithgow County - Fourth Series Vol. IX 1877
- The Dairies of Edinburgh

Some of these were printed in the Society's Transactions. Shortly before the Society precluded non-Scots from their competitions, they made him an honorary award of a Gold Medal for a work entitled ‘The Agriculture of the Island of Orkney’. He also received prizes from the Royal Agricultural Society of England. Perhaps his greatest achievement occurred when he won the £20 prize for an essay documenting the agricultural improvements that occurred in the 35 years prior to the time of writing. He also received several awards from the Royal Agricultural Society of Ireland. In 1877, Farrall helped the Ayrshire Cattle Society to compile the Ayrshire Herd Book, which contained a portrait of the famous Ayrshire cow, ‘Colly Hills’, considered at the time the finest specimen of its breed. He received the original painting from the Duchess of Athlone, and later donated the copyright to the Ayrshire Cattle Society. In 1878, he wrote a series of long essays on the subject of Modern Farming in West Cumberland, where after visiting neighbouring farms he wrote about their various techniques and methods. The following farms appeared.

- Shatton Hall Farm
- Gatesgarth
- Crosscannonby Hall
- Warthole Guards Farm
- Eaglesfield and Southwaite Farms
- Preston Howe Farm
- Aigle Gill Farm

== Cumberland dialect ==
Farrall also wrote many poems and tales in the Cumbrian dialect, which were first published in the West Cumberland Times and the Whitehaven News. He was the author of the famous Betty Wilson’s Cummerland Teals, a volume published in excess of thirty editions. Other contributions regularly appeared in many of the local newspapers, under a variety of pen names, including, ‘Bachelor Joe’, ‘Recollections of Aunt Sarah’, ‘Tom o’ t’ Nulk’, and ‘Wise Wiff’. His contemporaries considered him a ‘Keen observer of men and things’. In the course of his life he accumulated an inexhaustible stock of anecdotes and when added to his remarkable memory, made him a popular character at social events. He was President of the Aspatria RUFC and a patron of the Aspatria Cycling Club. He died on 19 August 1894 and his remains lie in Aspatria churchyard.

== Bibliography ==
- Thomas Farrall (1892). Betty Wilson's Cummerland Teals. Carlisle: J. C. Mason.
- Thomas Farrall (1877). On the Agriculture of the Counties of Edinburgh and Linlithgow, and the Industrial Progress and Development of these Counties During Recent Years. Edinburgh: Transactions of the Highland and Agricultural Society of Scotland.
