= Beacon Hill Community School =

Location
- Market Square; Aspatria; Cumbria, CA7 3EZ; England
- Coordinates: 54.7642°N 3.3337°W

Information
- Type: Community school
- Local authority: Cumberland Council
- Department for Education URN: 112375 Tables
- Ofsted: Reports
- Executive Headteacher: Judith Schafer
- Gender: Coeducational
- Age: 11 to 16
- Enrolment: 126
- Website: http://beaconhill.cumbria.sch.uk/

Beacon Hill Community School is a coeducational secondary school located in Aspatria is the English county of Cumbria.

It is a community school administered by Cumberland Council, and is the feeder school for Oughterside Primary School and Richmond Hill School in Aspatria, Blennerhasset School in Blennerhasset, St Michael's CE Primary School in Bothel, Plumbland CE School in Parsonby and St Matthew's CE School in Westnewton.

Beacon Hill Community School offers GCSEs and BTECs as programmes of study for pupils. The school shares a governing body with Solway Community School as part of the Cumbria Futures Federation.

The school also has a relationship with Aspatria Hornets Rugby Club, with the school using the clubs facilities.
