= Henry Thompson (veterinary surgeon) =

English veterinarian and agriculturist (1836–1920)

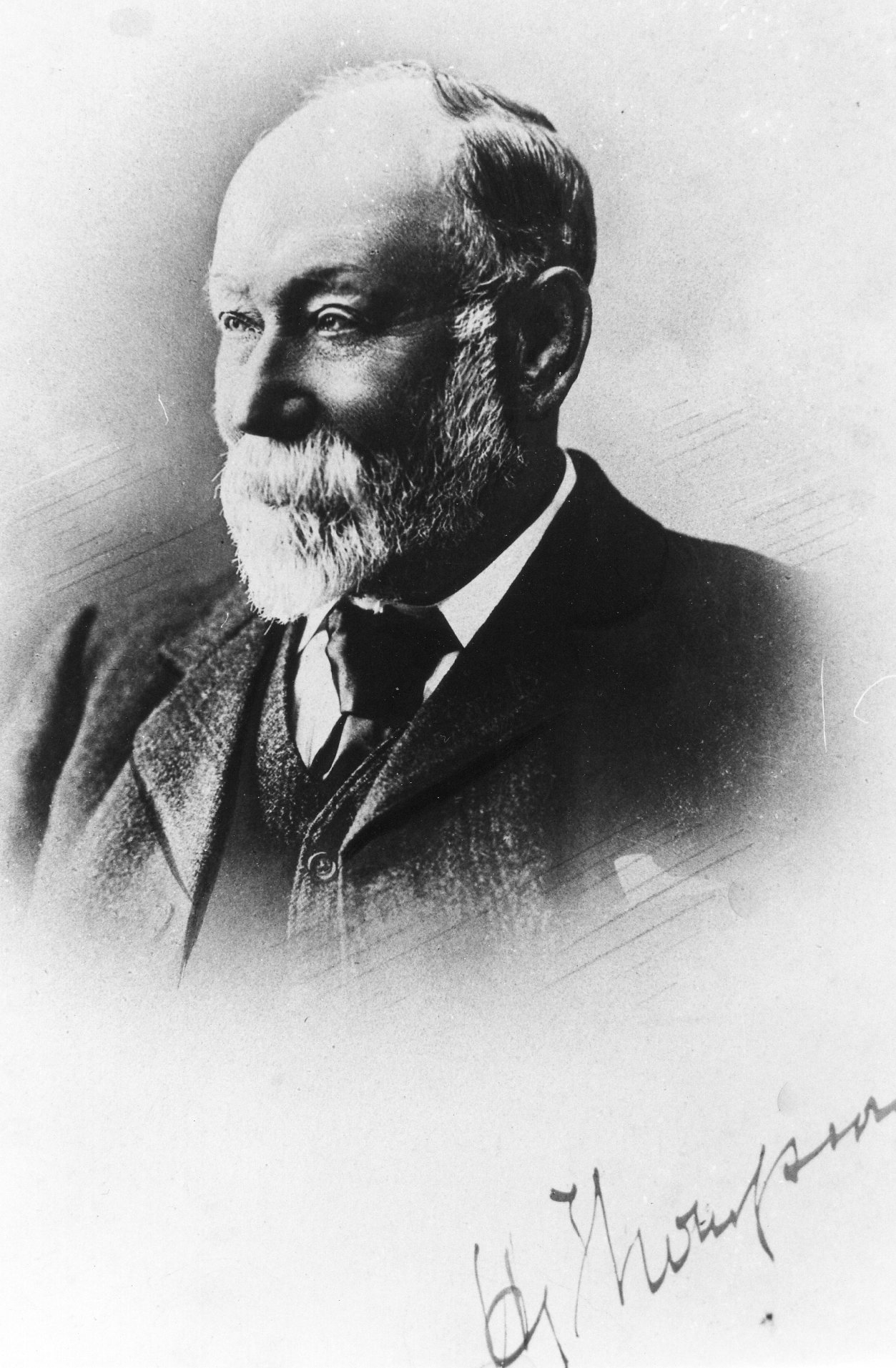
Henry Thompson, author and vetinerary surgeon

Henry Thompson (MRCVS) (Member of the Royal College of Veterinary Surgeons; 1836–1920) was a founder member of the Aspatria Agricultural Society, the Aspatria Agricultural Cooperative Society and the Aspatria Agricultural College.

== Early life and education ==
Henry Thompson was born at Allonby, Cumberland, on 9 September 1836, the youngest of seven children, his father a poor country tailor, earned 9s (45p) per week. At the age of thirteen Thompson became apprentice to Joseph Slee, a Maryport druggist, working from four in the morning to nine in the evening. He later moved to Whitehaven to learn veterinary practice under John Fisher, the most qualified veterinary surgeon in Cumberland. After a further two years learning the basic practical skills associated with the equerry business at Carlisle, he enrolled at the Edinburgh Veterinary College, where he studied under Professor William Dick (1793–1866), the founder of the Royal (Dick) School of Veterinary Studies. After five years of intensive study he graduated with several coveted qualifications; the Diploma of the Highland and Agricultural Society, the examination of the Royal College of Veterinary Surgeons, and the Royal Diploma. He became one of only two veterinary surgeons in Cumberland, to hold both Diploma's by examination. He obtained many academic distinctions including two silver medals for Anatomy and Physiology, and both first and second class certificates for Chemistry, Histology and Pathology.

== Agricultural progress ==
On 4 June 1860, he arrived at Aspatria with 'half-a-crown' (12.5p) in his pocket to take up the position of junior partner in the towns veterinary practice. He befriended Sir Wilfrid Lawson, 2nd Baronet of Brayton and together they became two of the prominent members of the Wigton, and later Aspatria Farmers Club. In 1869, along with William Norman and John Twentyman, the 'dauntless three' as they became known, he organised the annual Aspatria Agricultural Show. In the following year the trio founded the Aspatria Agricultural Cooperative Society and in 1874 they established the Aspatria Agricultural and Commercial School, later renamed the Aspatria Agricultural College. In 1893, after the sale of the Agricultural School the outgoing directors and shareholders acknowledged his many hours of unpaid tuition with the presentation of a piano, and a gold watch.

== Professional triumphs ==
He had many professional triumphs. He was one of the first to experiment with salt as a dressing on the land as a means of destroying insect pests. During his experiments he also discovered that salt acted as a deterrent to other parasitic and microbial diseases, such as 'red water' in cattle. He also anticipated the cure of milk fever in cattle, a discovery later attributed to the Danish biologist Karl Schmidt. In 1895 he enjoyed a degree of success in the treatment of foot and mouth, having seen many cases of the disease, and noted the heavy loss of cattle particularly when calving. As a writer he was an authority on veterinary and agricultural matters. For over forty years he edited the periodical, North British Agriculturist. His book, Elementary Veterinary Science for Agricultural Students, Farmers, and Stock-Keepers, remains an authoritative text book 120 years after its first publication (1895) and is available in paperback form today. It went into seven editions, and was translated and referred to by all sides in the Great War. 'Greens' encyclopaedia (the leading authority of the day), contained thirty-six articles appearing under his name.

== Civic responsibilities ==
There were many examples of his civic work. He was a member of the Aspatria Urban District Council, the Wigton Board of Guardians; a Director of the West Cumberland Dairy Company, and the Aspatria Gas Works. He was president of the Aspatria RUFC, a trustee of the Aspatria National Schools; a founder member of the Aspatria Volunteer Fire Brigade. He was also a collector of public subscriptions initiated to erect the districts first footpaths. He was secretary of the Aspatria Agricultural College, the Cumberland Steam Ploughing Society and the Aspatria Model Building Society. He was also a member of the Council of Veterinary Associations, and the secretary to the Aspatria Agricultural Cooperative Society, for over fifty years. He was also an authority on the Cumbrian dialect.

== Public recognition ==
Harry Thompson preached the gospel of cooperation at every available opportunity and never tired of demonstrating its value to farmers. He succeeded in combating their apathy and their individuality, and worked for the society with a singleness and purpose that no monetary value ever did or could compensate. After the death of the 'Grand Old Man of Cumberland Farming' the following tribute appeared in the pages of Wheatsheaf magazine:

"There is no name more honourable in the records of agricultural co-operation than that of Henry Thompson of Aspatria Cumberland. Although a visionary surgeon and a leading authority on the pathology of animals for sixty years he found time not only to act as secretary of the Aspatria Agricultural Society, but also to champion the cause with his pen."

== Bibliography ==
- Henry Thompson MRCVS (1840). Elementary Veterinary Science For Agricultural Students, Farmers And Stock-Keepers. London.
