= High Blaithwaite railway station =

Disused railway station in Cumbria, England

High Blaithwaite

General information
- Location: High Blaithwaite, near Wigton, Cumberland; England
- Coordinates: 54.7872°N 3.2073°W
- Grid reference: NY224442
- Platforms: 1

Other information
- Status: Disused

History
- Pre-grouping: Maryport and Carlisle Railway

Key dates
- 1866: Line opened through the future station site
- by November 1878: Station opened for passenger traffic
- 1 August 1921: Closed completely
Location

High Blaithwaite railway station was in the former county of Cumberland, now Cumbria, England. It was a stop on the Bolton Loop (sometimes referred to as the "Mealsgate Loop") of the Maryport and Carlisle Railway.

The station served the hamlet of the same name.

== History ==
The line and station were opened by the Maryport and Carlisle Railway primarily to access collieries in the Bolton Coalfield and to head off rival attempts to access this potential traffic by the North British Railway-backed Silloth Company. The line became part of the London, Midland and Scottish Railway (LMSR) at the Grouping of 1923. The station was closed to passenger and parcels traffic in 1921.

== Passenger services ==
Services to the wooden, one coach length High Blaithwaite varied over its existence, but were never lavish. Although there were continuous rails throughout the "loop" from Aspatria to Wigton, most traffic ran as if there was a gap at Mealsgate, i.e. running eastwards from Aspatria to Mealsgate or westwards from Wigton to Mealsgate. There were some through trains, but most goods and passenger trains ran as if there was a gap. In fact there was a gap from 1869 to 1872 when a section of line was lifted east of Mealsgate.

No mention of any Sunday service appears in the literature.

The passenger service of two weekday trains each way between Mealsgate and Aspatria, calling at Baggrow, began on Boxing Day 1866, and appeared in Bradshaw from January 1867, under the heading "Bolton Branch". The journey time from Mealsgate to Aspatria was fifteen minutes. With minor timing changes this remained the service until 1876.

In 1877 an extra train was added on Friday afternoons.

Although in existence as a goods line, the eastern portion of the loop had no passenger services during this period.

From November 1878 timetables were re-titled "Bolton Loop" and the service was enhanced:

- on Mondays, Tuesdays and Saturdays the first train to Aspatria started from High Blaithwaite
- the Fridays Only train ran through to High Blaithwaite, and
- on Tuesdays and Saturdays an extra train ran from Aspatria to Wigton and return, calling at Baggrow, Mealsgate and High Blaithwaite.

August 1887 appeared to be the line's passenger high water mark. All trains called at all intermediate stations, with

- a basic service of three trains between Mealsgate and Aspatria, Monday to Saturday
- the first train to Aspatria on Monday and Saturday started from High Blaithwaite
- an extra train ran between Aspatria and Mealsgate on Tuesdays and Fridays
- Monday, Tuesday and Saturday the 16:20 from Aspatria ran through to High Blaithwaite
- except on Tuesdays, a train ran through from Aspatria to Wigton and back
- on Tuesdays only the first morning train from Aspatria ran through to Wigton, returning later in the morning

By 1912 no through trains ran over the loop between Aspatria and Wigton. On weekdays:

- five plied between Mealsgate and Aspatria
- one of these - the 16:45 from Aspatria - ran through to High Blaithwaite on Mondays, Tuesdays and Saturdays
- at 08:50 a train ran east from Mealsgate to Wigton, returning at 09:55, taking 16 minutes

High Blaithwaite closed in 1921, though a weekday train from Mealsgate to Wigton and back continued to run, passing through the station site. There were six trains a day between Aspatria and Mealsgate.

In at least 1922 and 1923 and "probably until 1928" an unadvertised workmen's service was provided to Allhallows Colliery, between Baggrow and Mealsgate. Whether this was an additional stop for existing trains or additional trains has yet to be confirmed, as have the service's start and end dates. The stopping place at the colliery never achieved advertised public passenger service status.

Apart from the colliers' service, by July 1922 the public passenger service (under the heading "Aspatria and Wigton") had evolved to a simple six trains a day - the "Baggra Bus" - plying between Aspatria and Mealsgate, all calling at Baggrow, with no variations by day. Wigton appears in the table, but no passenger trains served it by this route.

Passenger trains along the remaining, western, part of the loop were withdrawn in 1930, with no residual parcels service. Baggrow was closed completely, but Mealsgate remained open for goods; this petered out in 1952, after which the tracks were lifted east of Baggrow. A section west of Baggrow survived for several more years as a long siding.

== Goods services ==
Two sidings led off the through line, one served a Coal drop with a weighbridge, the other cattle pens.

== Afterlife ==
In 2008 no trace of the station building survived, though parts of the trackbed could readily be seen on satellite images online.

Preceding station	Historical railways	Following station
Mealsgate; Line and station closed	Maryport and Carlisle Railway; Bolton Loop	Brookfield (Cumbria); Line and station closed

== See also ==
- Maryport & Carlisle Railway
