= Allhallows Colliery railway station =

Disused railway station in Cumbria, England

Allhallows Colliery

General information
- Location: West of Mealsgate, Cumberland; England
- Coordinates: 54.7702°N 3.2424°W
- Grid reference: NY201424
- Platforms: 1 (probably)

Other information
- Status: Disused

History
- Pre-grouping: Maryport and Carlisle Railway
- Post-grouping: London Midland and Scottish Railway

Key dates
- by May 1922: Station opened for untimetabled colliers' trains
- Probably 1928 maybe earlier: Station closed
Location

Allhallows Colliery railway station was in the former county of Cumberland, now Cumbria, England. It was a stop on the Bolton Loop (sometimes referred to as the "Mealsgate Loop") of the Maryport and Carlisle Railway.

The station - almost certainly an unstaffed halt - was provided for miners at the colliery of the same name. No timetabled service ever called, nor is it certain what form the platform took, many such up and down the country were primitive in the extreme; in some cases users had to climb down from covered wagons or ancient coaches onto the trackside.

== History ==
The line was opened by the Maryport and Carlisle Railway primarily to access collieries in the Bolton Coalfield and to head off rival attempts to access this potential traffic by the North British Railway-backed Silloth Company. The line and station became part of the London, Midland and Scottish Railway (LMSR) at the Grouping of 1923.

Public stations on the line past the colliery outlived the pit, which closed in 1928.

In 1922 and "probably until 1928" an unadvertised workmen's service was provided to Allhallows Colliery, between Baggrow and Mealsgate. Whether this was an additional stop for existing trains or additional trains has yet to be confirmed, as have the service's start and end dates. The stopping place at the colliery never achieved advertised public passenger service status.

Apart from the colliers' service, by July 1922 the public passenger service past the colliery (under the heading "Aspatria and Wigton") had evolved to a simple six trains a day - the "Baggra Bus" - plying between Aspatria and Mealsgate, all calling at Baggrow, with no variations by day. Wigton appears in the table, but no trains served it by this route.

Passenger trains along the remaining part of the loop were withdrawn in 1930, with no residual parcels service. Baggrow was closed completely, but Mealsgate remained open for goods; this petered out in 1952, after which the tracks were lifted east of Baggrow. A section west of Baggrow survived for several more years as a long siding.

== Afterlife ==
By 2013 all colliery buildings had long been demolished, but the footprint of the colliery site was plain to see on satellite images. Remarkably, the original Allhallows Colliery signalbox has been restored.

| Preceding station | Historical railways | Following station |
|---|---|---|
| Baggrow; Line and station closed | Maryport and Carlisle Railway; Bolton Loop | Mealsgate; Line and station closed |

== See also ==
- Maryport & Carlisle Railway
