= Harbybrow =

Hamlet in Cumbria, England

Coordinates: 54.762°N 3.256°W

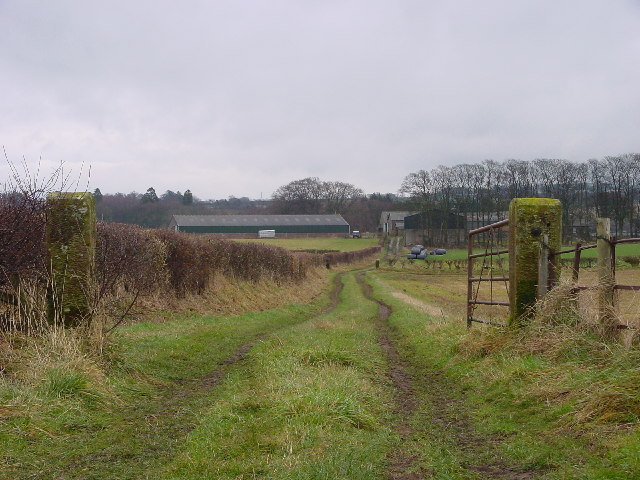
- Track to Harbybrow

- Location in Allerdale, Cumbria Location within Cumbria
- OS grid reference: NY191415
- Civil parish: Allhallows
- Unitary authority: Cumberland
- Ceremonial county: Cumbria
- Region: North West
- Country: England
- Sovereign state: United Kingdom
- Post town: WIGTON
- Postcode district: CA7
- Dialling code: 016973
- Police: Cumbria
- Fire: Cumbria
- Ambulance: North West
- UK Parliament: Penrith and Solway

Harbybrow also spelled as Harby Brow, is a small settlement in the parish of Allhallows, Cumbria, England. Consisting of two inhabited dwellings, the old manor house and nearby mill, it is the smallest hamlet in the parish. In recent years, the mill has been restored by its current owners.

== History ==
The manor house at Harbybrow is connected with its peel tower date back to the 15th century, reflecting the defensive strategies used along the Anglo-Scottish border. Harbybrow Tower was built in the 15th century by Alexander Highmoor, and the property was associated with the Highmore family of Armathwaite in the 15th and 16th centuries. These towers were used to protect both people and livestock from border reivers during the medieval period. Harbybrow was held by the Highmore family and later passed through several hands including the Charlton and Morewood families. Today, John Morewood owns the Morewood Mill.

== Architecture ==
The peel tower rises four storeys high and is built of red and yellow sandstone, featuring narrow defensive windows and barrel-vaulted lower chambers. Adjoining the tower are a farmhouse and barn dating from the early 19th century. These buildings exemplify the evolution of rural architecture in Cumbria, transitioning from defensive structures to agricultural and residential uses.

== Geography ==
Harbybrow is located in a landscape of gently rolling farmland, low hills, streams, and small woodland patches. It is part of the historic county of Cumberland, within the Allhallows parish. Nearby settlements include Mealsgate and Wigton, and the hamlet’s rural setting is characteristic of northern England’s small medieval farming communities.

== Heritage status ==
The peel tower and its associated farmhouse and barn are recognised as Grade I listed buildings on the National Heritage List for England. This designation highlights their architectural and historical significance, marking them as among the most important preserved structures in Cumbria from the medieval and early modern periods.

== Nearby archaeology ==
Approximately 300 m south‑west of Harbybrow are the buried remains of a Roman fort known as Blennerhasset Roman fort. This late first‑century fort is one of the larger known Roman military sites in Cumbria and would have played a role in controlling movement across the Cumbrian plain during the early Roman occupation of north‑west England.
