= Listed buildings in Allhallows, Cumbria =

Allhallows is a civil parish in the Cumberland district in Cumbria, England. It contains six buildings that are recorded in the National Heritage List for England as designated listed buildings. Of these, two are listed at Grade I, the highest of the three grades, and the others are at Grade II, the lowest grade. The parish contains the village of Mealsgate and smaller settlements, and is otherwise rural. The listed buildings consist of two tower houses and the former coach house of one of them, two churches, one redundant, one active, and a war memorial.

== Key ==
Grade	Criteria
I	Buildings of exceptional interest, sometimes considered to be internationally important
II	Buildings of national importance and special interest

== Buildings ==
Name and location	Photograph	Date	Notes	Grade
Church of All Saints; 54.76518°N 3.23902°W		12th century	The church is redundant. The southeast chapel was built in 1587, and rebuilt as a mausoleum in 1862. The church is built in limestone and sandstone rubble, and the roof is of green slate. The nave is in ruins, but the chancel and chapel still stand. The chancel arch is in Norman style, but is now blocked.	II
Harby Brow Tower, farmhouse and barn 54.76198°N 3.25680°W	—	15th century	The tower is the oldest part of the structure, the farmhouse and barn dating from the 19th century, and all are in sandstone. The tower has four storeys, with a plinth and quoins, but is without its roof and floors. It does contain a vaulted basement, doorways, windows, staircases, fireplaces, and garderobes, and at the top is an embattled parapet. The house and barn have a slate roof. The house is in two storeys and three bays, and the barn is to the left. The house has a porch with a coped gables and a ball finial, and contains sash windows. In the barn are doorways and ventilation slits. The tower is also a Scheduled Monument.	I
Whitehall; 54.76296°N 3.24220°W	—	15th century (probable)	A tower house that was converted into a private house in 1862 by Anthony Salvin. It is in red sandstone and calciferous sandstone with a green slate roof, and consists of a tower with three storeys and two bays, and a hall range to the right with two storeys and three bays. The tower has quoins, an angle turret, and an embattled parapet, and the hall range has coped gables and ball finials. The windows have Tudor arched heads.	I
The Coach House; 54.76326°N 3.24184°W	—	1861	Formerly the coach house and stables for Whitehall, converted in 1984 into a restaurant. It was designed by Anthony Salvin and is built in sandstone with a green slate roof, and has two storeys. The main block has four bays with a three-storey clock tower with a pyramidal roof, and a single-bay extension at right angles on the right. The central bay projects forwards, it is gabled, and has a first-floor doorway reached by external stone steps. The left bay is also gabled, and this bay and the extension each contain two round-arched coach doorways. The extension also has a loft door and a gabled dormer.	II
Church of Allhallows; 54.77116°N 3.24929°W		1896–99	The church, designed by C. J. Ferguson, is in red sandstone with roofs of green slate. It consists of a west tower incorporating a porch, a nave, a lower chancel, and a north vestry. The tower is in two stages, and has a south door and a solid parapet. There is a stair turret to the south with two gables. The windows are lancets, and at the east end are triple lancets. On the gables are finials.	II
Mealsgate War Memorial; 54.77100°N 3.24929°W		1920	The war memorial is in the churchyard of the Church of Allhallows, and is in granite. It has a flat tapering column on a square base carrying a Maltese cross inscribed with a Celtic pattern in relief. There is an inscription on the base, and the names of those who fell in the Second World War are on another face. The names of those who were lost in the First World War are on the column.	II
