= Marion Greenstone =

American artist (1925–2005)

- Born: Marion Isaacson; 1925; New York City, U.S.
- Died: November 21, 2005 (aged 79–80)
- Education: Brooklyn College (BA); Columbia University (MA); Art Students League of New York
- Occupation: Artist
- Style: Abstract expressionism; pop art
- Spouse: Myron Greenstone

Marion Greenstone (1925 – November 21, 2005) was an American artist who lived and worked in Canada for several years.

She was born Marion Isaacson in New York City and received a BA from Brooklyn College and a MA from Columbia University. Greenstone continued her studies with painting classes at the Art Students League of New York, the Cummington School of Art Summer School in Massachusetts and the Cooper Union School of Art. In 1954, she received a Fulbright grant to study in Italy. She moved to London, Ontario when her husband took a job there in 1957. In 1960, she became a member of the Ontario Society of Artists. That same year, Greenstone exhibited at the Montreal Museum of Fine Arts, where she was awarded the Jessie Dow Prize. In 1961, she received the Baxter Foundation Award in Toronto. She had several solo exhibitions at several private Toronto galleries. Greenstone moved back to New York City in 1961 but continued to exhibit work in Toronto. Her work was also shown at the Whitney Museum of American Art and the Brooklyn Museum. For a time, she taught at the Pratt Institute.

Greenstone began painting as an abstract expressionist but later became part of the Pop art movement. She continued to paint until the late 1990s.

She married Dr. Myron Greenstone.

Greenstone died in 2005 after suffering from ovarian and lung cancer.

Her work was included in the 2011 Venice Biennale.
