= A. J. Casson Award =

- Description: Award for outstanding achievement in watercolour painting
- Country: Canada
- Presented by: Canadian Society of Painters in Water Colour (CSPWC)

The A. J. Casson Award is given to an artist whose work is considered the best submission to the annual "Open Water" competition organized by the Canadian Society of Painters in Water Colour (CSPWC). It is named after Alfred Joseph Casson (1898–1992), painter. and a member of Canada's "Group of Seven". It is officially given "for outstanding achievement in watercolour painting" and is considered Canada's most significant award in this most challenging medium.

== Background and administration ==
"Open Water" is as implied open to any artist working in watercolour. The juried exhibitions have over the years been held in a number of notable exhibition venues including The National Gallery of Canada (Ottawa, Ontario), The Art Gallery of Ontario (Toronto, Ontario), The Beaverbrook Art Gallery (Fredericton, New Brunswick), The University of Alberta [Edmonton], The Art Gallery of Nova Scotia (Halifax), The Art Gallery of Greater Victoria (British Columbia), The Peel Art Gallery, Museum and Archives (Brampton, Ontario) and the John B. Aird Gallery (Toronto, Ontario).

The competition has attracted a series of jurors and entries from not only Canada but from many other countries.

The award consists of a bronze medal created by Dora de Pedéry-Hunt which carries an image inspired by one of Casson's most iconic landscapes. The naming of the award in honour of a beloved CSPWC member and the longest surviving founder of the Society was approved by Casson himself shortly before his death. He was actively involved in the selection of the image and in approving the first sculpted maquette.

Accompanied by a cash award the medal was first presented in 1991 when it replaced the CSPWC's Honour Award, a diploma, which had been presented annually from 1956 onwards to the "outstanding watercolour of the year". During a transition period 1991 to 1997 the medal was accompanied by the Honour Award diploma but the latter was phased out in 1998.

== Winners ==
1956-1990	Honour Award Recipients	1991-2011	A. J. Casson Award Winners
1956	Tom Hodgson	1991	Michael Dobson
1957	Maxwell Bates	1992	Sam Black
1958	Ethel Raicus	1993	June Selznick Drutz
1959	Marion Greenstone	1994	John Inglis
1960	William Roberts	1995	Neville Clarke
1961	Bobs Cogill Haworth	1996	Anthony J. Batten
1962	Peter Kolisnyk	1997	June Selznick Drutz
1963	Herbert Ariss	1998	David Ladmore
1964	Goodridge Roberts	1999	Neville Clarke
1965	Ray Cattell	2000	Daniel Barkley
1966	D. Mackay Houston	2001	Marilyn Blumer Cochrane
1967	John Henry Martin	2002	Vivian Thierfelder
1968	Bobs Cogill Haworth	2003	Chow Jian Sheng
1969	Harriet Manore Carter	2004	Karen Wilson
1970	Eric Freifeld	2005	David McEown
1971	Ray Cattell	2006	Jennifer Annesley
1972	Tom Lapierre	2007	Joanne Lucas Warren
1973	John Newman	2008	Linda Kemp
1974	Dainis Miezajs	2009	William Rogers
1975	Ray Cattell	2010	Josy Britton
1976	June Selznick Drutz	2011	Pat Fairhead
1977	Les Tait	2012	Daniel Barkley
1978	recipient unknown	2013	Andrew Kish III
1979	Janet Mitchell	2014	Lisa O'Regan
1980	Tom Lapierre	2015	Jansen Chow
1981	Osvald Timmas	2016	Fan Zhang
1982	Sam Black	2017	Inge Kjeldgaard Tajik
1983	Dainis Miezajs	2018	David McEown
1984	Ann MacIntosh Duff	2019	Fucai Zhao
1985	Sam Black	2020	Karen Mai
1986	Bobs Cogill Haworth	2021	Richard Tiejun Chao
1987	Vivian Thierfelder	2022	Marie-Françoise Ingels
1988	Pat Clemes	2023	Karen Mai
1989	June Selznick Drutz	2024	Richard Tiejun Chao
1990	Susan Leopold		
