= Henry Casson (cricketer) =

English cricketer

Personal information
- Born: 15 March 1830; Manchester, Lancashire
- Died: 25 October 1902 (aged 72); South Kensington, London

Domestic team information
- Years: Team
- 1850-1852: Cambridge UCC

Henry Casson (15 March 1830 – 25 October 1902) was an English barrister and cricketer.

Casson was the son of William Casson, a Manchester solicitor, and was born there in 1830. He was educated at St John's College, Cambridge, and played five first-class matches for Cambridge University Cricket Club between 1850 and 1852. After graduating, he was called to the Bar at Inner Temple in 1856.

Among his father's clerks in Manchester had been Charles Hall, who later became Vice-Chancellor of England. Casson trained as an equity lawyer under Hall, and later married his daughter. He undertook a great deal of conveyancing work for his father-in-law, and when in 1878 Hall became Vice Chancellor, Casson succeeded him as conveyancing counsel to the Court of Chancery. He was also conveyancing counsel to the Metropolitan Board of Works and from its creation in 1889 to the London County Council, and was adviser of the Ecclesiastical Commissioners in their church building cases.

Casson married first a daughter of Sir Charles Hall, and secondly in 1877 a daughter of Lieutenant-Colonel Scott, of Newport, Isle of Wight. He died from heart failure in London on 25 October 1902.

== See also ==
- List of Cambridge University Cricket Club players
