= Jacob Casson Geiger =

American physician and director of public health in California

Jacob Casson Geiger (18 November 1885 – 7 November 1981) was city director of public health in San Francisco and Oakland, California, and the president of the San Francisco Medical Society in 1935.

Geiger was a native of Alexandria, Rapides Parish, in the U.S. state of Louisiana, and was a graduate of Tulane University. For his research in public health medicine (e.g., malaria and botulism), he received numerous awards from the U.S. and foreign governments as well as several honorary academic degrees. Among others, he was made Officer of the Legion of Honor (France), Commander of the Order of Jade (China), and Commander of the Order of Quissam Aloute Cherifien (Morocco).

== Education ==
Geiger attended Soule College for some time before enrolling at Tulane University in New Orleans. During his time here, Geiger was awarded three degrees:

- Bachelor of Arts in 1905,
- Master of Arts in 1908,
- Doctor of Medicine in 1912.

The honorary degree of Doctor of Public Health was presented to him in 1919.

== Personal life ==
Geiger had two marriages. He was first married to Florence Clay Gourrier Geiger, with whom he had two sons: Dr. James Metz ("Jim") Geiger and John Casson Geiger. She died on October 22, 1918, after contracting the Spanish flu.

In 1923, he married his second wife, Anna Elsie "Anne" Morse Geiger. Together, they had one daughter, Anita Celine Geiger Bordwell. In 1977, Anne died and was buried beside him in her family mausoleum in Oak Grove Cemetery, Bath, Maine.

== Posts and services ==
=== Pre-War ===
In 1911, after receiving his medical diploma, Geiger accepted the offer to teach at the University of California, Berkeley as a professor of bacteriology. During this time, he also took up the post of instructor in the Department of Hygiene; and director of the Bureau of Laboratories of the State Department of Public Health when it was merged with the Bureau of Communicable Diseases. Geiger was then appointed as the active director, then assistant professor, of the Department of Hygiene.

In 1915, Geiger served as an officer in the United States public health service, and was dispatched to the Mexican border at the time of the Mexican Revolution.

In 1916, he was reassigned to the Marine Hospital in New Orleans and was appointed to conduct experimental work for the control of mosquitoes in the rice fields of the world, which led to the awarding of his honorary degree of Doctor of Public Health in 1919.

=== During War ===
During World War 1, Geiger was in charge of the health and hygiene of cantonment at Camp Pike, Little Rock, Arkansas.

In 1918, an influenza pandemic, also known as the Spanish Flu, broke out in Arkansas, infecting thousands of people and killing at least 7,000 by 1919. The military base was the epicenter of the pandemic in Arkansas. Nearly 52,000 troops inhabited the camp, which was almost 90% of Little Rock's population. Camp conditions, such as crowding of troops into close-quarters barracks, fueled the spread of the virus, especially after a quarantine was declared.

Between September and October, Geiger visited the sick, quarantining families and towns, examined over a hundred dining establishments, and consulted with his supervisor in Washington. He frequently advised the public on taking health precautions and urged merchants to phone the police at once if they saw anyone spitting in public.

Geiger caught the flu and by 13 October, he was staying home from work. Although he later recovered, his wife - 32-year-old Florence G. Geiger - however, died after contracting the virus.

=== Post-War ===
In 1919, Geiger was reassigned to the University of California, for the purpose of studying the conditions of the rice fields near Chico, California.

Due to the urgent request of Governor Hiram Johnson of California, Geiger was invited to work with the California Botulism Commission as an epidemiologist to solve the food poisoning cases, caused by B. botulinus, in the state. As a member of the commission, he assisted in producing specific strategies for safely processing olives to prevent such deadly events from happening again. Upon the request of the University of Chicago, he was reposted to their institution to continue the investigation of food poisoning under the direction of Professor Jordan.

From 1922 to 1927, Geiger was assigned as an associate professor, then full professor, in bacteriology at the University of Chicago.

After passing civil service examinations, he also took up the role of Assistant Health Commissioner of Chicago from 1924 until 1927. After having a leave of absence being granted by the Chicago department of public health, he returned to the University of California, where he became an associate professor of the Hooper Foundation for medical research and a clinical professor of epidemiology in the Department of Microbiology of the U. C. Medical School. In 1930, his skills were recognized by promotion to a full professorship.

During the summer of 1931, Geiger was commissioned to study ship ventilation and diseases that might enter the states through the Pacific ports by the US government. As such, he visited China, Korea, Japan, and Siberia in the conduct of these duties.

After returning to the United States in September 1931, he was assigned City Health Officer of San Francisco by the Board of Health and remained on post until 1952, where he was appointed as the Oakload health officer.

In April 1936, Geiger, who represented the Chicago Health Department, attested for the government on the toxicity of lead and arsenic spray residues on fruits and vegetables along with other medical professionals.

In 1955, Geiger retired and served as a consultant to the city in the consolidation of the Oakland Health Department with Alameda County until 1959.

== Membership ==
He is a fellow in the American Medical Association; a member of the American Public Health Association; the Chicago Institute of Medicine; the California State Medical Society; and the San Francisco City and County Medical Society.

== Death ==
On 7 November 1981, he died after being admitted to the hospital Friday night from his home in the Sunset District. His memorial service was held at 2 p.m, on Friday, 13 November 1981 in the chapel of Grace Episcopal Cathedral. His body was cremated and the ashes interred in Oak Grove Cemetery, Bath, Maine. Halsted-N. Gray and Co Mortuaries were responsible for the funeral planning.
