= William Casson =

English botanist (1796–1886)

William Casson (23 October 1796 – 22 January 1886) was an English botanist, seed merchant, and local historian. He discovered the Fen or Crested Buckler-fern Dryopteris cristata in Yorkshire and wrote a local history of Thorne, The History and Antiquities of Thorne, with some account of the drainage of Hatfield Chase (1829, 3rd edition 1874). He also established a large garden on the edge of the Thorne Moors with his brother John in which he bred varieties of rhododendron, sheep laurel, and springbeauty.

William was born in Thorne on 23 October 1796 to Mordecai and Mary Casson. He had two brothers, Mordecai and John Calvert, and one sister, Sarah. After a very basic education at the vicarage school, he was apprenticed to a firm of grocers and later worked in a grocery business in Thorne started by his grandfather. By the mid-1850s, William and his brother John had become successful "seedsmen, grocers, and farmers." They established an important nursery east of Thorne where he transformed the "unproductive moor" into a place for raising a variety of plants for their business (Limbert 1991).

William was an ardent Quaker who was closely involved with Thorne Friends Preparative Meeting as well as a member of Balby Monthly Meeting. In March 1879, he became a minister and visited other meetings throughout Yorkshire, often in the company of a Scarborough Quaker minister, Henry Hopkins.

Throughout his life William showed a deep interest in the district's poor and the inmates of Thorne Union workhouse. He visited the workhouse often and led a religious service on Sunday afternoons for several years. He was also a staunch liberal who occupied several parish offices. He also played a crucial role in the Thorne Literary & Scientific Association. At the end of his life, William suffered an accident to his hip and the loss of an eye, yet continued his rigorous schedule. He died of erysipelas on 22 January 1886 and was buried at the Friends' burial ground off Church Lane in Thorne.
