= Fletchertown =

Village in Cumbria, England

Coordinates: 54.775°N 3.233°W

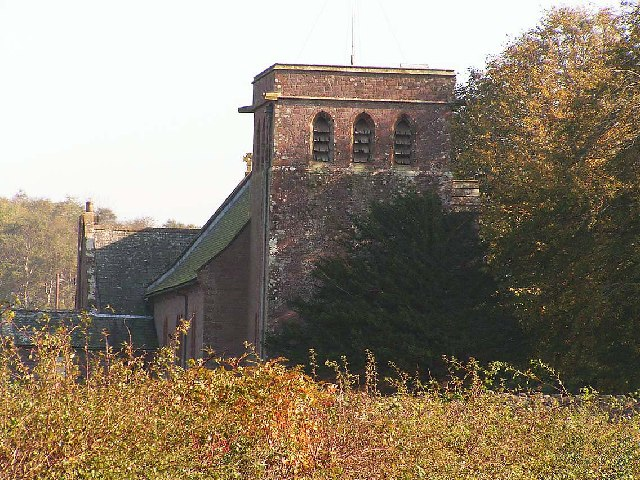
- Allhallows' Church, Fletchertown

- Location in Allerdale Location within Cumbria
- Population: 548 (2001)
- OS grid reference: NY206429
- Civil parish: Allhallows
- Unitary authority: Cumberland
- Ceremonial county: Cumbria
- Region: North West
- Country: England
- Sovereign state: United Kingdom
- Post town: WIGTON
- Postcode district: CA7
- Dialling code: 016973
- Police: Cumbria
- Fire: Cumbria
- Ambulance: North West
- UK Parliament: Penrith and Solway

Fletchertown is a small village in the Cumberland district of Cumbria, England.

The village was originally built to house workers in a nearby coal mine, since abandoned. The site of the mine and its spoil heaps remain. The heaps are known locally as the 'pit bank' area. Fletchertown is also the home of a number of industrial units. The school closed in 1984 and now serves as a local community centre.

== Location ==
Fletchertown is situated 6 mi (10 km) from the market town of Wigton, 16.7 mi (27 km) from the border city of Carlisle, 15.7 mi (25 km) from Keswick and 10.6 mi (17 km) from the town of Cockermouth. Fletchertown is situated about 5 miles north of the northern edge of the Lake District National Park.

== Governance ==
The village is in the parliamentary constituency of Penrith and Solway, Markus Campbell-Savours is the Member of parliament.

For Local Government purposes it is in Aspatria Ward of Cumberland Council.

It was historically within Cumberland. From 1974 to 2023 it was part of the Allerdale borough.

Fletchertown does not have its own parish council, instead it is part of Allhallows Parish Council. The Parish of Allhallows incorporates the three villages of Baggrow, Fletchertown and Watch Hill, together with the area of Mealsgate known as Pine Grove.

== See also ==
- Allhallows, Cumbria
