= Baggrow =

Village in Cumbria, England

Coordinates: 54.75°N 03.29°W

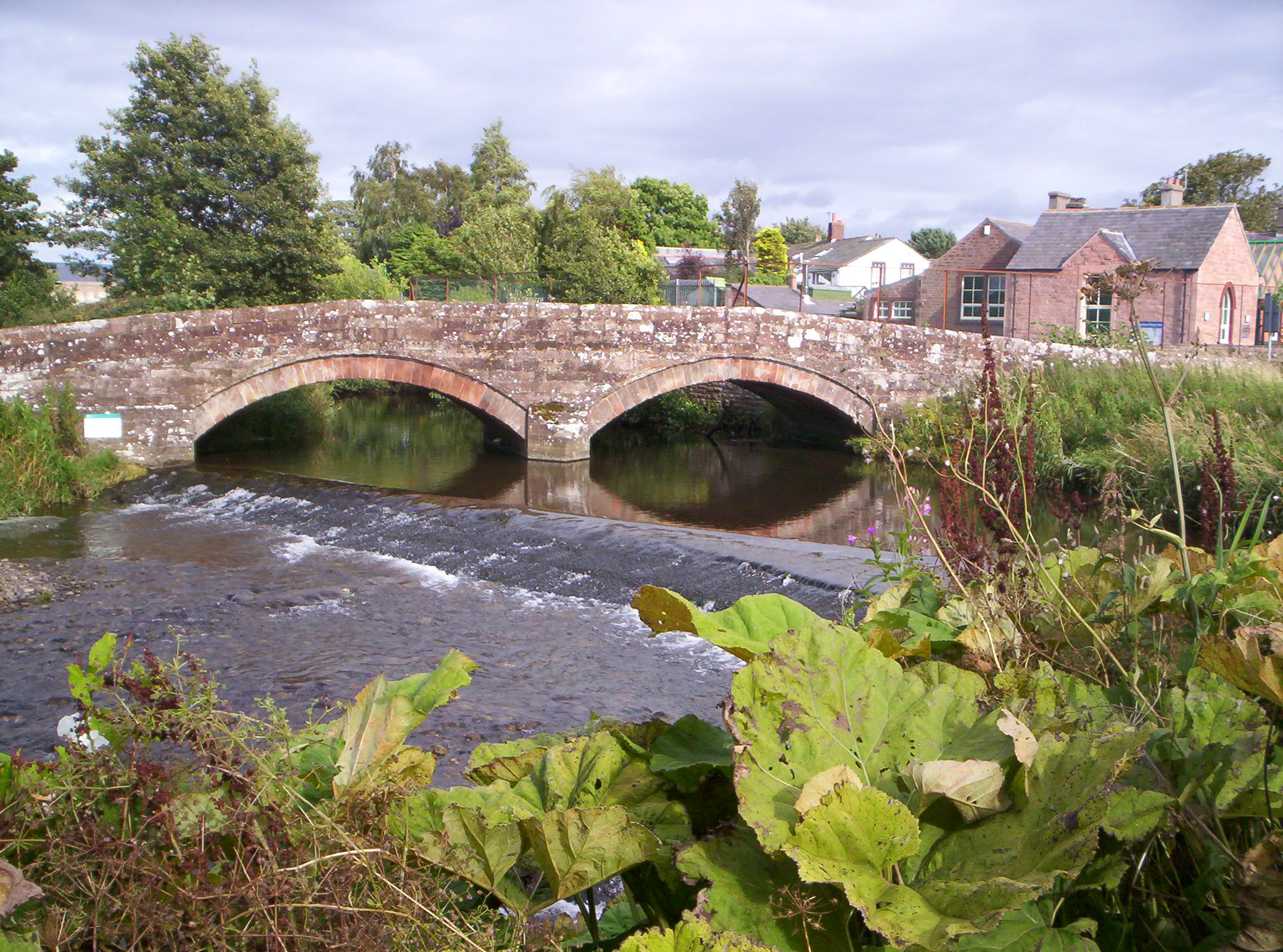
- The bridge over the River Ellen, joining Baggrow with Blennerhasset.

- Location in Allerdale, Cumbria Location within Cumbria
- OS grid reference: NY177419
- Civil parish: Allhallows
- Unitary authority: Cumberland
- Ceremonial county: Cumbria
- Region: North West
- Country: England
- Sovereign state: United Kingdom
- Post town: WIGTON
- Postcode district: CA7
- Dialling code: 016973
- Police: Cumbria
- Fire: Cumbria
- Ambulance: North West
- UK Parliament: Penrith and Solway

Baggrow is a small village situated north of the Lake District National Park in the English county of Cumbria, historically within Cumberland.

In many parts of the village views of England's 4th highest peak Skiddaw, standing 931 metres (3053 ft) above sea level, can be seen to the south east, some 9.5 mi (15 km) away.

== Governance ==
The village is in the parliamentary constituency of Penrith and Solway.

For Local Government purposes it is in the Cumberland unitary authority area.

Baggrow does not have its own parish council, instead it is part of Allhallows Parish Council. The Parish of Allhallows incorporates the three villages of Baggrow, Fletchertown and Watch Hill, together with the area of Mealsgate known as Pine Grove.

== Railway ==
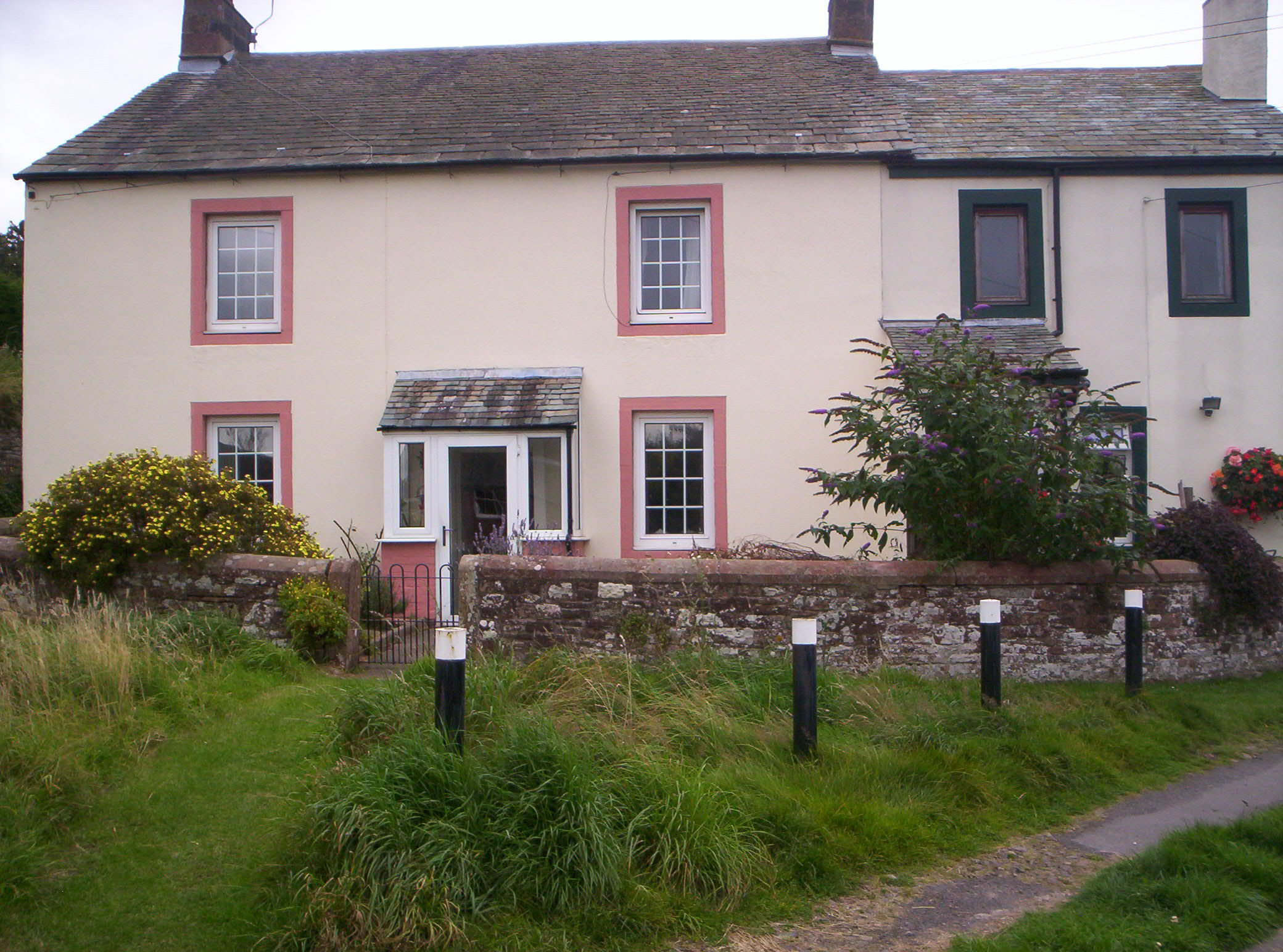
Station Manager's House as it is today

Baggrow railway station was a stop along the Bolton Loop of the Maryport and Carlisle Railway which used to run through the village serving the Brayton Knowle Colliery here, and the mine at nearby Mealsgate. The line has been dismantled but evidence of its existence and its use can be seen along the route.
