= Mealsgate =

Village in Cumbria, England

Coordinates: 54.768°N 3.231°W

- Village
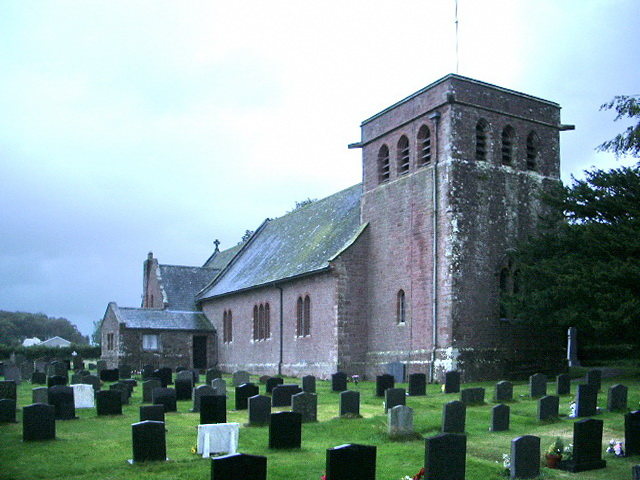
- All Saints' Church, Allhallows, Mealsgate

- Location in the former Allerdale district Location within Cumbria
- OS grid reference: NY208421
- Civil parish: Boltons
- Unitary authority: Cumberland
- Ceremonial county: Cumbria
- Region: North West
- Country: England
- Sovereign state: United Kingdom
- Post town: WIGTON
- Postcode district: CA7
- Dialling code: 01900
- Police: Cumbria
- Fire: Cumbria
- Ambulance: North West
- UK Parliament: Penrith and Solway

Mealsgate is a village in Cumbria, England, historically within Cumberland.

== Location ==
Mealsgate grid reference NY208421 is situated on the old Roman Road between Carlisle and the Roman fort of Derventio at Papcastle NY110315. This road is now known as the A595. Mealsgate is situated 5.6 mi (9 km) from the market town of Wigton, 16.2 mi (26 km) from the border city of Carlisle, 15.1 mi (24 km) from Keswick and 10 mi (16 km) from the town of Cockermouth. Mealsgate is situated on edge of the Lake District National Park.

== Railway Connection ==
Mealsgate was a stop on the Bolton Loop of the Maryport and Carlisle Railway and served the pit at Fletchertown like other stops on the loop.

== Governance ==
The village is in the parliamentary constituency of Penrith and Solway.

For Local Government purposes it is administered as part of the Cumberland unitary authority area.

Mealsgate does not have its own parish council, instead it is part of Allhallows Parish Council. The Parish of Allhallows incorporates the three villages of Baggrow, Fletchertown and Watch Hill, together with the area of Mealsgate known as Pine Grove.

== Landmarks ==
Around 1 mi (2 km) to the south-west is Whitehall, a medieval tower house, restored by Anthony Salvin in the 19th century.

== See also ==
- Listed buildings in Allhallows, Cumbria
