= Netherhall School, Maryport =

Netherhall School

Location
- Netherhall Road; Maryport, Cumbria, CA15 6NT; England; 54.7184°N 3.4854°W

Information
- Type: Community school
- Established: 1955
- Local authority: Cumberland Council
- Department for Education URN: 112382 Tables
- Ofsted: Reports
- Head teacher: David Tromans
- Gender: Mixed
- Age: 11 to 18
- Website: Netherhall School

Netherhall School is a secondary school in Maryport, Cumbria. Built in the 1950s, it has a catchment area that covers Maryport, Allerby, Bullgill, Crosby, Crosby Villa, Dearham, Allonby, Flimby, Broughton Moor and other surrounding villages.

The school has a fitness gym, AstroTurf, and large sports playing fields.

== History ==
Netherhall School is located on a 35-acre site along the River Ellen that had previously formed part of the Netherhall Estate. This estate was for centuries the seat of the local Senhouse family, and of Humphrey Senhouse who built the modern harbour of Maryport and named it after his wife. A medieval pele tower survives as a relic of the mansion, to the southwest of the modern school buildings. It was built with many dressed Roman stones, presumably from Alauna Roman fort nearby.

The first new buildings on the campus were opened as a three form entry boys' school by Charles Morris, Baron Morris of Grasmere, Vice-Chancellor of Leeds University, on 13 June 1955. The adjoining three form entry girls' school opened in September 1959. The schools merged to become a single mixed comprehensive school in 1968.

The school became a Specialist Sports College in September 2003 and a Full Service Extended School in September 2004. The £1.6 million joint-use Community Sports Centre opened in July 2005. The school has also held Investors in People status, and the Artsmark, Sportsmark and Healthy Schools accreditations (National Healthy Schools Programme).

== Curriculum ==
Netherhall offers 11–18 provision. At Key Stage 4 students can choose (alongside the core English, Maths and Science) Design and Technology, Physical Education, ICT, History, Geography, Travel and Tourism, RE, French, Health and Social Care, Childcare, Construction, CoPE, Horticulture, Workskills, Art, and Music.

At Key Stage 5 The sixth form offer a wide range of subjects with the combinations of Maths and Sciences; English and English Literature; Physical Education; the Humanities – Geography, History, Religious Studies; Art, Media and Performing Arts; ICT; French, Travel and Tourism and Health and Social Care. GCSE resits are also offered in English, Maths and Science.

The Sixth Form is housed in its own Centre with ICT and social facilities whilst still retaining links with the school and college through teaching, library and sports facilities.

== Extracurricular activities ==
The school offers a range of extracurricular activities, such as:

- Music and media activities (guitar, drums, choir, music theory & practising other instruments (piano, keyboard)
- Sporting activities (clubs or teams in athletics, basketball, cricket, golf, hockey, netball, gymnastics, orienteering, fell running, football, rugby, tennis, cross country, cheerleading, and others)
- Arts activities (art, drama, music, Drama Club and drama productions, choir and bands; musical tuition; and visits to galleries, concerts and theatre productions)
- Subject-based activities (science, maths, languages, technology, humanities, English, IT, library)
- Council activities (year, school and sports council)
- Games activities (chess etc.)
- Fundraising activities
- Residential activities (field trips, visits to France and, other European trips, work experience, outdoor pursuits)
- Reward activities (cinema trips, ice skating, ten-pin bowling, Wet & Wild etc.)

== Extended school and adult education ==
Netherhall and Beacon Hill school provide a range of courses to the local community.

== Netherhall Community Sports Centre ==
Netherhall Community Sports Centre is part of Netherhall School Specialist Sports College. The facilities within the centre serve both the school itself and the whole of the local community and surrounding district.

== Closure of the swimming pool ==
In October 2018, it was announced that the Netherhall School community swimming pool is to close.

== Notable former pupils ==
- Kyle Dempsey (footballer)
- Simon Lawson (paralympic athlete)
- Ricky Lightfoot (world champion trail runner)
- Glenn Murray (footballer)
- Dan Bewley (speedway rider)
- Taylor Charters (footballer)
