= Listed buildings in Crosscanonby =

Crosscanonby is a civil parish in the Cumberland unitary authority area of Cumbria, England. It contains 16 listed buildings that are recorded in the National Heritage List for England. Of these, one is listed at Grade I, the highest of the three grades, and the others are at Grade II, the lowest grade. The parish contains the villages of Crosscanonby, Crosby and Birkby, and the surrounding countryside. The listed buildings consist of houses and cottages, and associated buildings, a church and a war memorial.

== Key ==
Grade	Criteria
I	Buildings of exceptional interest, sometimes considered to be internationally important
II	Buildings of national importance and special interest

== Buildings ==
Name and location	Photograph	Date	Notes	Grade
St John's Church; 54.73735°N 3.44717°W		12th century	The church was altered during the following centuries, and was restored in 1880 by C. J. Ferguson. It is in Norman style, and is built in sandstone blocks, some of which are Roman stones, and it has a green slate roof with coped gables and cross finials. It consists of a nave, a south aisle with a south porch, a north vestry, and a lower chancel with a south chapel. On the west gable is a bellcote.	I
Crosscanonby Hall; 54.73717°N 3.44756°W	—	Mid 16th century	A farmhouse that was altered and extended in 1857. It is in sandstone, roughcast at the rear, and has a green slate roof with coped gables. There are two storeys, originally with three bays, and with later extensions to the left and to the rear, resulting in an L-shaped plan. The original part has mullioned windows in chamfered surrounds with hood moulds. The windows in the extension are casements. At the rear is a two-storey gabled stair projection with a doorway.	II
Westlands Farmhouse and barn 54.73236°N 3.43996°W	—	1693	The building was altered in 1743. The farmhouse is stuccoed, with angle pilasters and an eaves cornice, and it has a green slate roof with coped gables. There are two storeys and a symmetrical front of five bays. The central doorway has an architrave with a segmental pediment, and the windows are sashes with architraves. The barn to the right is in rubble, partly stuccoed, and has windows, a projecting cart entrance, and a lean-to shippon.	II
Hill Farmhouse; 54.73178°N 3.43897°W	—	1723	A stuccoed farmhouse that has a green slate roof with coped gables. There are two storeys and four bays. The porch has fluted pilasters and a scrolled pediment with a ball finial, and the doorway has an architrave with a dated lintel. The windows are sashes.	II
East Farmhouse; 54.73864°N 3.44456°W	—	Early 18th century	The farmhouse was extended later in the century. It is stuccoed, with quoins, an eaves cornice, and a green slate roof with coped gables. There are two storeys and five bays, with a single-bay extension to the right. The doorway has an architrave with a scrolled pediment, and the windows are sashes in architraves.	II
Sawrey Ground and attached buildings 54.73305°N 3.43753°W	—	1737	A farmhouse that was later extended, and additional buildings were built at the rear. It was once owned by Beatrix Potter, and is in rendered stone with a slate roof. There are two storeys and three bays, and with the buildings at the rear has an approximately L-shaped plan. On the front is a porch with a pitched roof, and the windows are sashes. At the rear are a barn, a former dairy, and a former stable. A number of early internal features have been retained.	II
Birkby Farmhouse; 54.72264°N 3.46177°W	—	1755	A sandstone farmhouse on a chamfered plinth with quoins, an eaves cornice, and a green slate roof with coped gables. There are two storeys and five bays, and the windows are casements with architraves. The round-headed doorway has pilasters, imposts and a false keystone.	II
Birkby Lodge; 54.72868°N 3.45105°W	—	Late 18th or early 19th century	A stuccoed house on a chamfered plinth with a hipped green slate roof. It has two storeys and three bays. On the front is a porch with unfluted Ionic columns and a door with a fanlight. The windows are sashes, those in the ground floor are in round-headed recesses.	II
Milestone; 54.74462°N 3.45425°W	—	Late 18th or early 19th century	The milestone was provided for the Wigton to Workington Turnpike road. It has a rounded top and is inscribed on the front with the distances in miles to Wigton and to Workington.	II
Birkby House and Birkby Cottage; 54.72320°N 3.46214°W	—	Early 19th century	Two adjoining houses, stuccoed on a chamfered plinth, with angle pilasters, eaves cornices, and green slate roofs, and both have two storeys. Birkby House has three bays with a single-bay extension to the left. It has a Doric doorcase and casement windows, and in the extension is a Venetian window. The other house has an Ionic doorcase and sash windows.	II
Wall and gate piers, Birkby House; 54.72344°N 3.46254°W	—	Early 19th century	The wall is in red sandstone with chamfered coping. The gate piers are painted and rusticated, and they are surmounted by ball finials.	II
Ellen Grove; 54.71932°N 3.47846°W	—	Early 19th century	A rendered house on a chamfered plinth, with a string course, angle pilasters, a parapet, and a green slate roof. It has two storeys and four bays. The main doorway has an Ionic porch and a round-headed doorway with a fanlight, and there is another doorway to the left with pilasters and a cornice. The windows are sashes.	II
The Retreat; 54.72402°N 3.46116°W	—	Early 19th century	A stuccoed house with angle pilasters, a stone parapet, and a green slate roof. There are two storeys and five bays, with a lower two-storey, three-bay extension to the right. The central bay of the main block is canted, and it contains double doors, with stone panels and tall two-light windows above. In the other bays are sash windows with chamfered surrounds and hood moulds. In the extension is a door with a fanlight, a garage door and sash windows.	II
Crosscanonby House; 54.73801°N 3.44746°W	—	Mid 19th century	The house is rendered with a stone parapet and a green slate roof. It has two storeys and five bays, with a two-bay extension to the right. The main doorway has a recessed porch with two columns, and above the door is a fanlight. There is another doorway to the right with a plain surround and a fanlight, and this is flanked by canted bay windows. There is another bay window to the left, and above it is an oriel window. In the upper floor are sash windows with pediments.	II
War memorial 54.73739°N 3.44697°W	—	1920	The war memorial is in the churchyard of St John's Church. It is in grey granite, and consists of a wheel-head cross on a tiered moulded foot. This stands on a tall plinth with a cornice and a two-tiered base. Carved on the cross is a diagonally down-pointed sword and a sword belt in relief. On the plinth are inscriptions and the names of those lost in both World Wars.	II
Wall and gate, Hill Farmhouse; 54.73180°N 3.43911°W	—	Undated	The wall is in brick with stone coping, and the square gate piers are stone. Between the piers is a wrought iron gate.	II
