= Crosby Villa =

Village in Cumbria, England

Coordinates: 54.73790°N 3.41125°W

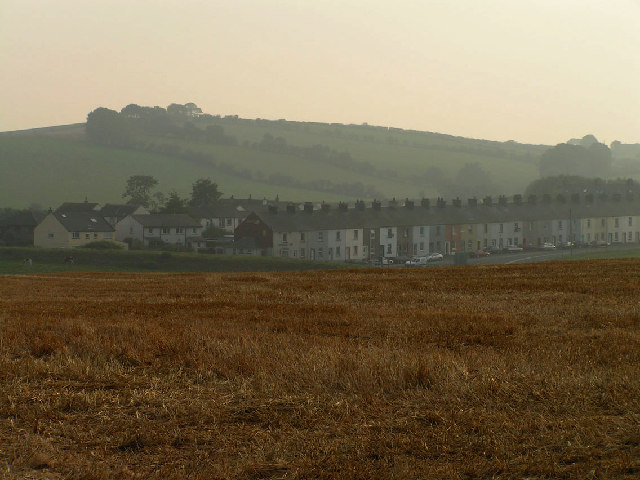
- Crosby Villa from across the fields.

- Location in Allerdale, Cumbria Location within Cumbria
- OS grid reference: NY091390
- Civil parish: Crosscanonby
- Unitary authority: Cumberland
- Ceremonial county: Cumbria
- Region: North West
- Country: England
- Sovereign state: United Kingdom
- Post town: Maryport
- Postcode district: CA15
- Dialling code: 01900
- Police: Cumbria
- Fire: Cumbria
- Ambulance: North West
- UK Parliament: Penrith and Solway

Crosby Villa is a hamlet in the civil parish of Crosscanonby in Cumbria, England. It is located on the A596 road, 3.75 miles (6.04 km) north-east of Maryport and 3.75 miles (6.04 km) south-west of Aspatria. The village of Crosby is 1.5 miles (2.4 km) to the south-west, and the hamlet of Oughterside is 2.25 miles (3.62 km) to the north-east. Cumbria's county town, Carlisle, is 24 miles (39 km) to the north-east.

Crosby Villa lies on the Solway Plain, less than 1 mile (1.6 km) from the boundary of the Solway Coast Area of Outstanding Natural Beauty, and approximately 1.5 miles (2.4 km) s from the shore of Allonby Bay, an inlet of the Solway Firth. Historically, the name may have been spelled Crosby Villas.

== Governance ==
Crosby Villa is in the parliamentary constituency of Penrith and Solway.

For Local Government purposes it is in the Cumberland unitary authority area.

Crosby Villa has its own Parish Council; Crosscanonby Parish Council.

== History ==
During the Roman period, there was a settlement near to the site of modern Crosby Villa called Garborough. The modern village was built to provide housing for miners at Rosegill and Bullgill coal mines during the 19th century. In addition to the seventy terraced houses, a chapel, shops, and a post office were provided, along with allotments for gardening. The chapel was built in 1863. There was no school, however, and the miners' children walked to Crosby to attend the school there. Near to Bullgill coal mine was Bullgill railway station, approximately 0.25 miles (0.40 km) from Crosby Villa, on the Maryport and Carlisle Railway (now a part of the Cumbrian Coast Line). Bullgill pit closed in 1897, and Rosegill a few years later. This began a period of hardship for the village, exacerbated by the General Strike of 1926. Bullgill railway station closed to passengers in 1960, a few years before the Beeching axe. A road haulage firm called Duncan Hill was established in nearby Dearham in 1951, and later relocated to Crosby Villa, from where it continues to operate.
