= Gilcrux =

Village and civil parish in Cumbria, England

Coordinates: 54.730°N 3.375°W

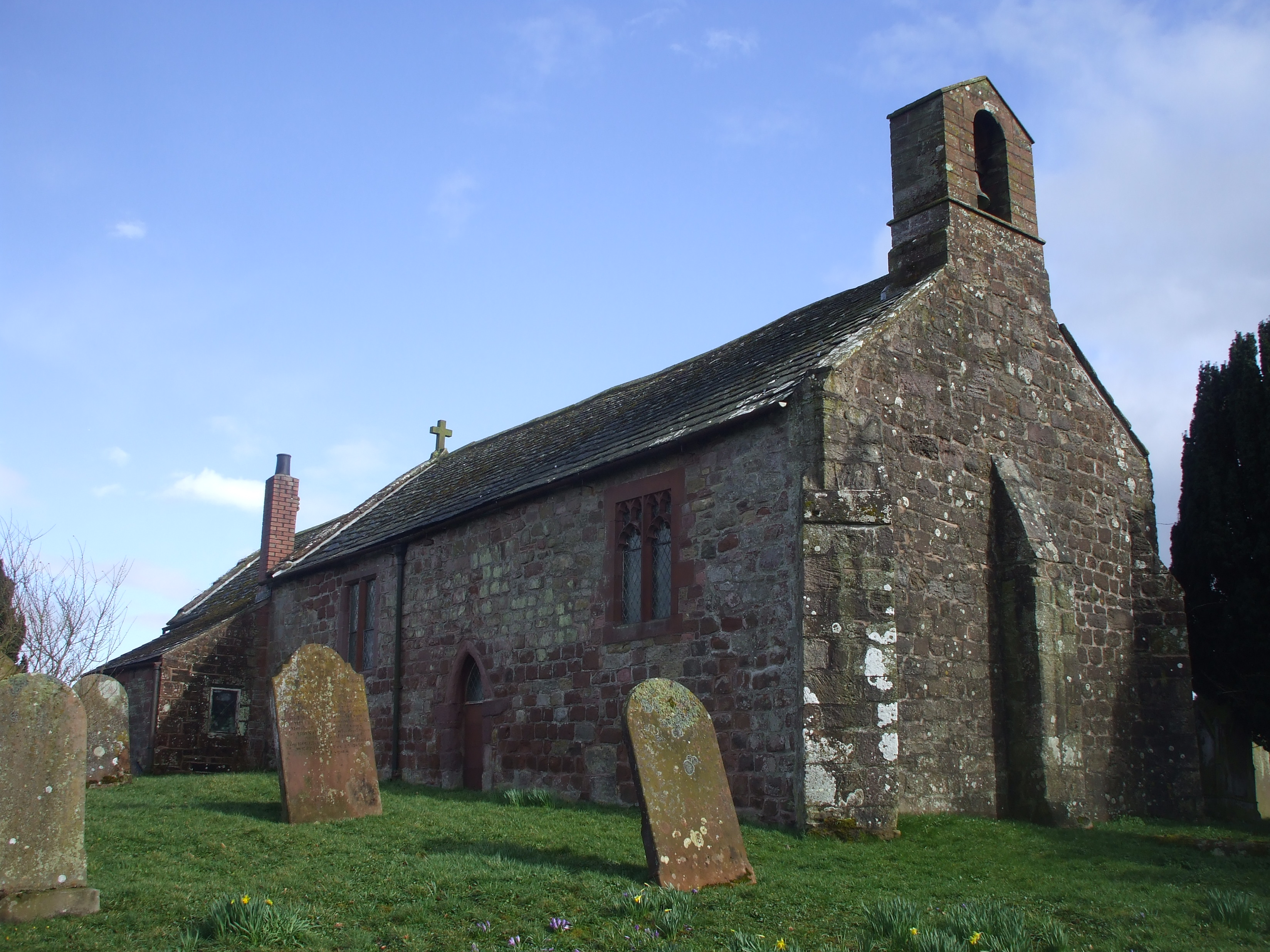
- St. Mary's Church, Gilcrux

- Location in Allerdale, Cumbria Location within Cumbria
- Population: 299 (2011 Census)
- OS grid reference: NY115381
- Civil parish: Gilcrux
- Unitary authority: Cumberland
- Ceremonial county: Cumbria
- Region: North West
- Country: England
- Sovereign state: United Kingdom
- Post town: WIGTON
- Postcode district: CA7
- Dialling code: 01697
- Police: Cumbria
- Fire: Cumbria
- Ambulance: North West
- UK Parliament: Penrith and Solway

Gilcrux is a small village and civil parish in the ceremonial county of Cumbria, England, and historically part of Cumberland. It is situated just outside the Lake District National Park.

The village is on the south bank of the River Ellen around 5 miles (8 km) north of Cockermouth and around 37 kilometres (23 mi) southwest of Carlisle, the county town of Cumbria. An early record of the village is shown on a map of the Cumbria area by Christopher Saxton in 1567, in which the village is known as Gilcrosse.

== Toponymy ==
The name Gilcrux may be derived from the Brittonic elements *cīl meaning "a nook/retreat", and -crṻg meaning "an isolated or abrupt hill", and may have originally meant "hill retreat". Also possible is derivation from Gaelic *cil-cruaich, "a church with a cross". The present form of the name has been influenced by Old Norse gil, "a ravine" and Latin crux, "a cross".

== History ==
Census data shows the changes in the population of the parish over time. Censuses are recorded at 10-year intervals in the United Kingdom with the earliest records for population coming from the 1801 UK census. The graph in Figure 1 shows that the population increased steadily until 1891, after which it decreased slowly to its current figure.

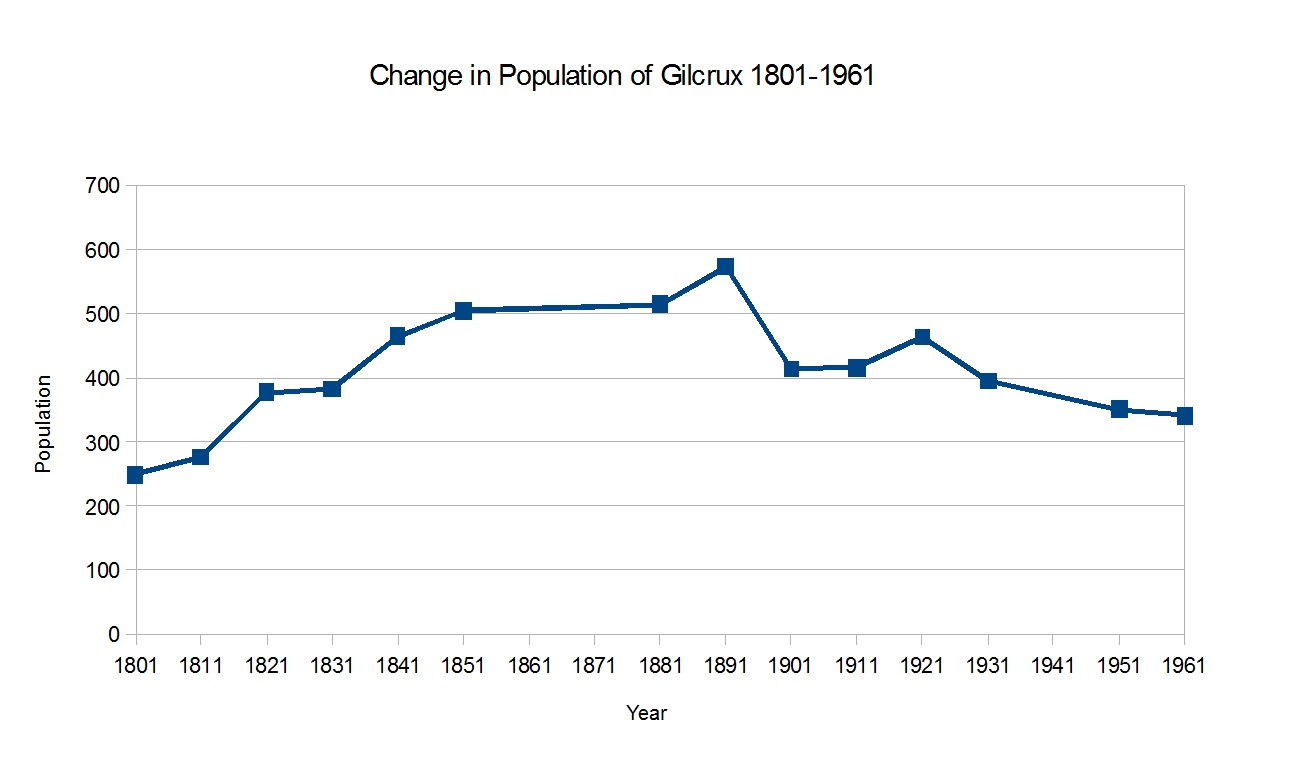
Figure 1 (Population Change)

The increase in population is explained by John Marius Wilson in his Imperial Gazetteer of England and Wales, the increase in residents was due to the extensions of coal mines in the area.

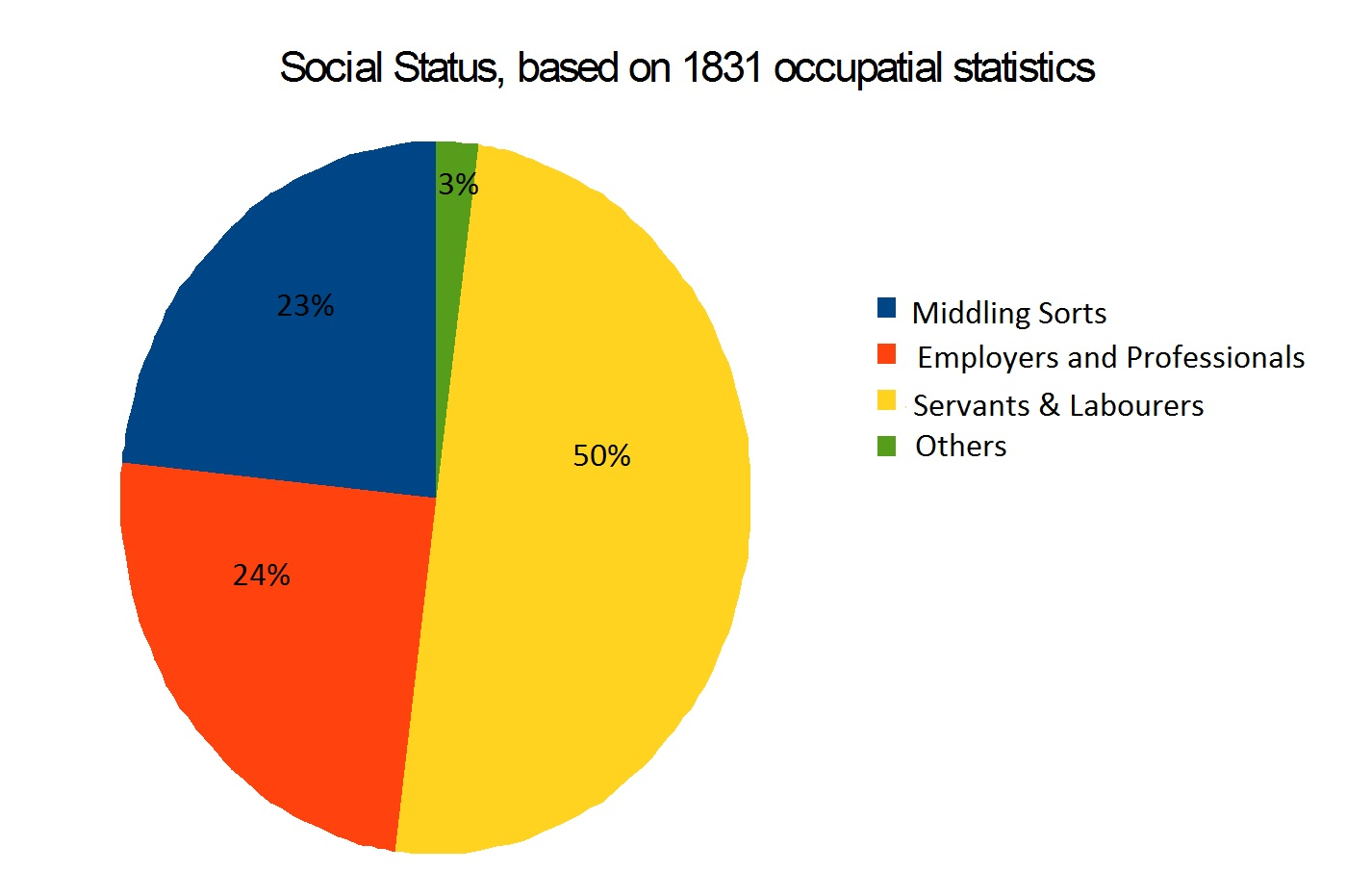
Figure 2: Occupational Structure of Gilcrux, 1831

Census data also reflects the social structure of the parish in 1831. The pie chart in Figure 2 shows the proportion of Gilcrux's workforce in very broad categories. Half of the total population worked as labourers and servants on the parish farms, and were most likely employed by those in the 'Employers and Professionals' group, which make up almost a quarter of the total population.

== Governance ==
Gilcrux is part of the Penrith and Solway constituency of the UK parliament.

For Local Government purposes it is administered as part of the Cumberland unitary authority. Between 1974 and 2023 it was governed by Allerdale Borough Council and Cumbria County Council. Before 1974 it was part of Cockermouth Rural District.

The village also has its own Parish Council together with part of Bullgill; Gilcrux Parish Council.

== Landmarks ==
The village contains St Mary's Church, which sits atop of a mound in the centre of the village. The church dates back to Norman times and was renovated in the late 13th century. The church has an Anglo-Danish Norse cross on its roof, and contains a glass altar screen of Leonardo da Vinci's painting of The Last Supper.

Building work started on the village hall in January 2010, and was completed in March 2012, costing £580,000, much of which came from National Lottery funding. The refurbishments included a glass entrance lobby, more meeting rooms, a bar area and improved toilet facilities.

The village also contains the Beeches Caravan Park; the village’s close proximity to the Lake District make it an attractive location for tourists, with the caravan park being open all year round.

== Transport ==
By road, Gilcrux is close to two major roads, the A596 which is around 2 miles (3.2 km) north of the village, and the A595 which is around 3.7 miles (6.0 km) to the south. These two roads link the village with the town of Carlisle which is around 23 miles (37 km) away.

A bus service is the only form of Public Transport in Gilcrux. The 39 bus is active on Tuesdays and Fridays and completes its route from Bothel to Carlisle once on these days

The nearest train station is Aspatria railway station which is roughly 3.4 miles (5.5 km) away from Gilcrux. The station runs trains everyday northbound towards Carlisle and southbound towards Barrow-in-Furness.

== Demographics ==
According to the United Kingdom Census 2001 the population of the parish was 303, with the parish containing 119 households in total. reducing at the 2011 Census to a population of 299 in 132 households.

There are 145 people between the ages of 16 and 74 that are economically active, with 9 people in that age bracket unemployed and a further 66 economically inactive. Employment within the parish is split between the extractive and manufacturing industries, in which 41% of the population are employed, and the service industry, which employs the remaining 59% of the economically active employed population of Gilcrux. The census data also allows us to see the mean distance that the residents of Gilcrux have to travel to their place of employment, the figure given is 14.55 miles (23.42 km); this could suggest that few people remain in the parish to work and instead commute to large settlements each day for work.

== Climate ==
Climate data for Gilcrux, Cumbria, England
Month	Jan	Feb	Mar	Apr	May	Jun	Jul	Aug	Sep	Oct	Nov	Dec	Year
Mean daily maximum °C (°F)	6 (43)	7 (45)	9 (48)	11 (52)	15 (59)	17 (63)	19 (66)	19 (66)	16 (61)	13 (55)	9 (48)	7 (45)	12 (54)
Mean daily minimum °C (°F)	2 (36)	2 (36)	3 (37)	4 (39)	6 (43)	9 (48)	12 (54)	11 (52)	9 (48)	7 (45)	4 (39)	2 (36)	6 (43)
Average precipitation cm (inches)	9.39 (3.70)	8.09 (3.19)	7.33 (2.89)	5.41 (2.13)	5.62 (2.21)	6.38 (2.51)	6.14 (2.42)	7.15 (2.81)	8.32 (3.28)	11.09 (4.37)	9.85 (3.88)	10.47 (4.12)	95.24 (37.51)
Source: www.bing.com

== Notable people ==
- Dr William Perry Briggs, Medical Officer of Health to Aspatria Urban District Council (1892–1928)

== See also ==
- Listed buildings in Gilcrux
