= Bullgill =

Hamlet in Cumbria, England

Coordinates: 54.733°N 3.406°W

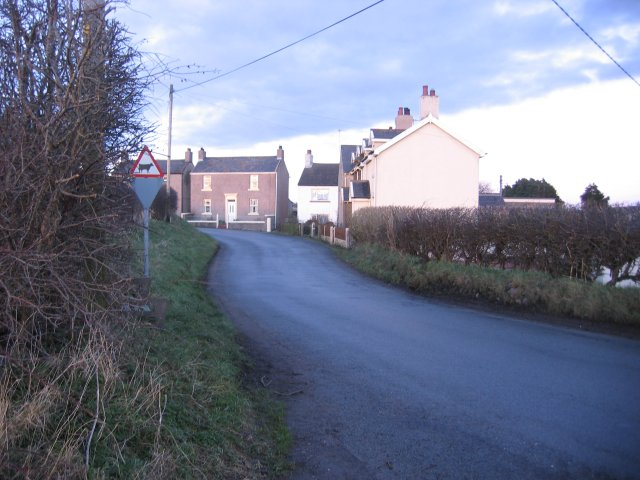
- Bullgill

- Location in Allerdale, Cumbria Location within Cumbria
- OS grid reference: NY094384
- Civil parish: Crosscanonby
- Unitary authority: Cumberland
- Ceremonial county: Cumbria
- Region: North West
- Country: England
- Sovereign state: United Kingdom
- Post town: MARYPORT
- Postcode district: CA15
- Dialling code: 01900
- Police: Cumbria
- Fire: Cumbria
- Ambulance: North West
- UK Parliament: Penrith and Solway

Bullgill is a hamlet in Cumbria, England.

== Geography ==
It is located to the northeast of Dearham, 4.3 miles (6.9 km) by road northeast of Maryport and 0.5 miles (0.80 km) southeast of Crosby Villa. The River Ellen flows nearby.

== History ==
Bullgill was developed as a mining community. The Ellen Pit coal mine was sunk in 1859.

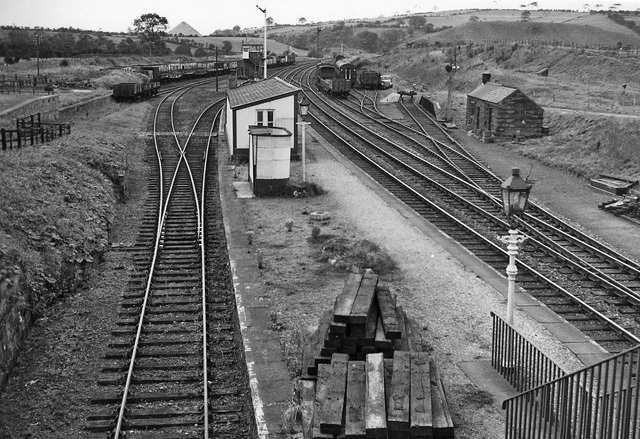
Bullgill railway station

A railway station was formerly located at Bullgill connecting it with Carlisle. It closed to passengers on 7 March 1960.

== Governance ==
Bullgill, is part of the Penrith and Solway constituency of the UK parliament.

For Local Government purposes it is in the Cumberland unitary authority area.

The village also has its own Parish Council; Crosscanonby Parish Council.

== A Poem about Bullgill ==
This poem, attributed to Gordon Nicholl, describes the closure of Bulgill Colliery in about 1910.

Original West-Cumbrian Version:

Bulgill's buggert marra
Wukken out cum's fast
If thou gits t'backshift in
That cud be thee last

T'Powney's gone till Riser
T'Ingins gone till t'seals
Thompson's up afoort t'boss
Fer pinchun six inch neals

Tyson's gone till Buthy
Cass till Outerside
Uncle Joe's at Number Fower
An Tom's at Number Five

Bulgill's buggert marra
Just a wa' o stean
Divent ga 'till Buthy
Thoo's better off at yam.

Ere we ga up t'clog trod
In till t'Railway Pub
Get thee wissel wet me lad
See-un thou'll be on't club.

Translation:

Bulgill Colliery is to close-
The pillars are being robbed-
Another backshift-
And it could be the end.-

The pit Pony has gone to Risehow-
The loco is for sale-
Mr. Thompson is on the carpet-
For stealing six inch nails-

Mr. Tyson is transferreed to Bertha Pit-
Mr. Cass to Outherside Colliery-
Uncle Joseph to Brayton Domain No. 4-
And Tom to Brayton Domain No. 5-

Bullgill Colliery is finished-
We are looking at walls of stone-
For Heaven's sake don't go to Bertha Pit-
You will be better off at home-

Here we go up the path-
Into the Railway Inn-
Have a good drink-
You will soon be on Benefit.-

== See also ==
- List of places in Cumbria
