= Roger Stevens (diplomat) =

British academic, diplomat and civil servant

Sir Roger Bentham Stevens, GCMG (8 June 1906 – 20 February 1980) was a British diplomat and civil servant who later served as Vice-Chancellor of the University of Leeds.

== Early life and education ==
Stevens was born 8 June 1906. He was educated at Wellington College and Queen's College, Oxford.

== Diplomatic career ==
In 1928 Stevens entered the UK Consular Service, serving in Buenos Aires, New York City, Antwerp, Denver, and the Foreign Office in London.

In 1951 he was appointed British Ambassador to Sweden, then in 1954, British Ambassador to Persia. He wrote two books on Persia, The Land of the Great Sophy (1962) and First View of Persia (1964), and continued to contribute to academic journals on the same subject in later life. In 1958 he returned to London as Deputy Under-Secretary of State, Foreign Office, until 1963.

== Later career ==
In 1963 Stevens was appointed Vice-Chancellor of the University of Leeds in succession to Charles Morris, Baron Morris of Grasmere. He remained at Leeds until 1970 when he was in turn succeeded by Edward Boyle, Baron Boyle of Handsworth.

Stevens additionally served as:

- Advisor to First Secretary of State on Central Africa, 1963–1970
- Chairman of Yorkshire and Humberside Economic Planning Council, 1965–1970,
- Member of the Panel of Inquiry into Greater London Development Plan, 1970–1972,
- Chairman of the Committee on Mineral Planning Control, 1972–1974,
- Member of the United Nations Administrative Tribunal (UNAT), 1972–1977.

== Honours ==
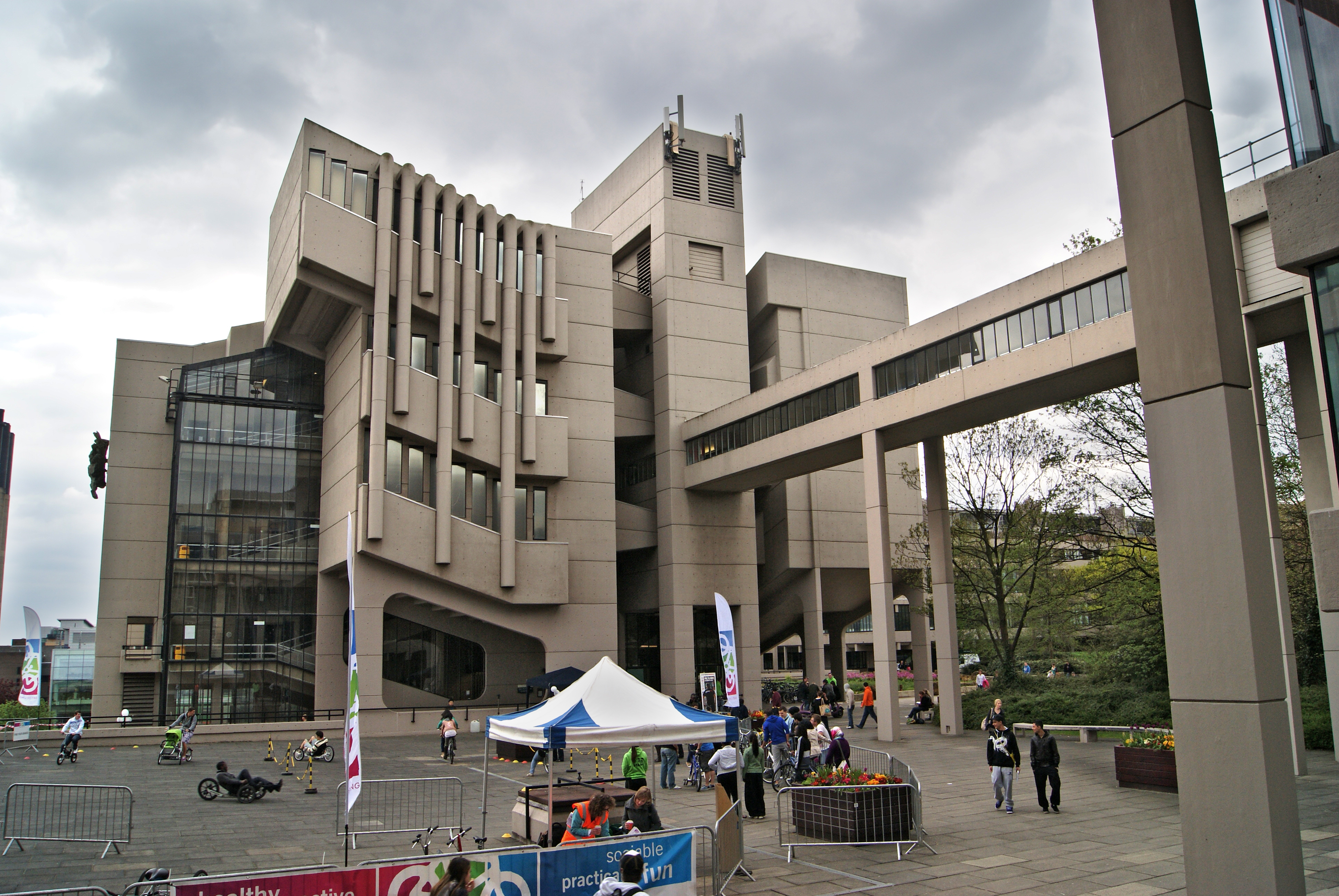
The Roger Stevens building at the University of Leeds.

Stevens was appointed a Companion of the Order of St Michael and St George (CMG) in the 1947 Birthday Honours in recognition of his services as Head of the British Secretariat in Washington. He was promoted to Knight Commander of the Order (KCMG) in 1954, and then to Knight Grand Cross (GCMG) in the 1964 Birthday Honours. He is commemorated in the Roger Stevens Building on the campus of the University of Leeds.

== Marriages and children ==
Stevens was married to Constance Hallam Hipwell (died 1976) in 1931 and they later had a son, Bryan Constant Sebastian Bentham Stevens. His second wife was Jane Chandler (née Irving) whom he married in 1977.

== Death ==
Stevens died on 20 February 1980 at the age of 73. His papers were deposited with the Churchill Archives at the University of Cambridge in 1984.

Academic offices
Preceded by Charles Morris	Vice-Chancellor, University of Leeds; 1963–1970	Succeeded by Edward Boyle
