= Milefortlet 21 =

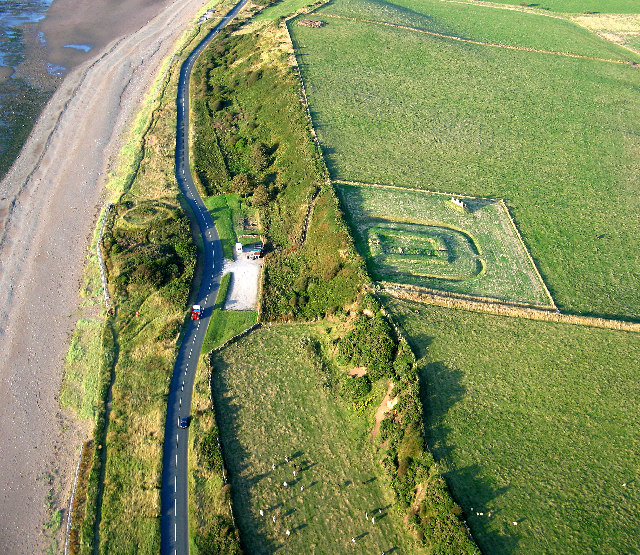
- Milefortlet 21, with the post-medieval Allonby Saltpans on the seaward side

- Location within Cumbria
- 54.746648°N 3.450398°W
- Type: Milecastle
- Location: Cumbria, England

Milefortlet 21 (Swarthy Hill) was a Milefortlet of the Roman Cumbrian Coast defences. These defences were contemporary with defensive structures on Hadrian's Wall. Its remains exist as reconstructed turf ramparts (to a height of about 1 metre (3.3 ft)) and ditch, reinstated to its original profile (also around 1 metre (3.3 ft)). They are located on a low cliff on the coast, north of the village of Crosscanonby, and just inland from the coastal road. It is the only milefortlet to have been fully excavated and is open to the public.

== Construction ==
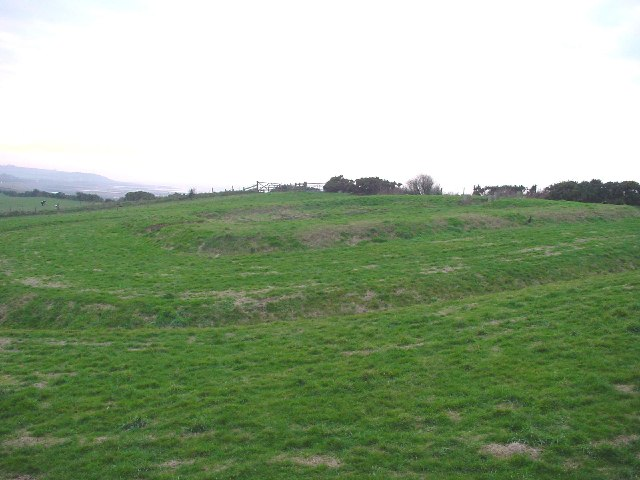
The reconstructed ditch and rampart

Milefortlet 21 was a long-axis milefortlet, constructed with 6 metres (20 ft) wide turf ramparts and timber gates. The ramparts were constructed from turf facings revetting a sand core, giving internal dimensions of 14.5 metres (48 ft) by 18 metres (59 ft).

The internal dimensions of the seaward gateway was 3 metres (9.8 ft) square, formed of four posts. Internal to the milefortlet was a road (no evidence of which was found outside the ramparts). To the south-west of the road there were three buildings; all apparently built on sleeper walls and of similar size, but not of the same layout. The seaward two shared a common wall, and the third was free standing. The most seaward contained a hearth, and the central building contained a furnace or oven. To the north-east of the road stood a single building, taking up most of the area, and having dimensions 18 metres (59 ft) by 5 metres (16 ft). The building was apparently divided into four, with the central bays each containing a hearth, and the outer bays each containing an oven.

The milefortlet was surrounded by a ditch on all but the seaward side. The ditch was broken by a causeway at the opposite end.

== Excavations and investigations ==
=== 1968 ===
In 1968 aerial photographs revealed the cropmarks of the milefortlet's ditch. This was 70 yards (64 m) north-east of its predicted site.

=== 1990-1991 ===
In 1990-1991 a full excavation took place. Finds included: black burnished and grey ware (including cooking vessels); Samian ware; part of a bead; a gaming board; a knife; and an unidentified object that was probably an adze. The pottery finds were consistent with a single period of occupation (Hadrianic).

== Associated Towers ==
Each milefortlet had two associated towers, similar in construction to the turrets built along Hadrian's Wall. These towers were positioned approximately one-third and two-thirds of a Roman mile to the west of the Milefortlet, and would probably have been manned by part of the nearest Milefortlet's garrison. The towers associated with Milefortlet 21 are known as Tower 21A and Tower 21B.

=== Tower 21A ===
Tower 21A (Saltpans) (Location: 54.739903°N 3.460486°W) was located south of the junction of the B5300 and Crosscanonby Road. Nothing remains of the tower, though the dismantling of the remains just before World War II was witnessed by a sandpit worker, who described them as similar to Tower 15A.

=== Tower 21B ===
Tower 21B (Brownrigg North) (Location: 54.738918°N 3.460218°W) was located on the seaward slope of Brown Rigg hill, and consists of the buried remains around two courses high in a normal configuration. Nothing is visible above ground, but crop marks appear on aerial photographs.). The tower first appeared on an RAF aerial photograph in 1946, and was investigated by RL Bellhouse in 1962. Bellhouse subsequently excavated in 1966 and established the height and configuration.

== Monument Records ==
Monument	Monument Number	English Heritage Archive Number
Milefortlet 21	1030618	NY 04 SE 22
Tower 21A	8975	NY 03 NE 9
Tower 21B	8978	NY 03 NE 12

== Public access ==
The previous access point (from the small car park immediately below the milefortlet) was closed in 2009 or 2010. The site can be accessed via an unmarked but good path. The path begins at a field gate just north-east of the B5300's junction with Crosscanonby Lane. Parking is available a few metres along Crosscanonby Lane.
