= Crosscanonby =

Village and civil parish in Cumbria, England

Coordinates: 54.73616°N 3.44424°W

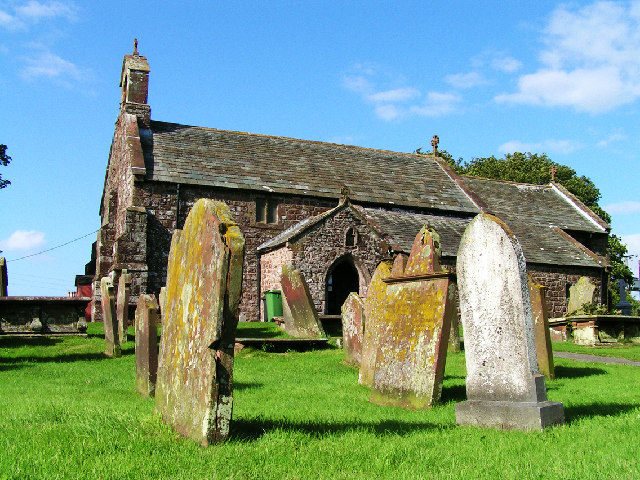
- St John the Evangelist's Church, Crosscanonby

- Location in Allerdale, Cumbria Location within Cumbria
- Population: 1,054 (2001)
- OS grid reference: NY0690139075
  - London: 259 miles (417 km) SE
- Civil parish: Crosscanonby
- Unitary authority: Cumberland
- Ceremonial county: Cumbria
- Region: North West
- Country: England
- Sovereign state: United Kingdom
- Post town: Maryport
- Postcode district: CA15
- Dialling code: 01900
- Police: Cumbria
- Fire: Cumbria
- Ambulance: North West
- UK Parliament: Penrith and Solway

Crosscanonby (otherwise Cross Canonby) is a village and civil parish in Cumbria, England, historically part of Cumberland, near the Lake District National Park in England. It is situated within the Solway Coast, designated an Area of Outstanding Natural Beauty.

The civil parish includes the larger village of Crosby and the hamlets of Birkby and Crosby Villa. The population of the parish was 1,054 in 2001, increasing to 1,113 at the 2011 Census. The parish is served by one public house, the Stag Inn, and a primary school (both in Crosby).

== Toponymy ==
The earliest form of the name was 'Crosseby' (1123–50), from the Old Norse "'krossa býr' meaning 'bȳ (village, hamlet) marked by crosses'. The name 'Crosscanonby' results from the gift of land in Crosby with the church to the canons of Carlisle."

== Location ==
Crosscanonby is located less than 1 mile (1.6 km) from Cumbria's West Coast, 0.5 miles off the A5996 and North of the River Ellen. It is close to the southern end of Allonby Bay, an inlet of the Solway Firth. It is where the Norman church, St John the Evangelist's Church, Crosscanonby is situated, along with the Crosscanonby Carr. North of the village is where the Crosscanonby salt pans are found. Being known for its history as the location where salt was produced from the 1630s until about 1760, it is thought that some of the worker's cottages were constructed in this village at the same time. These cottages became a pub, then reverted to being cottages again in 1900. The coast road, B5300, which runs between the salt pans and the former cottages, was built in 1824.

Crosscanonby is 23 miles (37.0 km) southwest of Carlisle, 8.8 miles (14.2 km) south of Silloth and less than 2 miles (3.2 km) northeast of Maryport.

== Governance ==
Crosscanonby is in the parliamentary constituency of Penrith and Solway, formerly Workington until 2024.

For Local Government purposes it is in the Cumberland unitary authority area.

Crosscanonby has its own Parish Council; Crosscanonby Parish Council.

== Crosscanonby Parish church ==
Crosscanonby church, a grade I listed building, is known as St John the Evangelist's Church, Crosscanonby. It occupies one of the earliest Christian sites in Cumbria. The church was built in c1130 A.D. and has been extensively restored since 1880. The southwest view includes a Viking era gravestone in the lower centre to the church wall. Some of the stonework in the original construction is believed to have come from earlier Roman settlement in the Crosscanonby area. Outside the church is the tomb of local salt tax officer John Smith, who died in 1730. The tomb has an unusual panel showing the salt officer working at his desk.

== Crosscanonby Carr ==
This is a nature reserve, the first in the Solway Plain AONB. It first began as a Solway Plain Rural Initiative Project, which evolved from a vandalised site. Crosscanonby Carr now provides a wetland, meadow and woodland refuge for numerous animals, birds and plants. The site has an Access for All Trail provided for people with all disabilities.

== Education ==
The parish has one local Primary School, Crosscanonby St John's Church of England School, located in the Village of Crosby. The primary school has approximately 66 students aged 4–11 on role.

== History ==
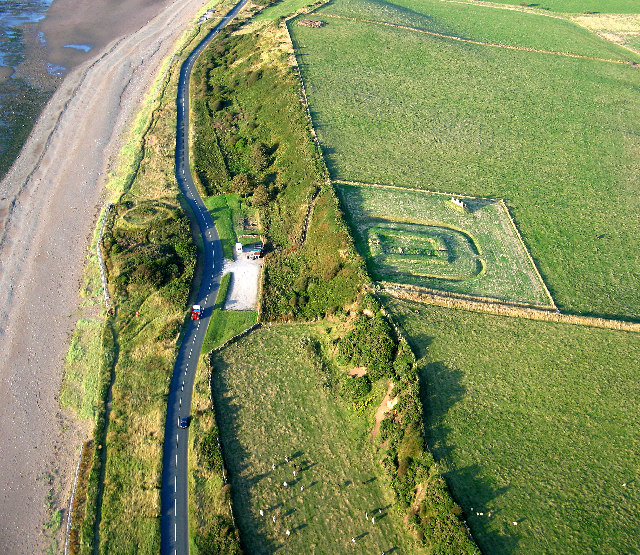
The Roman Milefortlet 21 north of Crosscanonby.

North of the village, along the coast, is the Roman Milefortlet 21 and the Elizabethan salt pans. Milefortlet 21, now part of the Hadrian's Wall World Heritage Site, is believed to date back to between 79 AD and circa 130 AD, revealing a wealth of information about the lifestyle of Roman troops in Britain. Milefortlet 21 was part of a system of defence, including Hadrian's Wall, developed to protect this far-flung corner of the Roman Empire. Another fortlet, Milefortlet 22, is west of the village, but it now lies underneath Maryport Golf Course.

Close to Milefortlet 21 are the remains of the Elizabethan salt pans. It is thought that they were begun around 1630 and leased to Richard Barwise in 1634. On the beach was a water tank on a wooden scaffold, whose footings remain, from which sea water ran onto the Sleech in the Kinch. Sleech is the sand from the beach; the Kinch where it was piled up is the large pond, sealed by puddled clay. The remains of these salt pans can be clearly seen to date. The strong brine from the Kinch trickled down to the south. The brine was then boiled in iron pans to produce salt, which crystallised out of the brine.

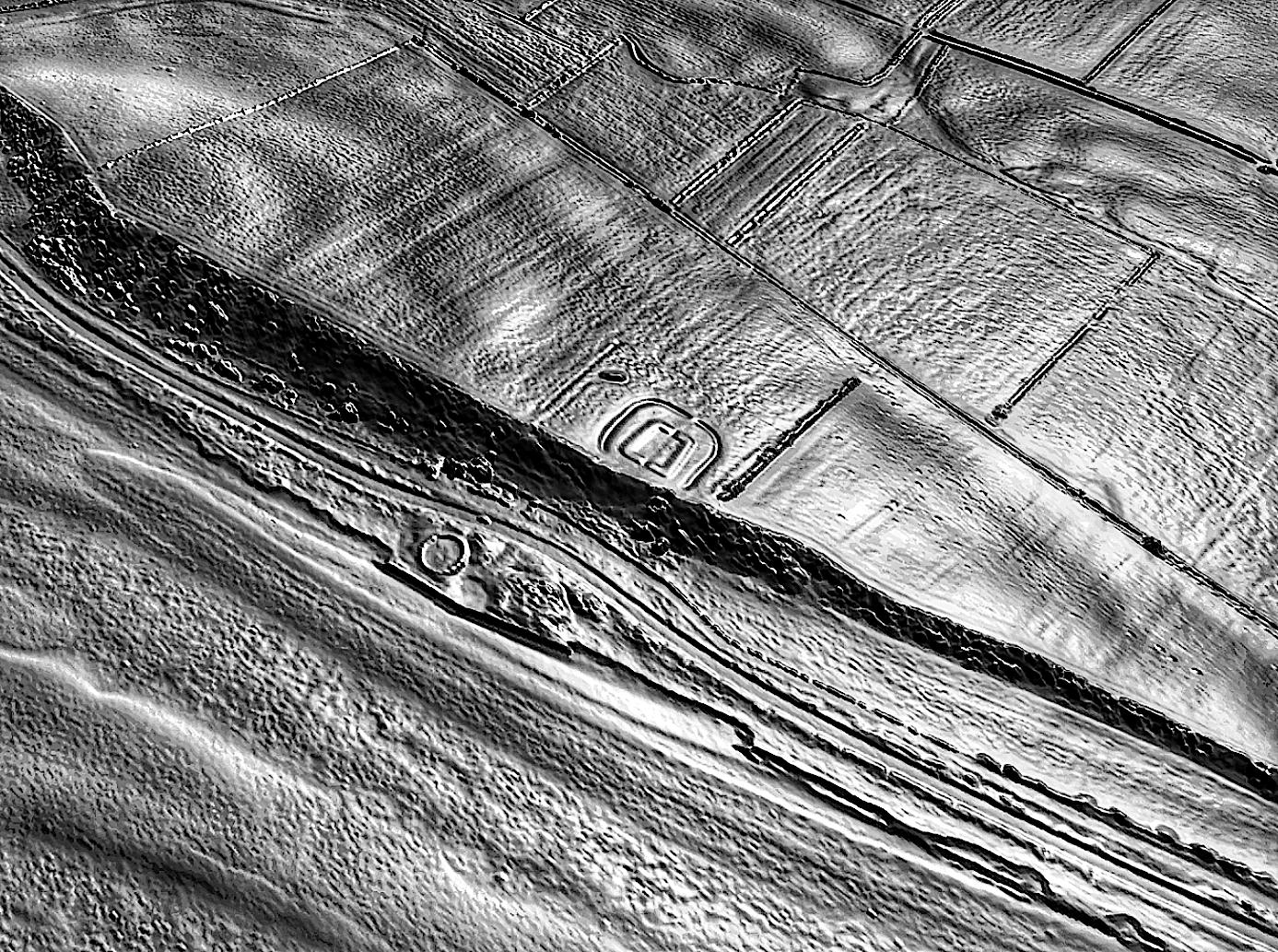
A lidar view of the saltpans and Milefortlet 21.

From 1698 a salt tax was levied. One salt tax Officer was John Smith, (died in 1730), whose tombstone is at St John the Evangelist's Church, Crosscanonby, with a carving of him at his desk.

After being abandoned for salt production, the salt pans suddenly had a new use in the 20th century between 1918 and the 1930s, when holiday cottages and a caravan site grew around them. These pans were seen as a tourist attraction up until when the caravan site was abandoned in the 1970s as a result of coastal erosion. Later in the mid-1980s, the significance of the Salt pans was realised leading to the redevelopment of the historical monument after some research had been carried out. Between 1997 and 1998, Major works were carried out to protect the Salt pans at Crosscanonby from threat of Coastal erosion by the Solway Rural Initiative, having realised that one or two more tides could result in the loss of the Salt pans forever. To protect the Salt pans, emergency work which included building a wooden palisade around the most affected site was carried out. Over 2,000 tonnes of material from nearby Crosscanonby Carr nature reserve were used in the process. Today, the site remains intact, although under constant threat from the tides.

== Demography ==
Population: 1801–2001

Historical population
Year	Pop.	±%
1801	3,252	—
1811	3,479	+7.0%
1821	3,870	+11.2%
1831	4,243	+9.6%
1841	5,731	+35.1%
1851	6,182	+7.9%
1881	8,296	+34.2%
1891	9,196	+10.8%
1901	931	−89.9%
1911	758	−18.6%
1921	927	+22.3%
1931	862	−7.0%
1951	862	+0.0%
1961	941	+9.2%
2001	1,054	+12.0%

The earliest census available for the Crosscanonby area is that of 1801. As the Table below on the right shows, the total population back then was 3252. This then increased exponentially over the next Census reports carried out every ten years until up to 1851 where it had almost doubled to 6,182. The 1891 census report shows the total population reaching its peak at 9,196. However, ten years later the population seems to have dropped significantly to 931 people. Comparing census reports from this period, the population of Crosscanonby has fluctuated leaving the population at 1,054 in 2001.

Total Number of Houses: 1841–2001
The same trend seen in the population of the parish from the 1800s epitomises the change in the total number of houses. A total of 1,372 houses were recorded in the 1841 for the entire parish. Just like the population did, the number of houses increased in the next couple of years with a total count of 1,915 in 1891. Likewise, The number of houses suddenly fell to 229 in the 1901 census report. This number also fluctuated to the total 439 houses in the 2001 census report.

Most Common Occupations: 1881
The 1881 Occupation Census report shows that the most common occupations for men were Works in Dress employing 118 people, Works in Food and Lodging (123), Works in House Furniture and Decorations (245), Works in Mineral Substances (408) and Works in Transport and Communications (423). 269 men had their occupations reported as 'Works in General or Unspecified Commodities' while 29 were Without Specified Occupations. Ten men were reported with Unknown Occupations. The most common occupations for women at this time were Works in Food and Lodging employing 52 women, Works in Dress (158) and Domestic services or Offices (384). 484 Women were reported as Persons Without Specified Occupations while 1,172 were reported with Unknown Occupations.

== Transport ==
The nearest train stations are Maryport rail station 2.62 miles (4.2 km), and Flimby rail station 4.44 miles (7.1 km).

== See also ==
- Listed buildings in Crosscanonby
