= St Mungo's Church, Dearham =

Coordinates: 54.7140°N 3.4412°W

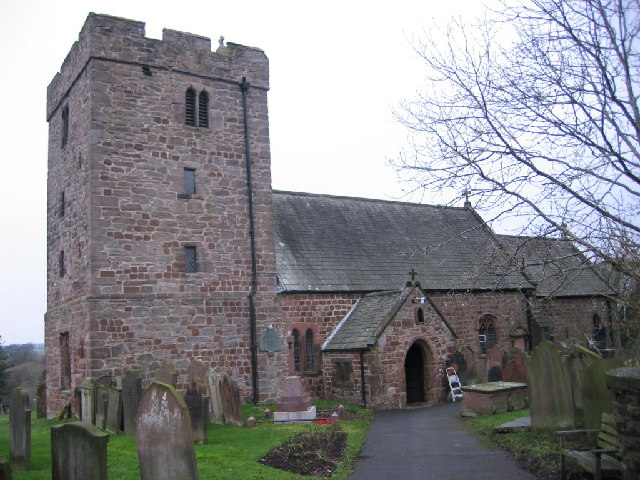
- St Mungo's Church, Dearham, from the south

- Location in Cumbria
- OS grid reference: NY 072 363
- Location: Dearham, Cumbria
- Country: England
- Denomination: Anglican
- Website: Dearham, St Mungo

History
- Status: Parish church
- Dedication: Saint Mungo

Architecture
- Functional status: Active
- Heritage designation: Grade I
- Designated: 3 March 1967
- Architect: C. J. Ferguson (north aisle)
- Architectural type: Church
- Style: Norman, Gothic Revival
- Groundbreaking: Late 12th century
- Completed: 1882

Specifications
- Materials: Sandstone, slate roofs

Administration
- Province: York
- Diocese: Carlisle
- Archdeaconry: West Cumberland
- Deanery: Solway
- Parish: Dearham

Clergy
- Vicar: Revd Canon Mary Day

St Mungo's Church is in the village of Dearham, Cumbria, England. The church is dedicated to St Mungo, also known as Kentigern, the apostle of Strathclyde. It is an active Anglican parish church in the deanery of Solway, the archdeaconry of West Cumberland, and the diocese of Carlisle. The church is recorded in the National Heritage List for England as a designated Grade I listed building.

== History ==
St Mungo's dates from the late 12th century, and the chancel was added in the 13th century. The architectural historian Nikolaus Pevsner was of the opinion that the Norman features, including the south door and some windows, date from about 1170–90, and that the tunnel vault in the lowest stage of the tower is also from this period or "a little later". The north aisle was added by C. J. Ferguson in 1882.

== Architecture ==
=== Exterior ===
The church is constructed in sandstone with green slate roofs. The foundations incorporate stones from former Roman buildings. Its plan consists of a three-bay nave with a north aisle and south porch, and a two-bay chancel at a lower level. At the west end is a square tower in three storeys. It has a two-light west window and two-light bell openings, and other small windows on each face. It is possible that this was a pele tower. The roofs have coped gables and cross finials. In the nave and the aisle the windows date from the 19th century, while the windows in the chancel are original; also in the chancel is a priest's doorway. Medieval graveslabs are built into the wall of the aisle.

=== Interior ===
The font is Norman, and is carved with representations of dragons and various patterns. The roof, fittings and furniture all date from the 19th century. The only stained glass is in the east window; it is by Clayton and Bell and depicts the Ascension. Pevsner refers to the "remarkable collection of Anglo-Danish fragments". These carved stones include a wheel-head cross standing 5 feet 4 inches (1.63 m) high; the Adam stone, with depictions of standing figures holding hands, a bearded head and the word "Adam"; and the Kenneth Cross, commemorating Saint Cenydd, with images of a man on a horse, and a bird facing a man.

== See also ==
- Grade I listed churches in Cumbria
- Listed buildings in Dearham
