= Charles Morris, Baron Morris of Grasmere =

British philosopher and life peer

Charles Richard Morris
- Born: Charles Richard Morris; 25 January 1898; Sutton Valence, Kent
- Died: 30 May 1990 (aged 92); Grasmere, Cumbria

Philosophical work
- Notable works: '

Charles Richard Morris, Baron Morris of Grasmere, KCMG (25 January 1898 – 30 May 1990) was an academic philosopher and Vice-Chancellor of the University of Leeds.

== Early life and education ==
Morris was born in Sutton Valence, Kent. He was educated at Tonbridge School and at Trinity College, Oxford from which he received a BA, later converted to MA.

== Career ==
From 1921 to 1943 Morris was a fellow and tutor in philosophy at Balliol College, Oxford. However, from 1939 during the Second World War he worked as a civil servant. He was appointed headmaster of King Edward's School, Birmingham, in 1941, taking up the post in 1943.

Morris was Vice-Chancellor of the University of Leeds from 1948 to 1963. In 1966 the University opened the Charles Morris Hall of Residence named after him. In 1955 he opened Netherhall School, Maryport, in Maryport, Cumbria.

Morris served as the chairman of both the Council for Training in Social Work and the Council for the Training of Health Visitors.

== Honours ==
Morris was made a Knight Bachelor in 1953 and a Knight Commander of the Order of St Michael and St George (KCMG) in 1963. In 1967 he became a life peer as "Baron Morris of Grasmere, of Grasmere in the County of Westmorland".

Morris received the following honorary degrees:

- DTech, University of Bradford
- DLitt, Lancaster University (1967)
- LLD, University of Aberdeen
- LLD, University of Manchester
- DLitt, University of Sydney
- LLD, University of Hull
- LLD, University of Malta (1964)
- LLD, University of Leeds

== Marriage and children ==
Morris married Mary, daughter of Ernest de Sélincourt. They had a son and a daughter and wrote a book together, A History of Political Ideas.

== Death ==
Lord Morris died at Grasmere in 1990 at the age of 92.

== Partial Bibliography ==
- A History of Political Ideals (1924)
- Locke, Berkeley, Hume (1931)
- British Democracy (1939)
- Idealistic Logic : a study of its aim, method and achievement (1970)
- The Expanding University, a report (1962)
- The Idea of Adult Education (1963)
- The University in the American Future (1965); contributor
- A Time of Passion : America 1960-1980 (1984)

Academic offices
Preceded by Bernard Mouat Jones	Vice-Chancellor, University of Leeds; 1948–1963	Succeeded by Roger Stevens
