= Milefortlet 22 =

Milefortlet of the Roman Cumbrian Coast defences

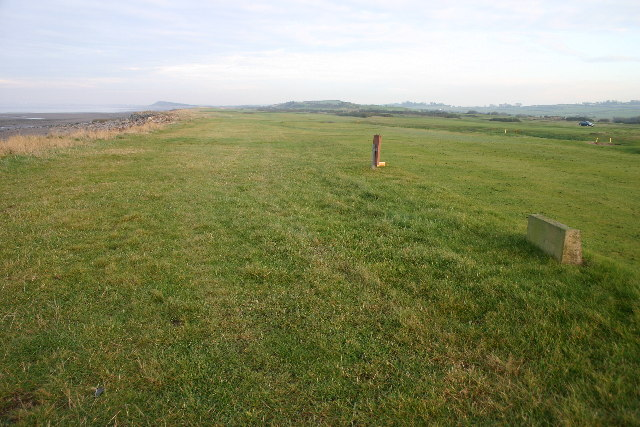
- Milefortlet 22 lies beneath Maryport Golf Course

- Location within Cumbria
- 54.7360°N 3.4663°W
- Type: Milecastle
- Location: Cumbria, England

Milefortlet 22 (Brownrigg) was a Milefortlet of the Roman Cumbrian Coast defences. These milefortlets and intervening stone watchtowers extended from the western end of Hadrian's Wall, along the Cumbrian coast and were linked by a wooden palisade. They were contemporary with defensive structures on Hadrian's Wall. There is little to see on the ground, but Milefortlet 22 has been located and excavated.

== Description ==
Milefortlet 22 is situated on Maryport Golf Course in the civil parish of Crosscanonby. The site is occupied by a golf green.

== Excavations ==
The site was excavated in 1962 and 1968. The 1962 excavations revealed the ditch and rampart, and uncovered flagged floors with pottery sherds found between the stones. The ditch appears to have been filled in and the fort dismantled after 140 AD. The 1968 excavations revealed an entrance 1.8 metres wide in the rampart facing the cliff. Along the other three sides there was a horseshoe shaped ditch. A gravel road along the cliff top turned into the fort.

== Associated Towers ==
Each milefortlet had two associated towers, similar in construction to the turrets built along Hadrian's Wall. These towers were positioned approximately one-third and two-thirds of a Roman mile to the west of the Milefortlet, and would probably have been manned by part of the nearest Milefortlet's garrison. The towers associated with Milefortlet 22 are known as Tower 22A (grid reference NY05293861) and Tower 22B (grid reference NY04863830). Tower 22A is identified with a low turf-covered mound, 10 centimetres high, on Maryport Golf Course. The location of Tower 22B is uncertain.
