= St John the Evangelist's Church, Crosscanonby =

Coordinates: 54.7373°N 3.4472°W

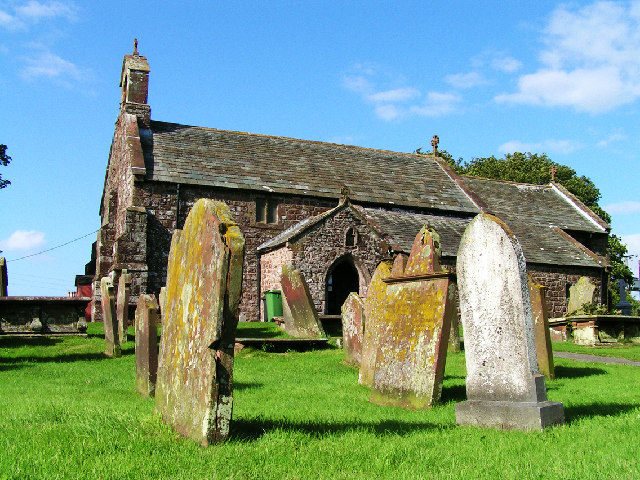
- St John the Evangelist's Church, Crosscanonby, from the south

- Location in Cumbria
- OS grid reference: NY 069 390
- Location: Crosscanonby, Cumbria
- Country: England
- Denomination: Anglican
- Website: St John, Crosscanonby

History
- Status: Parish church
- Dedication: St John the Evangelist

Architecture
- Functional status: Active
- Heritage designation: Grade I
- Designated: 3 March 1967
- Architectural type: Church
- Style: Norman, Gothic
- Completed: 1880

Specifications
- Materials: Red sandstone with green slate roofs

Administration
- Province: York
- Diocese: Carlisle
- Archdeaconry: West Cumberland
- Deanery: Solway
- Parish: Crosscanonby

Clergy
- Vicar: Revd Canon Mary Day

St John the Evangelist's Church is in the village of Crosscanonby, Cumbria, England. It is an active Anglican parish church in the deanery of Solway, the archdeaconry of West Cumberland and the diocese of Carlisle. The church is recorded in the National Heritage List for England as a designated Grade I listed building.

== History ==
The church stands on one of the earliest Christian sites in Cumbria. The present church was built in 1130 and the south aisle was added in the 13th century. Further alterations were made in the 14th century. A restoration was carried out in 1880 by C. J. Ferguson.

== Architecture ==
=== Exterior ===
St John's is constructed in red sandstone blocks and has a green slate roof. The roof has coped gables with cross finials. On the west gable is an open bellcote. There is evidence that the sandstone blocks originated from a former Roman building. The plan of the church consists of a three-bay nave with a south aisle, a south porch and a north vestry, and a single-bay chancel set at a lower level, with a south chapel that is continuous with the aisle. It is built in Norman style; the Norman features include the doorway, one of the windows in the south wall, the chancel arch, and one of the windows in the north wall of the chancel. The other windows date from the 19th century, other than two 20th-century dormer windows in the north side of the nave roof. A medieval graveslab is set into the west wall.

=== Interior ===
The font dates from the 13th century; it is square and is carved with leaf motifs. In the chancel is a piscina and an aumbry, Royal arms dated 1733 and boards carrying texts from a similar date. Over the chancel arch is a painting of the Last Supper, probably by Matthias Read. The stained glass in the east window, dating from 1849, is by John Scott of Carlisle. In the church is part of a 10th-century cross-shaft decorated with images of dragons, and a coffin lid inscribed with a cross, zigzags and a human figure.

== External features ==
Outside the church is an Anglo-Danish hog-back tombstone. One of the graves in the churchyard is that of John Smith, a local salt tax officer, who died in 1730. His tomb includes a carving of the salt officer sitting and working at his desk.

== See also ==
- Grade I listed churches in Cumbria
- Listed buildings in Crosscanonby

Media related to St John the Evangelist's church, Crosscanonby at Wikimedia Commons
