= River Ellen =

River in Cumbria, England

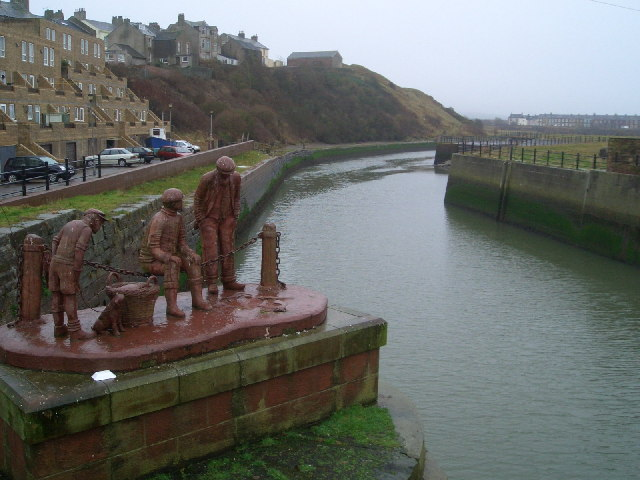
- The mouth of the River Ellen at Maryport harbour.

- Location of the mouth within Cumbria

Location
- Country: United Kingdom
- Constituent country: England

Physical characteristics
- Source: Skiddaw massif
  - location: Keswick, Northern Fells
- Mouth: Maryport harbour
  - location: Maryport, Solway Firth
  - coordinates: 54.7145°N 3.5013°W
- Length: 25 mi (40 km)

Basin features
- Tributaries
  - left: Gill Gooden
  - right: Dash Beck

The Ellen is a river in the English county of Cumbria, flowing from Skiddaw in the Northern Fells to the Solway Firth at Maryport. It was historically in the county of Cumberland. It is approximately 25 miles (40.2 km) in length.

== Etymology ==
The River Ellen gets its name from Common Brythonic *Alünā. *Alünā has an uncertain etymology but might come from Proto-Indo-European *ala meaning 'water'. Alternatively the name *Alünā could be derived from Alaunos or Alaunā. Names of this type could derive from the Celtic root *al- ('feed, raise, nurture') or *alǝ- (to wander'), or else from the Brittonic element *al-, "shining, bright" (Welsh alaw, 'waterlilly'). Another suggestion is that the name is derived from the Brittonic root *Alaun- (‘holy one’ or ‘mighty one’).

== Course ==
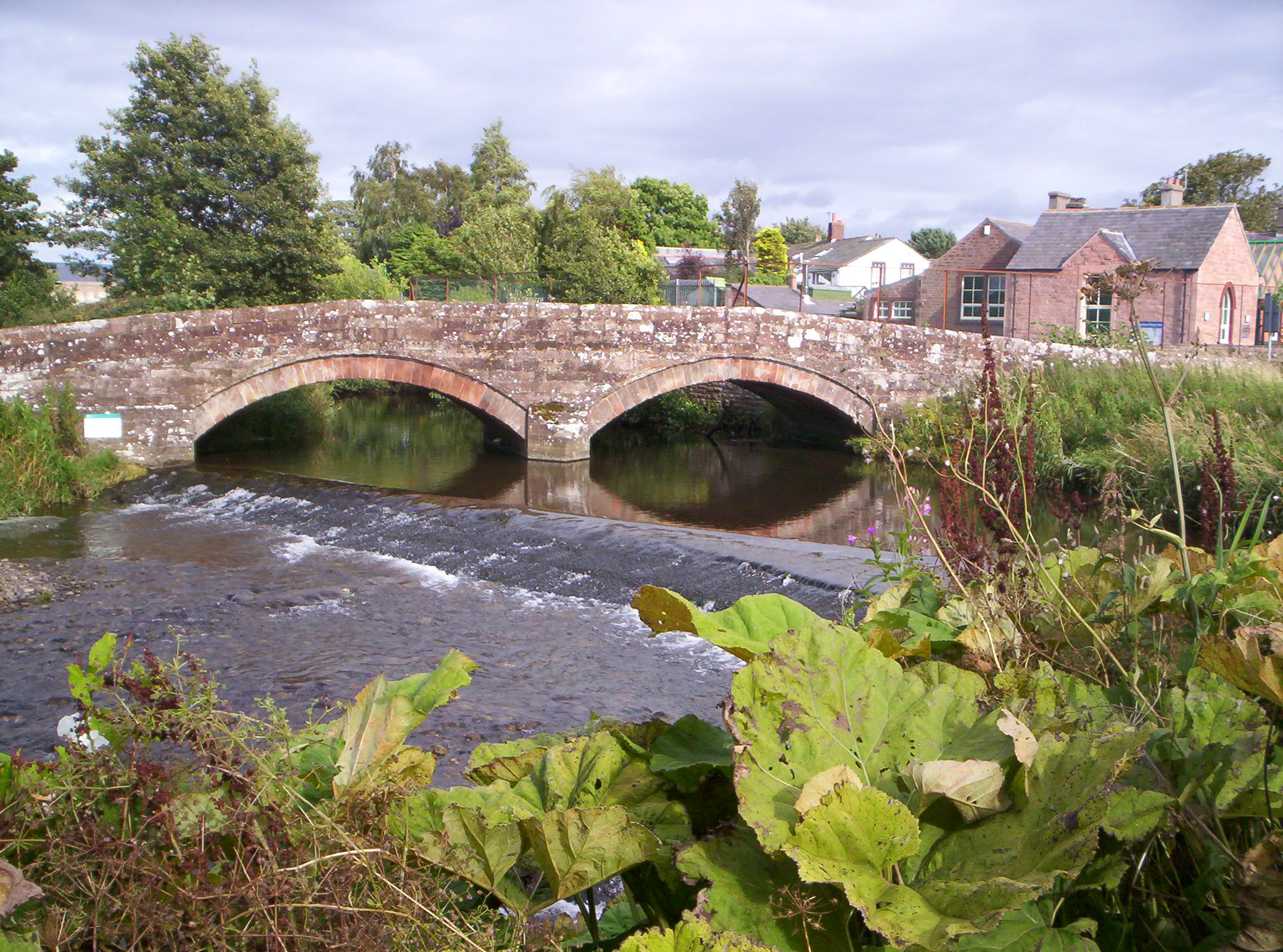
Bridge over the River Ellen dividing Baggrow and Blennerasset

The river rises on the Skiddaw massif, at a height of 560 metres on the western facing slopes of Great Sca Fell. and runs in a generally westerly direction, passing Uldale, Ireby, Boltongate, Baggrow and Blennerhasset parish boundary and Aspatria. From there, it continues southwest (instead of more northwesterly) past Oughterside, Gilcrux, Bullgill, Crosby and Dearham, and skirts the grounds of Netherhall School before flowing into the Solway Firth at Maryport.

== Fish ==
The river contains populations of brown trout, eels, lamprey, minnows, salmon, sea trout, and stickleback.

== Sewage contamination ==
In 2023, it was reported that a pipe owned by the water company United Utilities had discharged sewage into the river for almost 7,000 hours in 2022.

== Tributaries ==
- Dash Beck
- Gill Gooden
- Row Beck
