= Listed buildings in Gilcrux =

Historic buildings in Cumbria, England

Gilcrux is a civil parish in the Cumberland district in Cumbria, England. It contains two listed buildings that are recorded in the National Heritage List for England. Of these, one is listed at Grade II*, the middle grade, and the other is at Grade II, the lowest grade. The parch contains the village of Gilcrux and the surrounding countryside. The listed buildings consist of a church, and a farm and farm building.

== Key ==
| Grade | Criteria |
|---|---|
| II* | Particularly important buildings of more than special interest |
| II | Buildings of national importance and special interest |

== Buildings ==
| Name and location | Photograph | Date | Notes | Grade |
|---|---|---|---|---|
| St Mary's Church; 54.73081°N 3.37217°W | | Mid 12th century | The church was extended later in the 12th century, altered in the 14th and 15th centuries, and restored in 1878. It is in sandstone and has green slate roofs with coped gables and cross finials. The church consists of a nave, a south aisle and porch, and a chancel with a north vestry. On the west gable is an open bellcote, and above the porch is a sundial. | II* |
| Ellen Hall and barn 54.73668°N 3.37481°W | — | Mid 17th century | The farmhouse is rendered with a green slate roof, and has two storeys and three bays. It has a 20th-century porch and a doorway with a weathered inscribed lintel. The windows are sashes with hood moulds, and there is a small fire window. The barn to the right is in limestone rubble with a corrugated asbestos roof. It has a plank door with a chamfered surround, ventilation slits, a projecting cart entrance, and a lean-to shippon. Inside the house is an inglenook and a bressumer. | II |
