= William Perry Briggs =

William Perry Briggs (1856-1928) was the Medical Officer of Health for both the Wigton Rural District Sanitary Board and the Aspatria Urban District Council from the early 1880s until the time of his death in 1928.

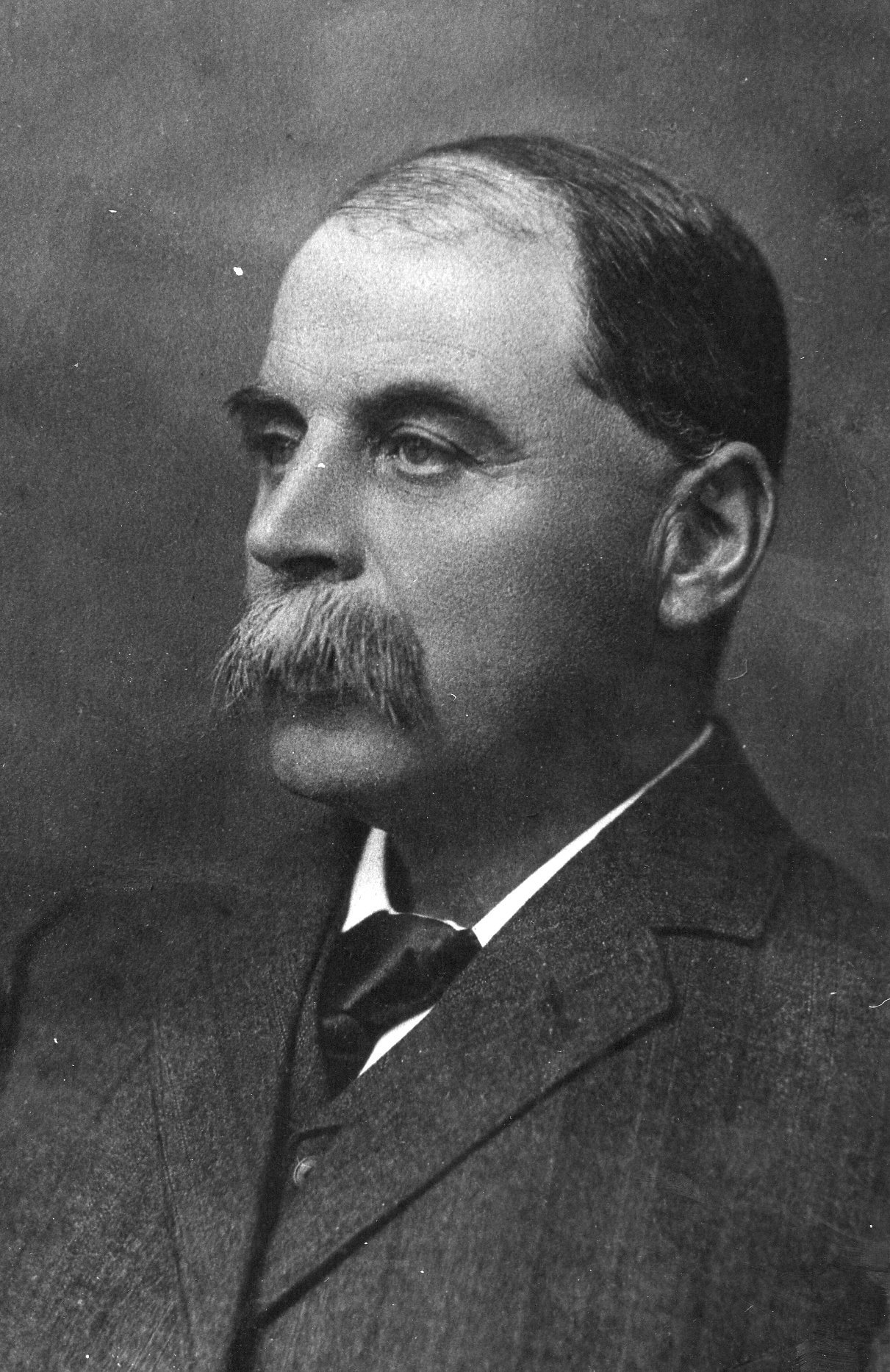
Dr William Perry Briggs M.D.

== Early life ==
William Perry Briggs was born at Gilcrux, Cumbria in 1856. He began his education at the local school. An exceptional student, he received a scholarship to study medicine under Lord Lister at the University of Edinburgh, where he qualified as a physician and surgeon. In early life he gained considerable practical experience, when serving as a medical officer in the Russo-Turkish War (1877–78), where he was involved in the siege of Plevna. In 1879 he arrived at Aspatria where he became junior partner to Dr William Hodgson. His reputation as a medical practitioner was quickly recognised and upon the death of his partner he assumed the business, employing Ian McQuarry as an assistant. When, in the 1920s, McQuarry left the area he was replaced by Archibald Rankin, whose descendants were still practicing in the town in the early part of the twenty-first century.

== Medical officer of health ==
In accordance with the requirements of the Public Health Act 1875 Briggs became Medical Officer of Health to the Wigton Rural District Sanitary Board in the mid 1880s, a position he continued to fulfil until the end of his life. In September 1892, after the creation of the Aspatria Local Board, he also became their Medical Officer of Health. A position he retained in 1895, after the Local Government Act 1894 created the Aspatria Urban District Council. The role demanded the submission of a quarterly and annual report, which although concise contained a series of informative statistics. He also had a responsibility for ensuring the health of the water supply which originally came from a series of wells and Pumps in the district; the sewerage system, the slaughterhouses and the ash tips. He also had to notify the department of health whenever an infectious disease occurred. In 1901, he informed the council that from a population of 2,888 the birth rate was 25.3 per 1,000; death rate 13.5 per 1,000; infant mortality, rate of deaths under one year per 1,000 births 137; Zygotic rate 2.7; tubercular rate 1.5; cancer rate 2.07. During that year he had registered 73 births, 48 males and 33 females. He also registered 37 deaths, which related to one in 13.5 per 1,000. Ten deaths had occurred under one year of age, seven aged between 1 and 5, three between the age of 5 and 15, one between 15 and 25, thirteen between 25 and 65 and five over 65 years. Five deaths were attributed to measles, one to whooping cough, one to diphtheria, one to enteric fever, one to influenza, three to phthisis, two to other tubercular diseases, six to cancer, one to bronchitis, one to pneumonia, one to alcoholism, three to premature births, four to heart disease, three to accidents, and six to various other causes. He had notified the authorities on 18 occasions when infectious diseases had occurred, these included nine cases of scarlet fever, six of erysipelas, two typhoid fever, and one of diphtheria.

== Working practice ==
Briggs was a modern practitioner with a flair for modern methods and modern ideas. He understood the correlation between life expectancy, public health and the living conditions of the people; he understood the relationship between dirt and infection. In his endeavour to improve the quality of life of the people he championed many social reforms. He was largely responsible for the introduction of the Overwater Gravitational Water Scheme, from which Aspatria and Silloth draw their drinking water. He also proposed the laying of sewers within Aspatria; thus eliminating a major source of the prevailing insanitary conditions that directly led to the epidemic killer diseases, Cholera and Typhoid. He also challenged the evils of acute household overcrowding. When the opportunity arose, he encouraged the Urban District Council to build two successful housing schemes in the district. On one occasion he had the satisfaction of reporting the lowest death rate of any other urban district in England and Wales, upon which he received many congratulations from the medical fraternity. Briggs practiced medicine at a time when the country doctor was expected to be a ‘master of all trades’; he was not a GP in the modern sense, hospitalisation in rural communities was rare, if not unheard of. He had to contend with a variety of epidemics in addition to the Coal mining and agricultural accidents, many of which required major surgery and amputations.

== Community work ==
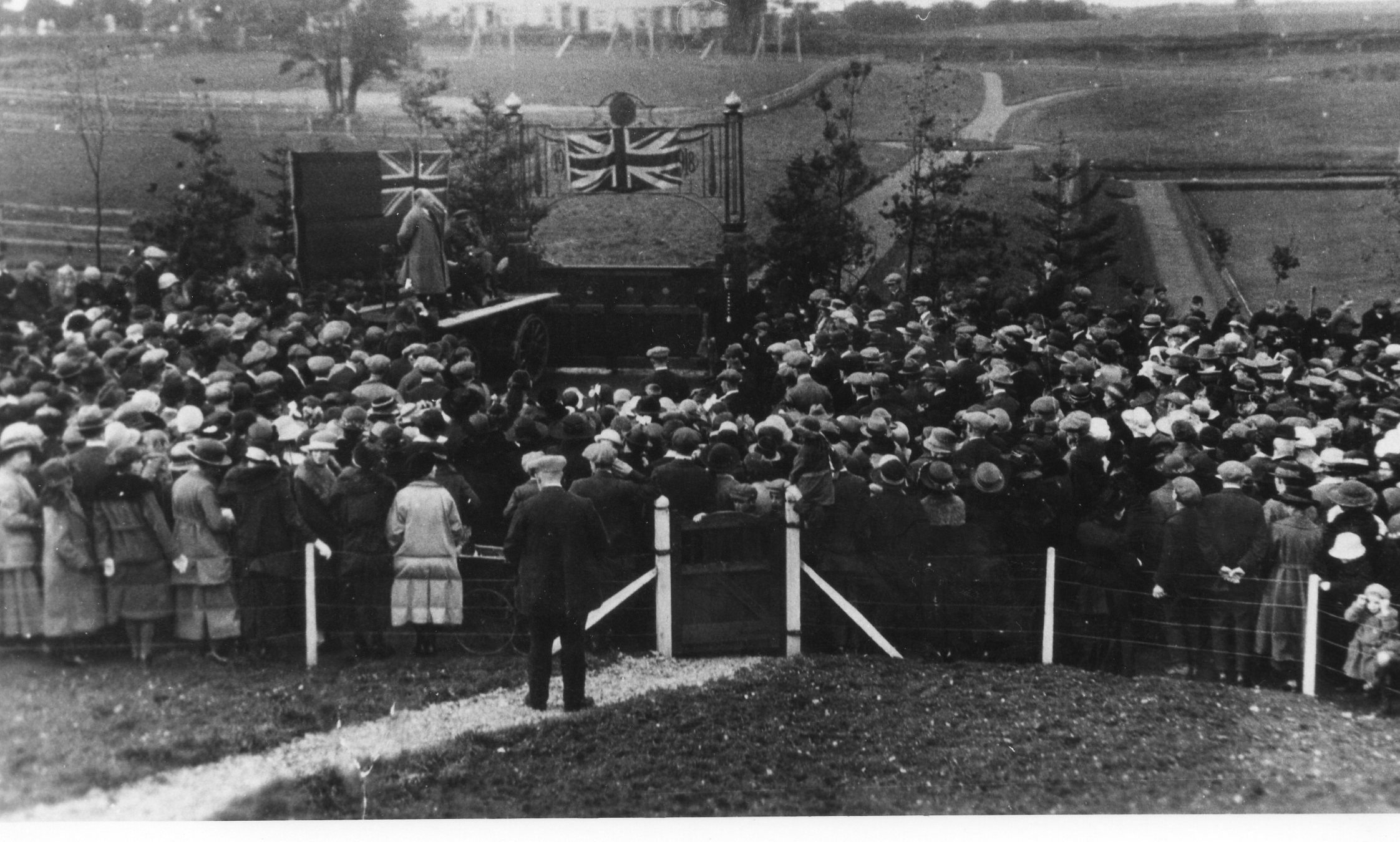
Dr William Perry Briggs, Opening War Memorial 18 October 1922

In politics he was a liberal and a true champion for the welfare of the common people; he took a great interest in the church and was the chairman of the war memorial committee; for an extensive period he was also a commissioner for income tax for the Allerdale Below Derwent Division. In sport he took a keen interest in Cricket; first playing for the Aspatria and Brayton club before taking on the administrative role of president, a position he held for over thirty years. Towards the latter end of the nineteenth century he was also president of the Aspatria Rugby Union Football Club.

== Family and death ==
Doctor Briggs was twice married and had a son and daughter to his first wife. He died on 20 April 1928, aged 72 years. His remains lie in the shadow of the mock Gosforth Cross at the eastern end of Aspatria churchyard.

== Bibliography ==
- J. Rose; M. Dunglinson (1987). Aspatria. Chichester: Philmore & Co. Ltd.
- Anne Usher Thomas (1993). Aspatria. Stroud: Alan Sutton Publishing ltd.
