= Listed buildings in Dearham =

Dearham is a civil parish in the Cumberland unitary authority area of Cumbria, England. It contains two listed buildings that are recorded in the National Heritage List for England. Of these, one is listed at Grade I, the highest of the three grades, and the others are at Grade II, the lowest grade. The parish contains the village of Dearham and the surrounding countryside. The listed buildings consist of a church and a milestone.

== Key ==
Grade	Criteria
I	Buildings of exceptional interest, sometimes considered to be internationally important
II	Buildings of national importance and special interest

== Buildings ==
Name and location	Photograph	Date	Notes	Grade
St Mungo's Church; 54.71397°N 3.44122°W		Late 12th century	The tower dates from the 14th century, and the north aisle was added in 1882 by C. J. Ferguson. The church is in sandstone, and the roof, which has coped gables with cross finials, is in green slate. The church consists of a west tower, a nave with a north aisle and a south porch, and a chancel. The square tower is unbutressed, most of the windows are small, and it has an embattled parapet. Medieval grave slab fragments are built into the east wall of the porch.	I
Milestone; 54.70341°N 3.44993°W	—	Late 18th or early 19th century	The milestone was provided for the Cockermouth to Maryport Turnpike road. It is in sandstone with a rounded top and has a cast iron plate. The plate is inscribed with the distances in miles to Cockermouth Court House and to Maryport Market Place.	II
