= Dearham =

Village in Cumbria, England

Coordinates: 54.7105°N 3.4427°W

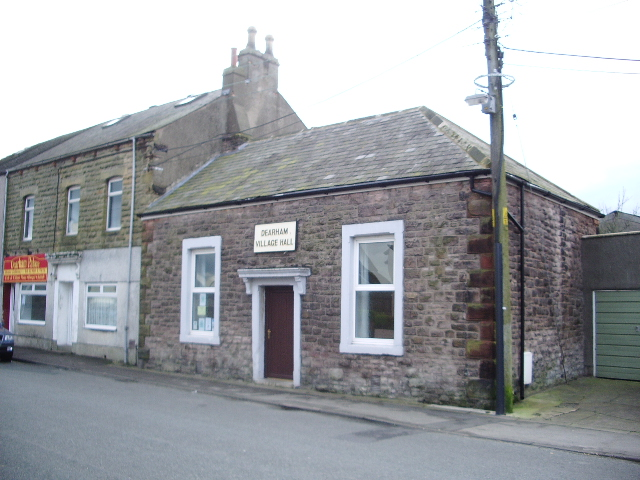
- Dearham Village Hall

- Location in Allerdale Location within Cumbria
- Population: 2,151 (2021)
- OS grid reference: NY075365
- Civil parish: Dearham
- Unitary authority: Cumberland
- Ceremonial county: Cumbria
- Region: North West
- Country: England
- Sovereign state: United Kingdom
- Post town: Maryport
- Postcode district: CA15
- Dialling code: 01900
- Police: Cumbria
- Fire: Cumbria
- Ambulance: North West
- UK Parliament: Penrith and Solway

Dearham is a village and civil parish in Cumbria, historically part of Cumberland, near the Lake District National Park in England. It lies about 2 miles (3.2 km) east of Maryport and 5 miles (8.0 km) west of Cockermouth. At the 2021 census, the parish had a population of 2,151.

== Toponymy ==
'Dearham' is an Old Anglian compound of 'dēor' and 'hām'. Old Anglian is Old English. 'Dēor' means 'deer', 'hām' is 'homestead' or 'village' or 'estate'.

== History ==
With its resources of coal and easy access to railways, Dearham is part of Cumberland's former coal mining industry. It saw its population increase from 515 in 1821 to 2,598 in 1891 due to the expansion of coal mining. However, with the decline of deep mining and, later, open cast working, the coal industry ceased to be a source of employment in the area.

Historically, Dearham was in the Workington division of the County of Cumberland, in the ward of Allerdale below Derwent. It belonged to the Derwent Petty sessional division, Cockermouth Union and the County Court district of Cockermouth and Workington.

The village also belongs to the rural deanery of Maryport, the Archdeacon of West Cumberland and the Diocese of Carlisle.

== Governance ==
Dearham is part of the Penrith and Solway constituency since 2024, and has been represented by Markus Campbell-Savours of the Labour Party since the 2024 general election. Prior to 2024, the town was part of the parliamentary constituency of Workington, which was abolished in the 2023 boundary review.

For Local Government purposes it is in the Cumberland unitary authority area.

Dearham has its own Parish Council; Dearham Parish Council.

== Education ==
The village has a primary school with approximately 253 children on roll and a nursery with approximately 26 children on roll.

The majority of young people in Dearham attend Netherhall School, Maryport, Cockermouth School, Cockermouth and Keswick School, Keswick for their secondary schooling.

== St Mungo's Church ==
St Mungo's Church, was erected in the early 12th century, is a building of stone, with 13th-century chancel, nave, south porch and a 14th-century Pele tower.

During restoration work carried out on the church in 1882, two stones were discovered:-

- The first is the 4-foot-high (1.2 m) Adam Stone, which depicts the Fall and Redemption of man and dates from 900 AD;
- The second is the Kenneth Cross, which depicts the legend of the 6th-century hermit, St. Kenneth/ Cenydd.

== Transport ==
=== Dearham Railway station ===
Dearham railway station (not to be confused with Dearham Bridge railway station) was on the single track Derwent Branch of the Maryport and Carlisle Railway (M&CR) in the then county of Cumberland, now Cumbria, England.

The station was opened in 1867, situated on the south eastern edge of Dearham towards Crosby. The service through the station survived until 1935.

== Notable people ==
- Alvin Ackerley, professional rugby league footballer.
- Harry Archer, professional rugby league footballer.
- William Slater Calverley, vicar.
- John Cuthbertson, instrument maker.
- John Osmaston, owner of the Dearham Colliery.
- Josh Skelton, racing driver.

== See also ==
- Listed buildings in Dearham
