= Cenydd =

6th-century Welsh saint

Saint Cenydd
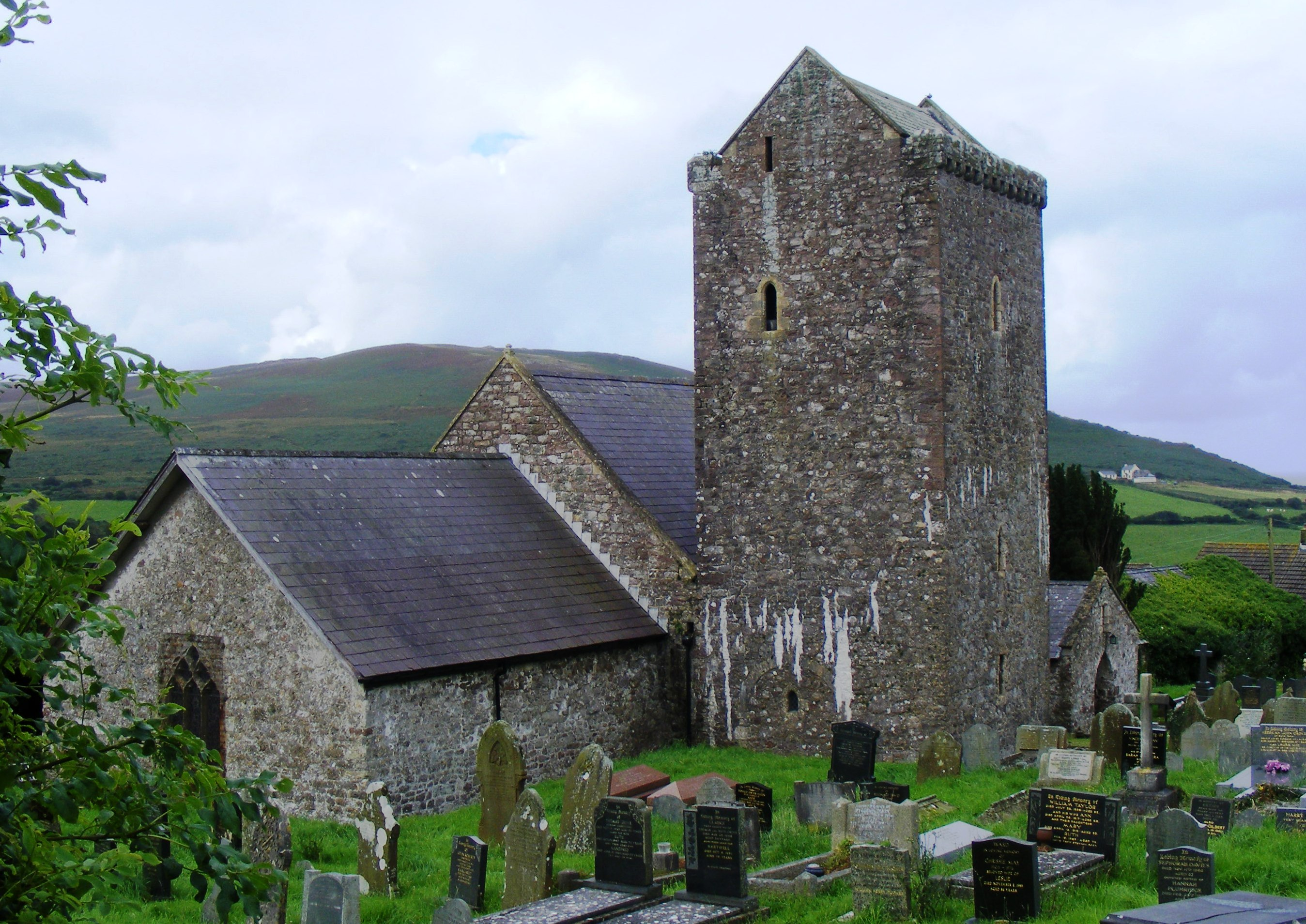
- St Cenydd's Church, Llangennith
- Died: 6th century
- Venerated in: Orthodox Church, Roman Catholic Church, Church in Wales
- Major shrine: Llangennith (Wales); Languidic (Brittany)
- Patronage: Llangennith

Saint Cenydd (Modern Welsh: Cennydd; French: Kinède; fl. c. 6th century), sometimes anglicised as Saint Kenneth, was a Christian hermit on the Gower Peninsula in Wales, where he is credited with the foundation of the church at Llangennith.

== Legend ==
Liturgical calendars and place-name evidence suggest the historical existence of Cenydd. His legend, however, is too late and too obviously derivative to be relied upon. According to Welsh sources collected in the 15th century by John Capgrave and published in the Nova Legenda Angliae, Cenydd was a Breton prince, the son of "King Dihoc" (presumably Deroch II of Domnonée) by an allegedly incestuous relationship with his own daughter. While the poor girl was pregnant, Deroch was summoned by King Arthur to attend the Christmas festivities being held at his court in Aber Llychwr (Loughor).

A cripple, Cenydd was placed in a cradle made of osiers and cast into the estuary of the River Loughor (a fate that befell several early British saints) and eventually landed on Worm's Head. Seagulls and angels with a miraculous breast-shaped bell ensured that he survived and was educated as a Christian.

He became a hermit, his only companion being an untrustworthy servant whose dishonesty was revealed when he stole a spear from one of a group of robbers who had been hospitably received by his master. In 545, Saint David cured Cenydd while traveling to the Synod of Brefi but he preferred to remain as he was born and prayed for his infirmity to be restored.

An incised stone monument featuring images apparently of the Cenydd legend was discovered during renovation work at St Mungo's Church, Dearham (Cumbria), in the 1880s and is displayed there as the 'Kenneth Stone'. The Saint's connection with Cumbria is currently unexplained.

According to the unreliable Iolo Morganwg, Cenydd was a son of Gildas and married and had a son before entering Llanilltud Fawr as a monk under Saint Illtud. Cenydd's son, Ffili, later a Bishop, was said to be the namesake of Caerphilly.

Cenydd is associated with the remains of a Pre-Norman hermitage on Burry Holms, an island at the northern end of Rhossili Bay. In Brittany, he is chiefly associated with Languidic, but there is a chapel (Saint-Quidy) dedicated to him in Ploumelin or, with more modern French spelling, Plumelin - not to be confused with Plomelin which is also in Brittany.

== Feast day ==
Cenydd's feast day is celebrated at Llangennith on 5 July. Up to the early twentieth century the festival was traditionally marked by the displaying of an effigy of a bird from a pole on the church tower, symbolising the legendary birds who cared for the infant Cenydd, and the consumption of whitepot or 'milked meat' a dish made of flour, milk, sugar and dried fruits, not unlike a rice pudding or bread and butter pudding (see also Cuisine of Gower). The practice has been revived in recent years. William Worcester also records the feast of his translation, apparently to somewhere in North Wales, on 27 June.

The Church of St Peter and St Cenydd is located in Senghenydd. St. Cenydd Community School is in Caerphilly, as is the St Cenydd Leisure Centre.
