= Crosby, Cumbria =

Village in Cumbria, England

Coordinates: 54.732°N 3.438°W

Crosby
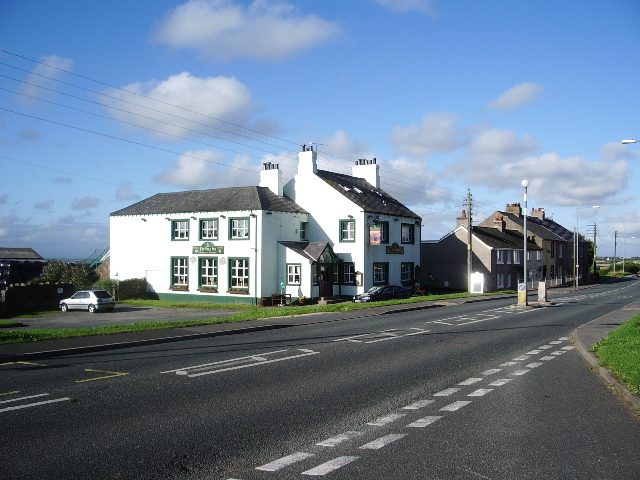
- The Stag Inn, Crosby

- Location in Allerdale Location within Cumbria
- Area: 0.3450 km^{2} (0.1332 sq mi)
- Population: 791 (2020 estimate)
  - Density: 2,293/km^{2} (5,940/sq mi)
- OS grid reference: NY074384
- Civil parish: Crosscanonby
- Unitary authority: Cumberland
- Ceremonial county: Cumbria
- Region: North West
- Country: England
- Sovereign state: United Kingdom
- Post town: MARYPORT
- Postcode district: CA15
- Dialling code: 01900
- Police: Cumbria
- Fire: Cumbria
- Ambulance: North West
- UK Parliament: Penrith and Solway

Crosby is a small village in the county of Cumbria, historically within Cumberland, near the Lake District National Park. It is 3 miles (4.8 km) north-east of Maryport + 25.1 miles (40.4 km) south-west of Carlisle, on the A596 road. In 2020 the built-up area had an estimated population of 791. In 1870-72 the township had a population of 506. The local primary school is Crosscanonby St. John's Church of England School.

The only remaining public house in the village is The Stag Inn.

== Governance ==
The village is in the parliamentary constituency of Penrith and Solway.

For Local Government purposes it is in the Cumberland unitary authority area.

The village also has its own Parish Council; Crosscanonby Parish Council.

== See also ==
- List of places in Cumbria
