= Carlisle railway history =

History of railways in Carlisle, England

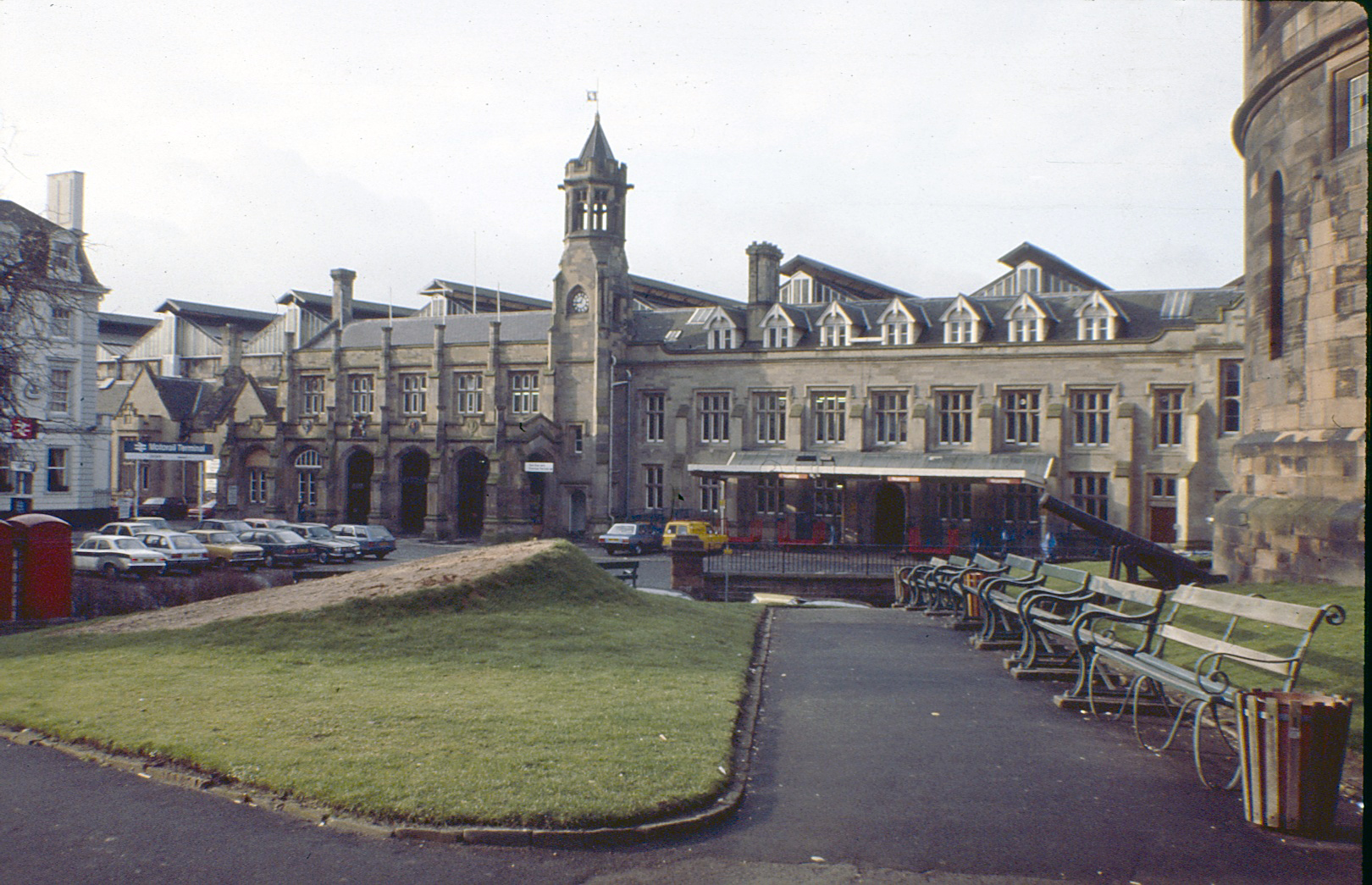
Carlisle railway station

Carlisle, in North West England, formed the focus for a number of railway routes because of the geography of Cumbria. At first each railway company had its own passenger and goods station, but in 1847 passenger terminal facilities were concentrated at Citadel station, which is in use today. Goods facilities remained dispersed, and goods wagons passing through were remarshalled, incurring delay and expense.

Congestion at the station increased over the years until in 1877 by-pass lines for goods traffic were provided, although the dispersed terminal facilities largely remained. The passenger station itself, although imposing, remained confined and inadequate.

Carlisle Kingmoor Marshalling Yard opened in 1963, but wagonload traffic was already near the end of its commercial life, and the costly yard facilities were soon reduced as demand declined.

Today Carlisle is an important point on the West Coast Main Line railway, and a junction for radiating secondary routes. Passenger traffic is buoyant, and long-distance freight trains pass through.

== Carlisle Canal ==
The city of Carlisle is in Cumbria in north-west England, at a strategic transport location at the crossing of the River Eden (of which it was the lowest bridging point). The Eden flows westward into the Solway Firth, a wide body of water that forms a natural barrier. Transport by shipping could not be brought to Carlisle due to shoaling in the Solway and Eden. Hilly ground surrounds Carlisle on the landward sides, and land transport routes must either follow river valleys, or cross very high ground. The Tyne Gap eased transport across the country to and from the east coast.

Its location led to Carlisle becoming an important point on transport routes, and as industry developed, the need for cheaper transport of raw materials into Carlisle was a constant theme. In August 1818 £30,000 was subscribed for shares in a Carlisle Canal, connecting a basin in Carlisle to Fisher's Cross, on the channel of the River Eden and accessible to the Solway Firth. The Carlisle Canal obtained its authorising act of Parliament, the Carlisle Canal Act 1819 (59 Geo. 3. c. xiii) on 6 April 1819, and it was completed and opened on 12 March 1823.

== Newcastle and Carlisle Railway ==
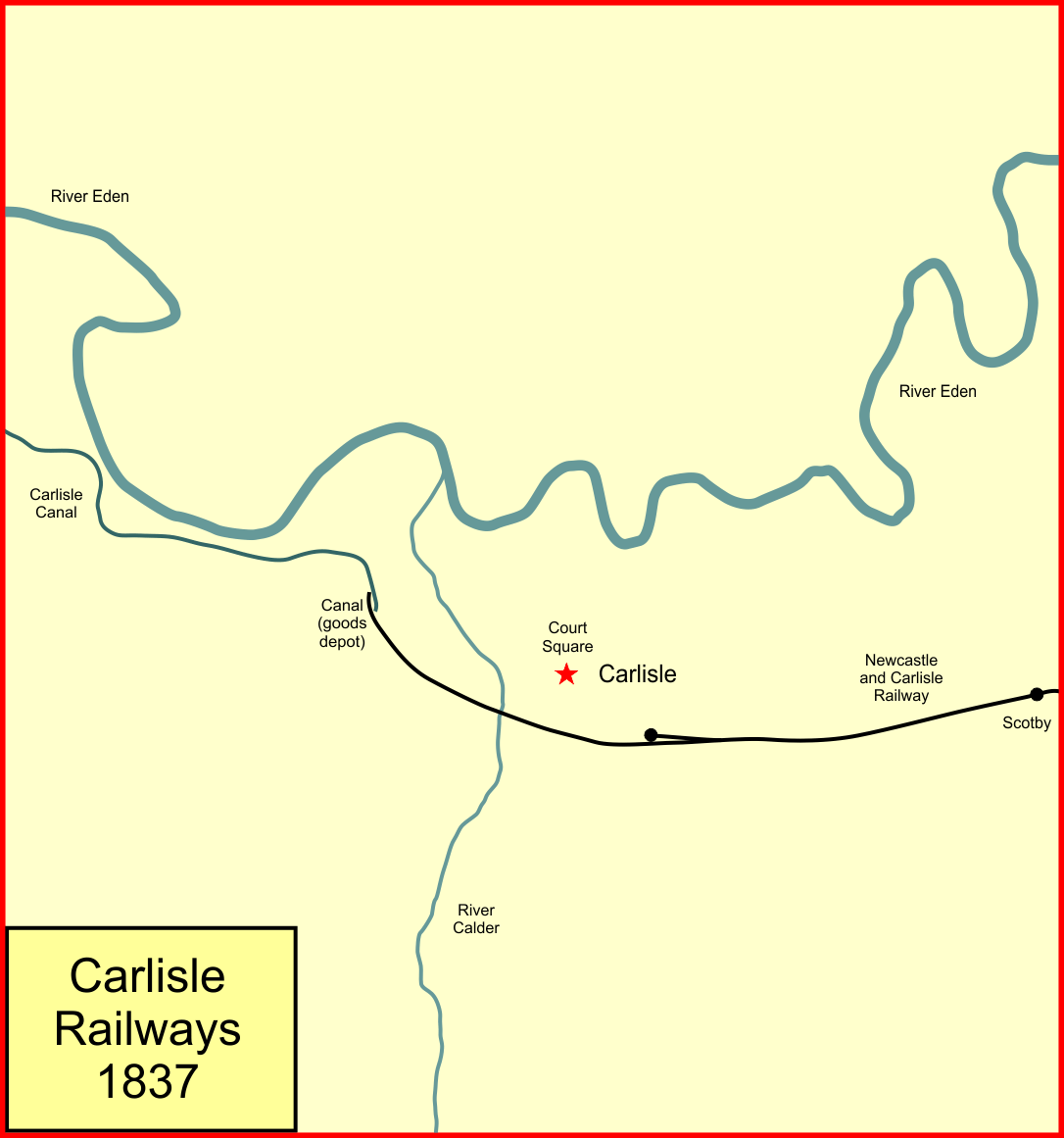
Railways of Carlisle in 1837

The land route between Newcastle upon Tyne and Carlisle had long been used for the transport of goods, and there was considerable trade on the east–west route. However, the road was inconvenient and the transit was slow, and a canal connecting Newcastle and Carlisle was proposed. The engineer William Chapman had earlier surveyed a route for such a canal, and he was brought back in 1824 to update his plans; this time he found that while a canal would be practicable, a railway would be cheaper. Chapman's recommendation was subject to considerable controversy over the details of the route and the possible use of steam traction, and it was not until 22 May 1829 that the Newcastle and Carlisle Railway was authorised by the Newcastle-upon-Tyne and Carlisle Railway Act 1829 (10 Geo. 4. c. lxxii) with capital of £300,000. The early priority for construction was at the eastern parts of the line, but at the western end the line from Greenhead to the Carlisle station at London Road was opened on 19 July 1836. The Newcastle and Carlisle Railway adopted right-hand running on double track sections.

The original intention had been to connect directly to the Carlisle Canal, but this was delayed, and the connection to the canal became a "branch"; the first traffic was grain, which passed on the branch on 25 February 1837, and it was fully opened on 9 March 1837.

== Maryport and Carlisle Railway ==
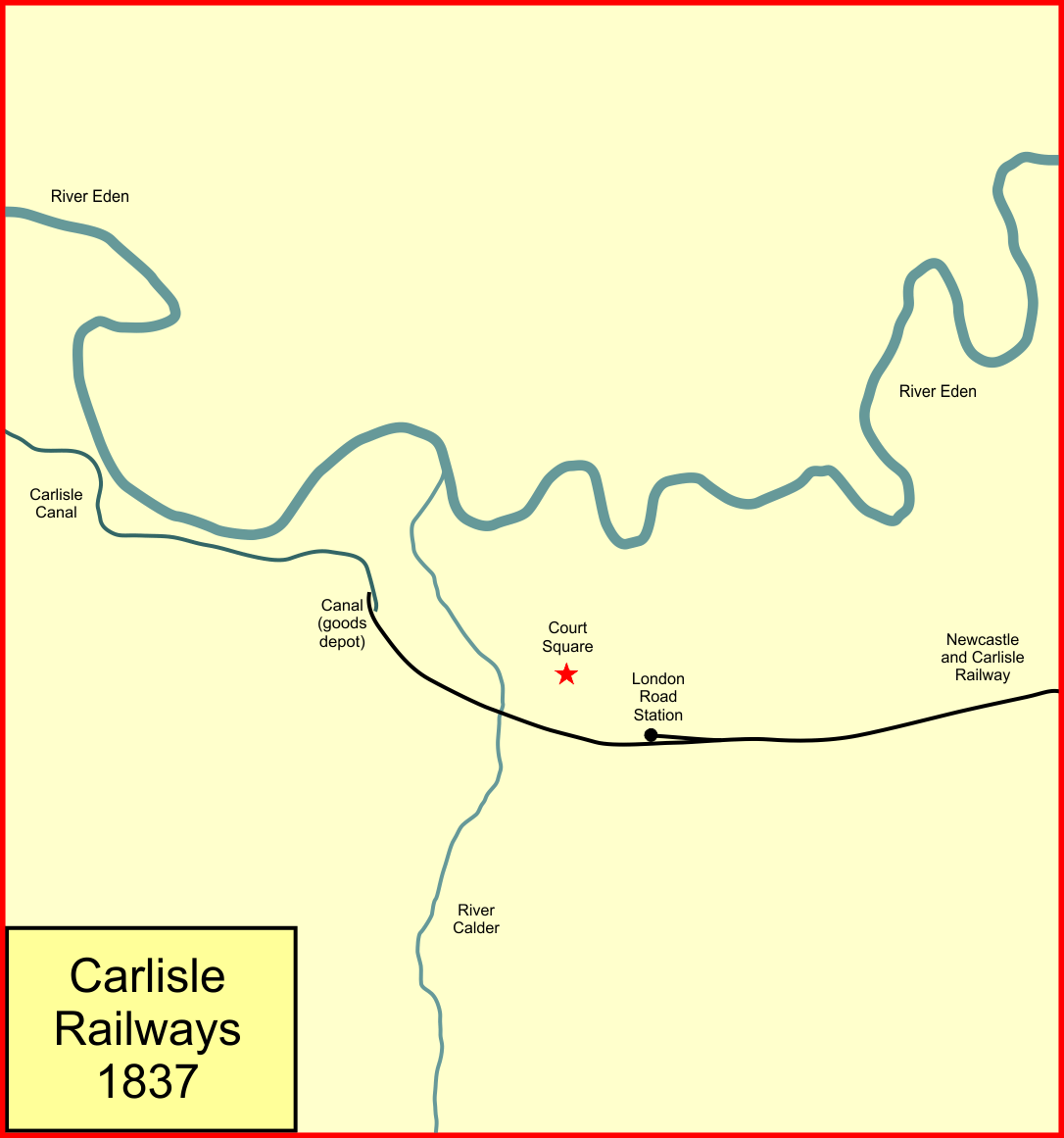
Railways of Carlisle in 1843

Maryport had been a significant port further west on the Cumberland coast, and was also in an important area of coal extraction. Following local interest, the Maryport and Carlisle Railway was incorporated on 12 July 1837. It was constructed from the Maryport end at first; then a section at the Carlisle end was opened on 10 May 1843. For the time being there was a gap at the centre of the route, only closed when the line was completed in early 1845.

The Carlisle section of the line formed a junction with the Newcastle and Carlisle Railway at Bog Junction, or Bogfield. (Contemporary reports are inconsistent in nomenclature.) (Note: The Bog Junction was not the later junction of the same name, which was located elsewhere.)

The Maryport and Carlisle passenger station was at Water Lane, close to the present day St Nicholas Street. It was described by the Carlisle Journal as "nearly on the site of the ancient hospital of Saint Nicholas". The M&CR and the Port Carlisle extension of the N&CR ran alongside one another at this point, and they joined a little to the east; some M&CR trains continued to the N&CR London Road station. All M&CR goods traffic was handled at the London Road station.

The London Road terminus faced eastwards, so that use of it by M&CR trains involved a backshunt. The cramped Water Lane station was only a temporary measure, and the M&CR had acquired land at Crown Street for their intended permanent terminus. Unfortunately the parliamentary bill for that was rejected on a technicality in the 1843 session. When it was resubmitted in 1844, it was considered together with the bill for the Lancaster and Carlisle Railway; both bills were passed (on 6 June 1844) as the Maryport and Carlisle Railway Act 1844 (7 & 8 Vict. c. xxxvi) and the Lancaster and Carlisle Railway Act 1844 (7 & 8 Vict. c. xxxvi). and serious difficulties later arose. The L&CR and the M&CR schemes both required facilities for a terminus, and for some time it proved impossible to negotiate a mutually acceptable arrangement.

== Linking England and Scotland ==
By 1840 it was obvious that the disconnected local railways in Great Britain must eventually link to form a network; this was already taking shape in England, and much thought was given to connecting the cities of central Scotland with the growing English network. The topography of the intervening land was challenging, with high ground of the Cumbrian Mountains and the Southern Uplands forming natural barriers. The locomotives of the day were not considered capable of hauling trains on a trunk railway over the steep gradients thought to be unavoidable, and many creative schemes were put forward to route round the hilly country. Not all of these schemes were well designed, but the best connected important population centres at the expense of considerable extra mileage. In addition, any route running close to the North Sea coast would have to make the difficult crossings of the River Tyne and the River Tweed.

Carlisle was an obvious routing point for some Anglo-Scottish routes, but Newcastle was strongly advanced by promoters of an east-coast route. For some time it was assumed that only a single Anglo-Scottish route was commercially supportable, and a government-appointed commission was established to select the best route, but its findings failed to quell the enthusiasm of investors, and in the end its report was ignored.

Two factions were able to build Anglo-Scottish routes at this period: although multiple companies were involved in each, the necessary co-operation formed natural alliances, and these became known as the East Coast Route (through Newcastle and Berwick-upon-Tweed) and the West Coast Route (through Carlisle).

== Lancaster and Carlisle Railway ==
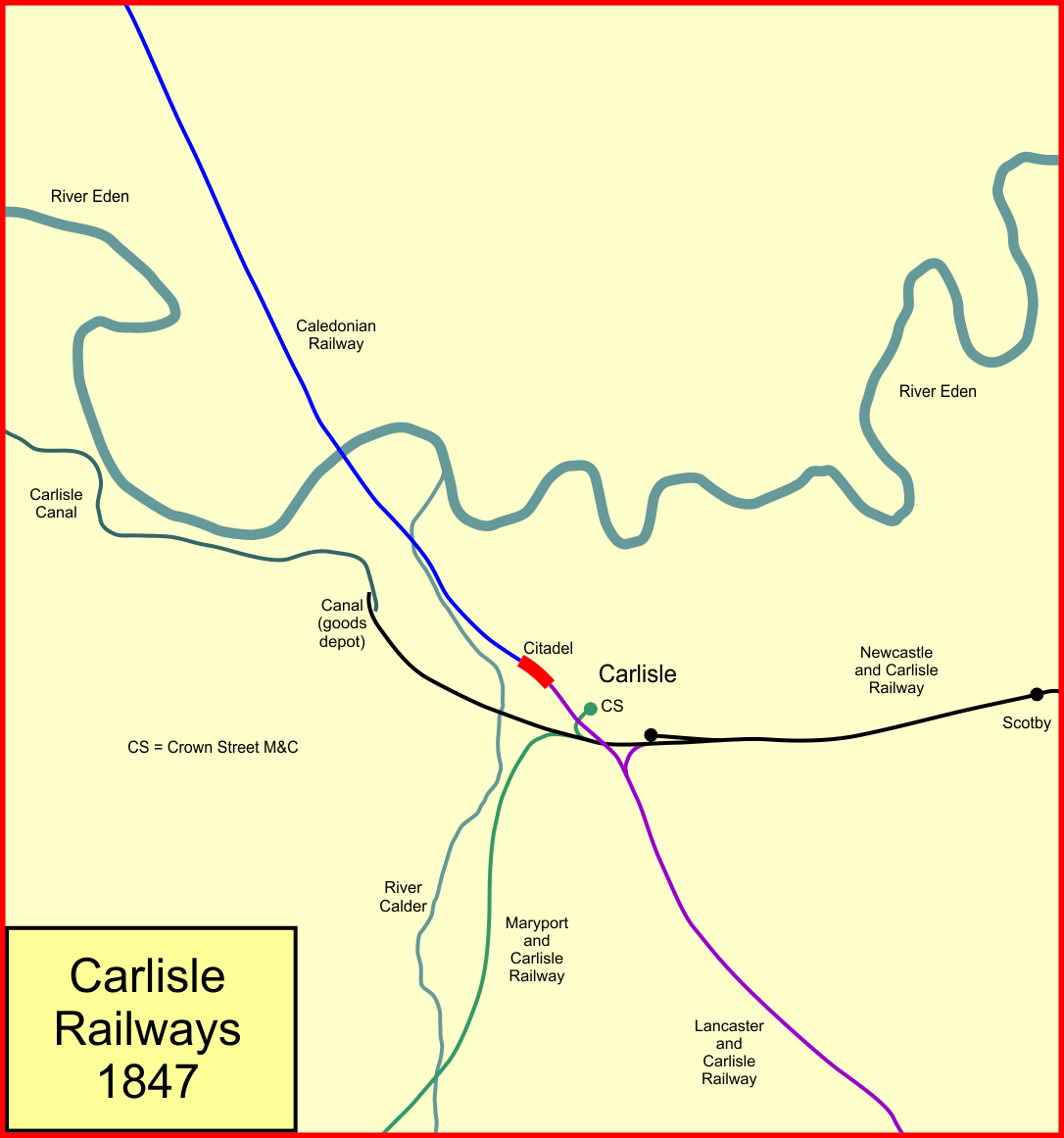
Railways of Carlisle in 1847

The West Coast Route was gradually taking shape, from the origins of the London and Birmingham Railway and the Grand Junction Railway (from Birmingham to Manchester and Liverpool). The northward push was supported by the North Union Railway and the Lancaster and Preston Junction Railway.

The Lancaster and Carlisle Railway was incorporated on 6 June 1844, and it opened its line as far as Carlisle on 17 December 1846, from which date a continuous line between London and Carlisle was available. The issue of the L&CR station at Carlisle was not yet settled, so the first L&CR trains used the Newcastle and Carlisle Railway's London Road station, reached by a sharp south-to-east curve that had been authorised on 21 June 1845, and which (as for the M&CR trains) required a backshunt to enter the station. The train service was not intensive so for the time being this was not a great operating difficulty. However, this was far from convenient for the future Anglo-Scottish trunk route that was clearly forming, and the question of the station at Carlisle was to create a serious difficulty.

== Caledonian Railway ==
The rivalry to operate the principal route from Central Scotland to the English railway network had resulted in two winners. The North British Railway opened from Edinburgh to Berwick on 1 July 1847, linking there with the York, Newcastle and Berwick Railway. The East Coast Route was the first to be able to advertise a through route between Edinburgh and London, although rail bridges over the Tweed and the Tyne were not yet ready, and for some time the journey involved a foot (or omnibus) crossing of the rivers.

The Caledonian Railway had delayed a year in seeking authorisation, only obtaining the Caledonian Railway Act 1845 (8 & 9 Vict. c. clxii) on 31 July 1845. It was to form a Y-shape, connecting Glasgow and Edinburgh with Carlisle, and at the 122 miles in extent, was one of the largest railway projects authorised up to this date. In fact the southern end of its system was the first to open, between Carlisle and Beattock, on 10 September 1847. (Note: The directors had a private trial run the previous day.) The line northwards to Glasgow was not ready until 15 February 1848, and to Edinburgh on 1 April 1848. However, before the first opening the question of the Carlisle station had to be settled.

== Citadel station ==
As the prime mover in forming a trunk route from the south to Carlisle, the Lancaster and Carlisle Railway hoped to build a Carlisle station, at Court Square. The intention was that all the railways at Carlisle would use it, sharing the construction cost. The companies already in Carlisle, the N&CR and the M&CR, were sore at having spent money on their own terminus (in the case of the N&CR) or the land acquisition for one (in the case of the M&CR), and they demanded that they should be responsible for a reduced share of the cost of the new station. Negotiation over the issue dragged on. On 20 June 1846 the Maryport Company agreed to contribute, and to give up its Crown Street site, which was required for the approach route to the new station and for goods sidings; the Newcastle and Carlisle Railway declined to participate in the new station at all.

The L&CR persevered and obtained the Lancaster and Carlisle Railway Act 1846 (9 & 10 Vict. c. cclvii) for the station at Court Square, Citadel Station, on 27 July 1846. In concert with the Caledonian Railway, the L&CR pressed on with the construction of the station, and it opened early in September 1847. (Note: Sources differ over the date, which cannot be authoritatively stated, but it was between 1 and 10 September 1847.)

The station was built in a grand style, designed by the architect William Tite, and it remained "quite unrivalled in the whole of the North West. Victorian Tudor in style, its clock tower and lantern had on one side the nine-bay entrance arcade with elaborate buttressing and mullioned windows".

The cost of the Citadel station was supposed to be equally borne by the L&CR and the Caledonian, but the latter had seriously over-reached itself financially in search of expanding its network in Scotland, and the initial opening cost of £60,000 had been entirely funded by the L&CR. By 1854, the total cost had escalated to £178,324, and by this time the Caledonian had almost made up its fair contribution. The station had a single through platform and two bays.

On 10 May 1857 a management committee was formed, the Citadel Station Committee, jointly controlled by the Caledonian Railway and the L&CR; the station and approach track became joint property.

== George Hudson and Crown Street station ==
George Hudson, known as the Railway King, was for long a successful businessman who acquired personal control of a wide network of railways. His methods were aggressive and brutal, and were eventually exposed as shady and worse, leading to his sudden downfall in 1849. However, he managed to take a lease of the Newcastle and Carlisle Railway from 1 August 1848 and of the Maryport and Carlisle Railway from 1 October 1848. (Note: For the sake of form, Hudson arranged the leases through the York, Newcastle and Berwick Railway.)

The L&CR main line approaching Carlisle crossed the M&CR line on the level three times; the L&CR laid it out to main line standards, and understood that the Crown Street line was to be removed, and that it was in any case without legal authorisation. M&CR trains crossed the L&CR main line three times approaching Crown Street; if they ran on to London Road station, there was a fourth crossing, and the engine returning to Crown Street for servicing made a fifth crossing. This was hardly tenable in the long term and the L&CR agreed compensation of £7,005 for the M&CR to vacate Crown Street; this seemed to be acceptable to the M&CR directors. On Hudson taking control, however, he demanded £100,000, also threatening to build his own joint station near the site, further obstructing the L&CR. This went to a court of law, and the jury awarded the M&CR £7,171 for the Crown Street site, which the L&CR swiftly paid. Hudson held out and declined to hand over the site. The L&CR had the law on its side and decided not to allow further delay, and decided to take possession.

At 10 am on 17 March 1849, the Under-Sheriff of Cumberland accompanied by the L&CR solicitor, presented himself at Crown Street station and informed the M&CR clerks, that he was giving possession of the station to the L&CR. He then signalled to

a strong force of at least 100 men, armed with crow-bars, pick-axes, shovels, &c., [who] rushed from the goods yard of the Lancaster company, to which they had been brought from all parts of the line, to the ground of the Maryport Company, and, without further ceremony, commenced operation by tearing up the rails. This was the work of a few minutes only, as the men were particularly expert. They next pulled down the sheds of the coal and lime depots; and lastly, having allowed the clerks of the Maryport Company sufficient time carry off the books, they gutted the station, which was certainly only a temporary one, and carried away the building.

The dismantling of the station "was accomplished so quickly that when the next train from Maryport arrived, the driver was informed by a Lancaster Company's policeman, that it was impossible for it to back into the station. It therefore went forward to London Road [station]."

M&CR trains now all ran to London Road station only. Hudson's lease of the M&CR and the N&CR needed to be authorised by act of Parliament, and this was applied for in the 1849 parliamentary session. However, at this time Hudson's improper methods were being laid bare, and matters turned against him. His bill to authorise the lease was rejected, and the lease was void from 1 January 1850, when the N&CR and the M&CR reverted to their independent status. The M&CR continued to use London Road as its Carlisle terminus, paying the N&CR £250 per annum as rent. The Lancaster and Carlisle had got its way, although the M&CR trains (and M&CR trains to the Canal terminal) continued to cross the L&CR main line on the level, but now only once per journey.

== Glasgow and South Western Railway ==
A third trunk route was promoted at this time: its supporters noted that the Caledonian Railway route crossed the heights of the Southern Uplands and passed through few centres of population. A better route between Glasgow and Carlisle, they argued, would take a railway west of the Southern Uplands, and pass through the important towns of Paisley, Kilmarnock and Dumfries as well as several other towns, and such a route could have much easier gradients. This would be at the expense of greater mileage, and inferior connection to Edinburgh. The Glasgow, Dumfries and Carlisle Railway was incorporated on 16 July 1846. From the outset the company was desperately short of money, and the earlier intention of building through to Carlisle had been abandoned. Now the route was to join the Caledonian Railway at Gretna, and Dumfries trains would run over the Caledonian line into Carlisle. Commitment to this from the hostile Caledonian had not been secured, and the GD&CR position was weak in the extreme.

The GD&CR was also unable to build the northern section of its intended route, but that was taken up by another concern. The Glasgow, Paisley, Kilmarnock and Ayr Railway had opened its main line between Glasgow (Note: Actually from Paisley, and jointly with the Glasgow, Paisley and Greenock Railway between Glasgow and Paisley.) and Ayr in 1839–1840. It had always intended to act co-operatively with the Dumfries company, and the Ayr company was earning good profits while the Dumfries company was penniless. It was agreed that the two companies would form an end-on junction at Horsecleugh, near Cumnock, and the GD&CR would build the southern part of the route only; on completion of the through route the two companies would merge. The GD&CR opened from a temporary station at Dumfries to Gretna on 23 August 1848, but its trains could not yet run through, so a change to a Caledonian train was necessary there.

Finally on 28 October 1850 the through route was completed and the GD&CR and the Paisley company merged, forming the Glasgow and South Western Railway on the same day. It was not until 1 March 1851 that G&SWR trains were granted running powers to run through to Carlisle Citadel station, as a tenant there on a 999-year agreement. The Caledonian Railway made life as difficult as possible for the unwelcome interloper, and the Lancaster and Carlisle Railway and the Caledonian Railway together ensured that any traffic from England to central Scotland was forwarded over the Caledonian line.

== Maryport and Carlisle changes ==
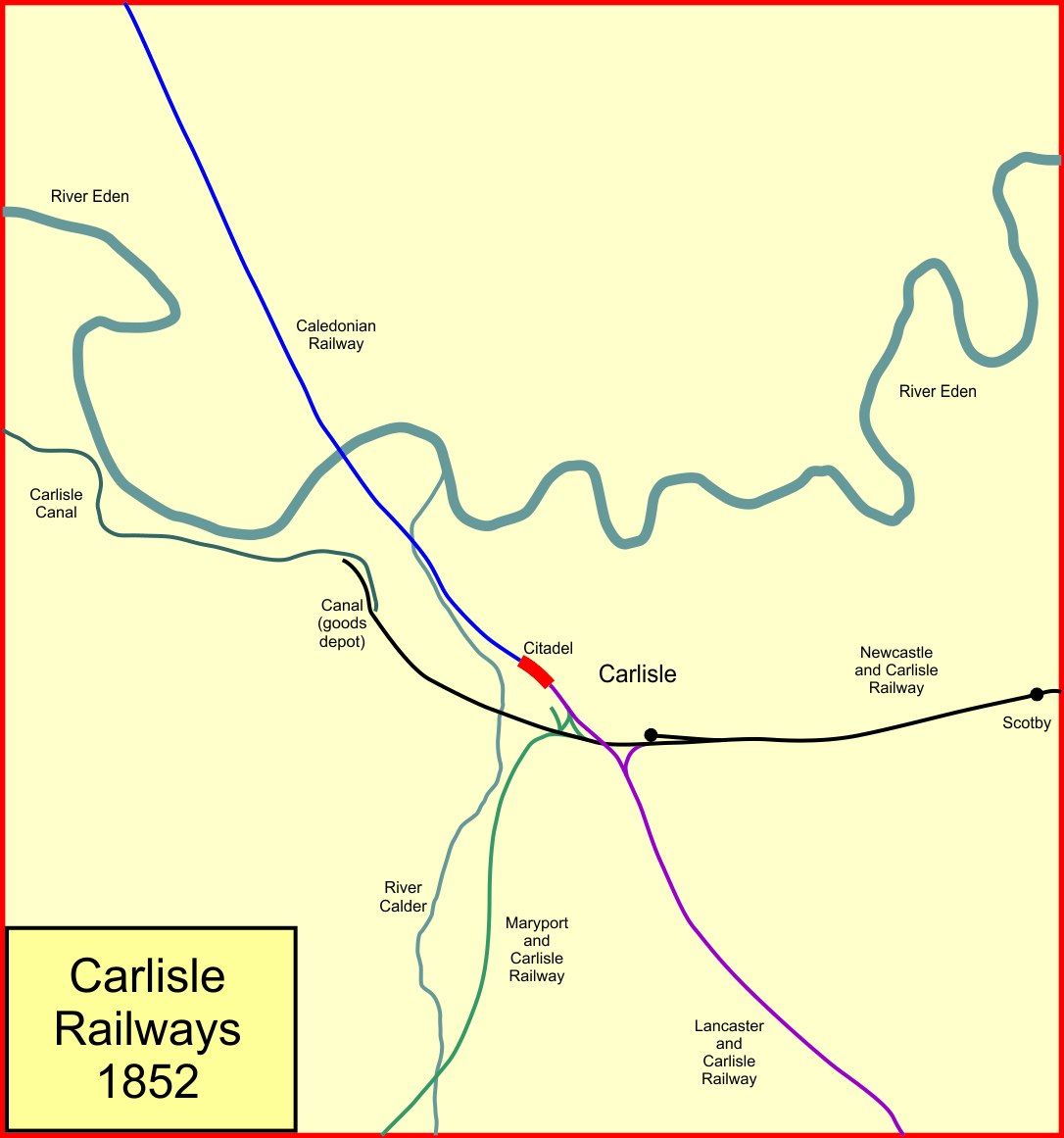
Railways of Carlisle in 1852

The Maryport and Carlisle use of London Road station was not convenient to it, and it made sense to transfer its passenger trains to Citadel station; it finalised an agreement to do so on 2 April 1851; a north-to-east spur to enable the trains to get access was laid, and from 1 June 1851 they used Citadel. This involved approaching the flat crossing of the L&CR main line and backing into the station. This was the fourth Carlisle station the M&CR had used in seven years. For the time being M&CR goods traffic continued to use London Road, but the M&CR constructed a new independent goods station, known as Bog Goods Station, in use from 1 January 1852. It was also known as Crown Street, but the site was not the same as the former terminus.

On 8 August 1852 the Maryport and Carlisle Railway opened a west-to-north curve from Forks Junction to Citadel, enabling direct access to Carlisle without reversal; from this time goods traffic also used this new connection. The new approach crossed the Canal line on the level; the M&CR were required to appoint a person to make signals at the passage of trains.

== Carlisle and Silloth Bay Railway and Dock Company ==
By 1850 the superiority of railways over canals was obvious, and railways that had been constructed to Maryport and Whitehaven took away the Carlisle Canal's trade. The proprietors decided to take advantage of the technological progress. The Carlisle Canal was reincorporated as the Port Carlisle Railway on 4 August 1853, with powers to convert the canal to a railway. The N&CR Canal terminus had adjoined the canal basin, and the new railway now made an end-on connection with the N&CR line. The Port Carlisle Railway opened to goods traffic on 22 May 1854; it established a Canal Goods Station on the site of the canal basin; the N&CR goods depot on their section of line became sidings, and exchange traffic now used the Port Carlisle Railway sidings. The Port Carlisle Railway was opened to passenger traffic from 22 June 1854 and its Canal passenger station was located just north of the junction with the N&CR. At this stage there was no passenger service eastward from the Canal station.

Unfortunately the anticipated transformation of profitability as the canal was converted to a railway failed to materialise, and the Port Carlisle Railway lost money from the outset. Part of the problem was that Port Carlisle itself was not free of navigation hazards, being so far up the river, and in view of the increasing size of shipping; moreover there was a serious problem of silting there. The solution appeared to be the creation of another rail connected harbour further west, at Silloth. Accordingly, the Carlisle and Silloth Bay Railway was incorporated on 16 July 1855 and opened 28 August 1856.

The Caledonian hoped to acquire control of the Silloth lines and on 28 June 1858 obtained the Caledonian Railway (Branch to Port Carlisle Railway) Act 1858 (21 & 22 Vict. c. lxvi) giving authority for a connecting line from its main line to Port Carlisle to get access. The short line ran from a junction later named Port Carlisle Branch Junction on the Caledonian to Port Carlisle Junction. The takeover of the Silloth lines did not take place, but the connecting line later had a strategic role.

== Citadel station committee ==
The cost of construction and maintenance of Citadel station, of operating it and the approach lines, was considerable and allocation of it to users was contentious. On 10 May 1857 the Lancaster and Carlisle Railway and the Caledonian Railway formed a Citadel Station Committee, in effect establishing a joint railway. As other users were becoming involved and as traffic increased, this arrangement was formalised by the Carlisle Citadel Station Act 1861 (24 & 25 Vict. c. clxvi) of 22 July 1861. In 1859 the Lancaster and Carlisle Railway was leased by the London and North Western Railway (effective from 22 December 1859), and that company became the joint member of the committee. (In 1879 the L&CR was fully absorbed by the LNWR.)

== North British Railway ==
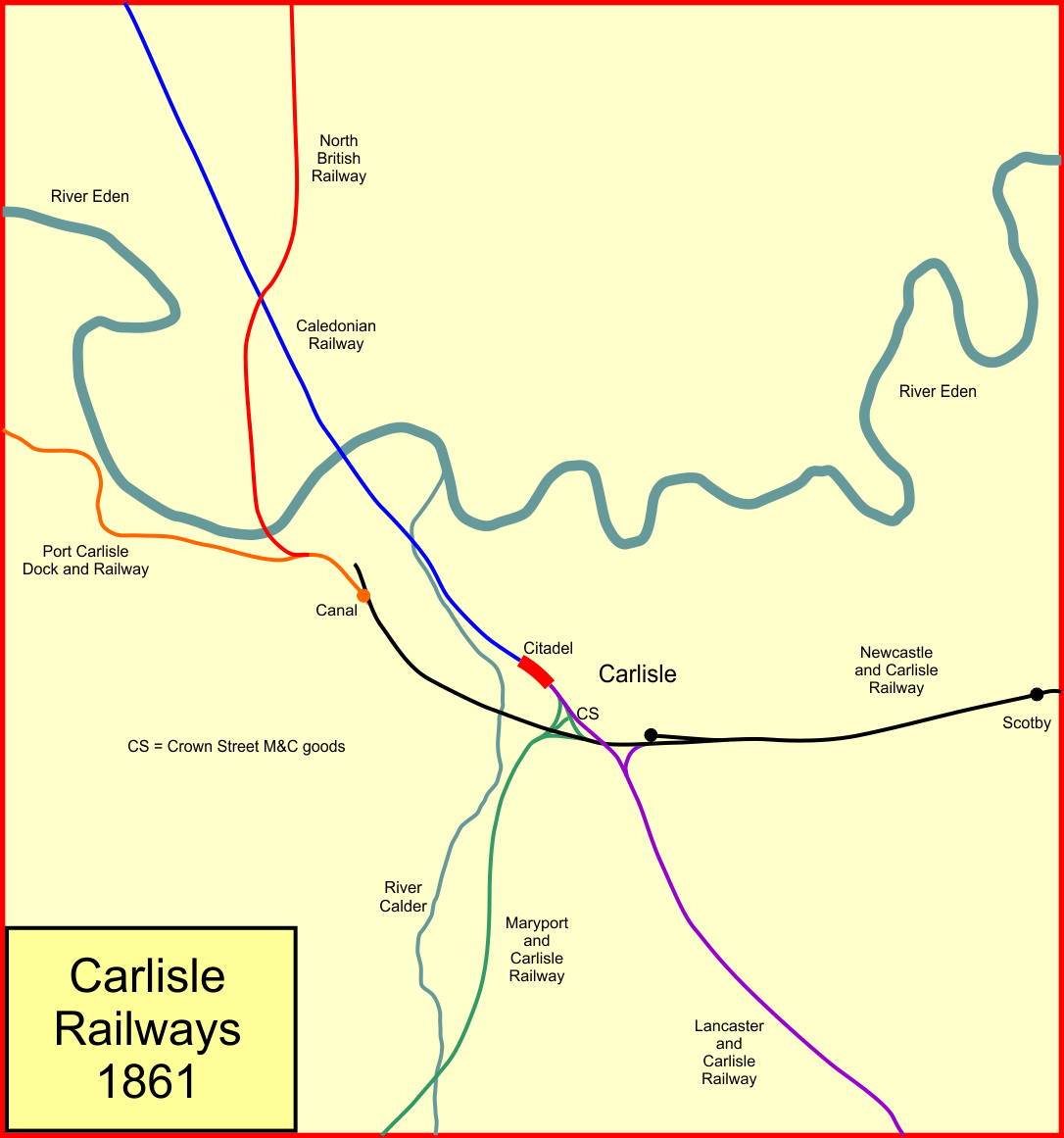
Railways of Carlisle in 1861

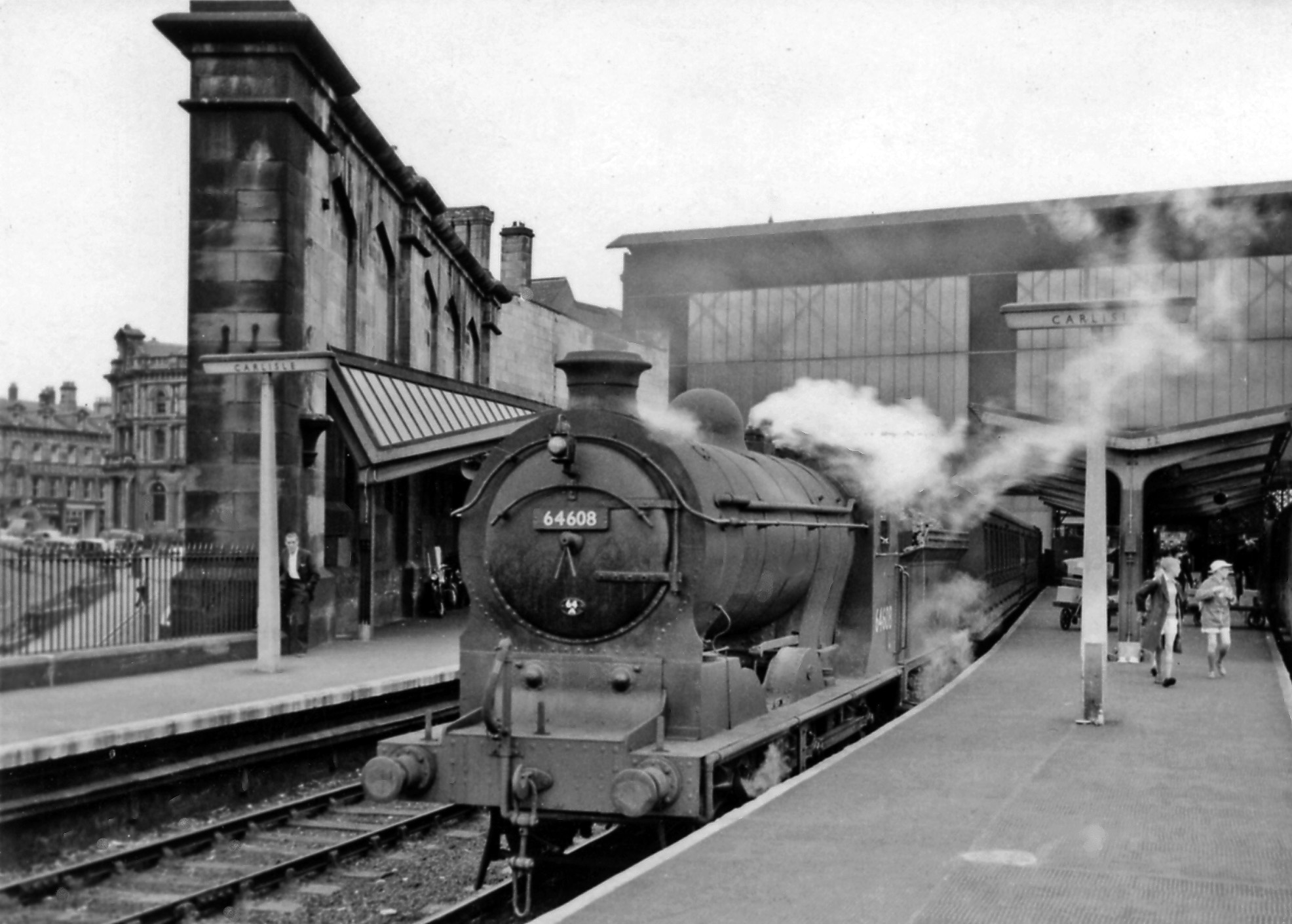
A train for Hawick on the NBR route at Carlisle

The North British Railway had been the first (by a few months) to start a passenger service from Edinburgh to connect with the English railway network at Berwick, part of the East Coast Route. The trade potential of Carlisle and its connections to west coast ports and the mineral reserves of Cumberland were attractive, and from the earliest times the NBR directors had harboured an aspiration to reach Carlisle. The NBR had reached Hawick in 1849, but 43 miles of thinly populated terrain lay between that town and Carlisle.

A difficulty had always been the actual access to Carlisle itself, as the Caledonian Railway and the London and North Western Railway (LNWR) were hostile to the incursion. The NBR had agreed a takeover arrangement with the moribund Port Carlisle Dock and Railway Company and the Carlisle and Silloth Bay Railway and Dock Company. These two lines had a Carlisle station; a connecting line to the Caledonian Railway at Carlisle Citadel station was planned, and they had a west coast port, at Silloth. On 21 July 1859 the Border Union (North British) Railways Act 1859 (22 & 23 Vict. c. xxiv) authorising the Carlisle Extension (now named the Border Union Railway) and permitting the acquisition of the Carlisle minor railways received royal assent. It specified that the line "should not be used for the purposes of undue competition with the Caledonian Railway in respect of traffic between Edinburgh and Carlisle", but it did give the NBR power to enter Citadel station, over the short connecting line to the Caledonian, authorised the previous year.

It was to be a long and lonely route from Hawick to Carlisle. The short section from Scotch Dyke (two miles north of Longtown) to Citadel station at Carlisle was ready early in October 1861. The Port Carlisle Junction connecting line had been opened on 30 June 1860 as a single line for goods transfer purposes. At this stage it emerged that the Board of Trade would not sanction opening of the NBR service unless the Caledonian Railway gave a guarantee that they would double the connecting line. This was not instantly forthcoming, and the NBR opened a goods service only from 15 October 1861; there was also a connecting goods service from Longtown to Gretna, for transfer to the G&SWR there. On 29 October 1861 the required Board of Trade sanction was given and the passenger service started operating, worked at first by the Caledonian Railway.

The whole line between Carlisle and Edinburgh was opened for goods trains on 23 June 1862 and for passengers on 1 July 1862. With an eye to marketing, the route was named The Waverley Route. The Caledonian Railway frustrated attempts by the NBR to arrange through workings, or even through bookings, for passengers, and goods traffic was diverted away from the NBR as far as possible. However, the NBR was able to make use of its connection to Silloth to forward goods by coastal shipping.

The Port Carlisle and Silloth Bay railways were leased by the NBR by the North British Railway, Port Carlisle Railway and Dock (Lease) Act 1862 (25 & 26 Vict. c. xlviii) and the North British Railway, Silloth Railway and Dock (Lease) Act 1862 (25 & 26 Vict. c. xlvii), both dated 3 June 1862; they were fully absorbed in 1880. A station named Port Carlisle Junction was opened in July 1863; located at the convergence of the Silloth line and the Waverley route, it was designed to enable passenger connections between the two systems. At this stage the Silloth trains were not permitted to use Citadel station; however agreement was reached for this and from 1 July 1864 the Silloth trains used Citadel station; both Port Carlisle Junction station and Canal station closed to passengers.

== North Eastern Railway ==
The Newcastle and Carlisle Railway was amalgamated with (in effect absorbed by) the North Eastern Railway, ratified by the North-eastern and Carlisle Railways Amalgamation Act 1862 (25 & 26 Vict. c. cxlv) of 17 July 1862. The NER negotiated access to the Citadel station at Carlisle at the same time.

== New lines at Carlisle ==
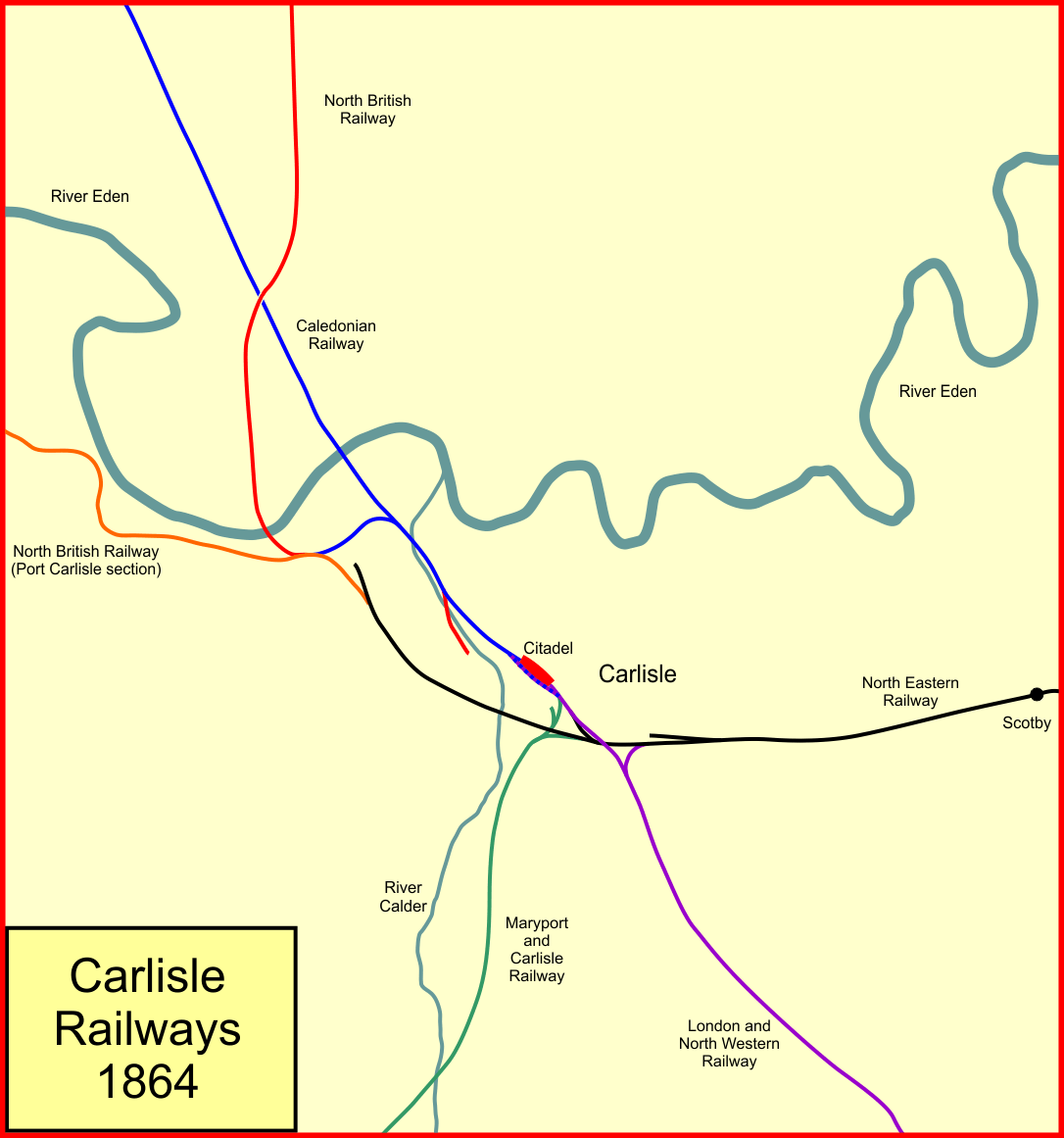
Railways of Carlisle in 1864

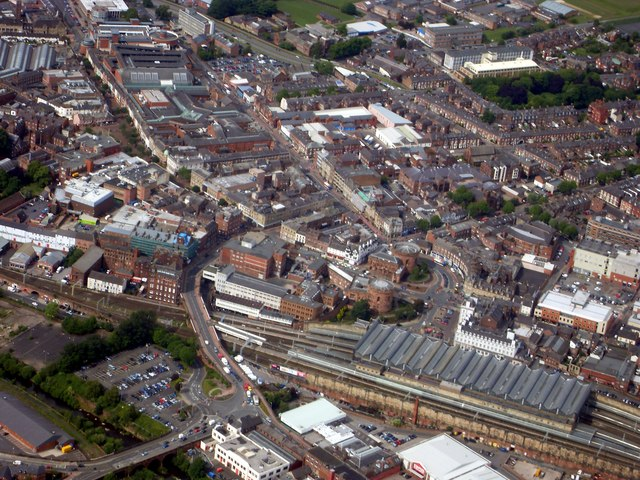
Carlisle Railway Station from the Air

The alignment of the Lancaster and Carlisle Railway route approaching Carlisle Citadel was unsatisfactory for the increasing volume and speed of main line trains, and powers were obtained in an act of Parliament on 13 August 1859 to construct a new, more direct, route to the west of the original line, from Upperby Junction northwards. It was opened for traffic on 24 January 1862. The opportunity was not taken to separate the levels, and the new line had a flat crossing with the NER Canal line at St Nicholas. The increasing traffic also resulted in serious congestion in Citadel station itself; the station handled passenger and goods traffic and was by now overwhelmed. Goods lines passing on the west side of the station (but within the station precincts) were authorised on 22 July 1861. The new goods lines were brought into use in 1862.

There was an earlier east-to-north curve at St Nicholas that had been provided for M&CR trains to back into Citadel station in 1851. From the provision of the Forks Junction curve in 1852 M&CR trains ran in direct, and the curve had been used only for turning M&CR engines on the triangle it formed. The spur needed to be relocated to make way for the new main line, and a new east-to-north curve east of the new main line was opened for use by goods traffic on 30 April 1862. It was a single line at first, and was approved for doubling on 13 June 1864.

Meanwhile, North Eastern Railway trains from the Newcastle line used it to enter Citadel station from 1 January 1863, London Road being closed to passengers at this date.

The increasing volume of traffic demanded increased accommodation for goods traffic; the North British Railway obtained powers for a goods yard at Dentonholme, on the west side of the northwards main line, on 5 July 1865. This was part of a NBR attempt to force general expansion of Citadel station's facilities in the face of the owning committee's obstruction. The wider scheme failed completely, but the goods depot, accessed from the Port Carlisle Branch, was duly opened. The following year the NBR concluded an agreement with the Midland Railway for its use of the Dentonholme site. (Note: The Midland Railway did not have a route to Carlisle at this stage, but required goods terminal facilities nonetheless.)

On 25 May 1867 the LNWR opened a new goods station on the site of the old M&CR Crown Street station; the short connecting line involved a flat crossing of the 1862 east-to-north curve now used for NER trains approaching Citadel station. The cramped St Nicholas goods station was closed at this time, but in 1871 the LNWR opened a new cattle depot on the site of the former St Nicholas goods depot, that had closed in 1867.

== Solway Junction Railway ==
The congestion in passing through Carlisle was a long running difficulty, especially during the passage of heavy and slow mineral trains. The iron ore of Cumberland was increasingly being conveyed to the Lanarkshire iron smelting industries, and considerable volumes of this traffic were passing through Carlisle.

An independent company was formed to construct a railway crossing the Solway Firth from Bowness to Annan, and connecting lines to form a short cut route from near Aspatria to Kirtlebridge on the Caledonian Railway main line. This remarkable scheme required a viaduct over a mile long crossing the Solway, and the company was authorised by the Solway Junction Railway Act 1864 (27 & 28 Vict. c. clviii) on 30 June 1864, with capital of £320,000. The line opened for mineral traffic on 13 September 1869. Some relief was provided to the Carlisle congestion, but by this time the iron industry had gone into a temporary decline, and this ruined the financial viability of the railway company.

On 30 January 1881 ice floes on the Solway at the end of an exceptionally cold spell, seriously damaged the viaduct structure, which was out of use until repairs were completed in 1884. The traffic never revived and when heavy maintenance was overdue, the viaduct and the line were closed, in 1921.

== Settle and Carlisle line ==
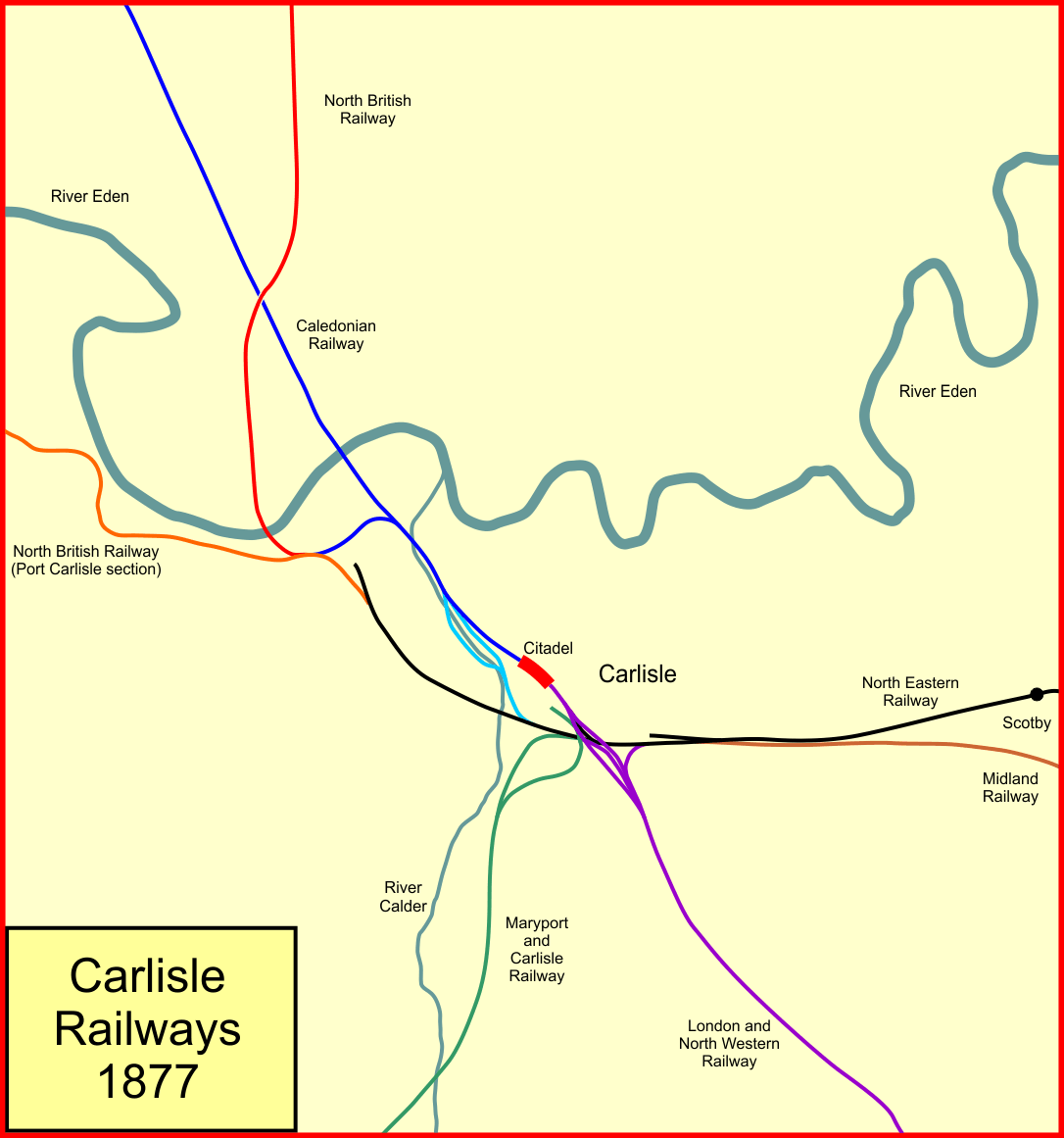
Railways of Carlisle in 1877

The Midland Railway had a large network further south, and for some time had hoped to reach Carlisle. In 1857 it reached Ingleton, and intended to run to Carlisle from there, but the Lancaster and Carlisle Railway obstructed that intention. At the same time both the North British Railway and the Glasgow and South Western Railway were expressing discontent at the obstruction at Carlisle. Both had built expensive trunk routes from the north to Carlisle, but found that the L&CR and the Caledonian Railway prevented them from operating freely through Carlisle.

The key to this eventually emerged as the Settle and Carlisle Railway, which was authorised by the Midland Railway (Settle to Carlisle) Act 1866 (29 & 30 Vict. c. ccxxiii) on 16 July. The 72-mile line was to run through mountainous and thinly populated terrain, from Settle, north of Keighley, to Carlisle. The construction was to be fearsomely difficult, crossing a summit level 1,025 feet above sea level; the Midland was to raise £1,650,000 in additional capital to pay for it. The scheme had been brought forward at a time of cheap money, but there was a slump in the financial sector, and at the end of 1867 the Midland Railway directors responded to massive shareholder disquiet, and ordered suspension of work on the new line. In the 1869 parliamentary session the Midland Railway promoted a bill to abandon the construction, but the abandonment was opposed by other interests, and the bill was lost. The Midland had to construct an expensive railway which it now wished to abandon.

On 2 (or 3) August 1875 the Settle and Carlisle line opened to goods traffic; it entered Carlisle by joining the Newcastle line at Durran Hill Junction near London Road. The following year, on 1 May 1876, the Settle and Carlisle line was fully open.

== Major improvements at Carlisle ==
=== Segregating passenger and goods traffic ===
The opening of the Settle and Carlisle Railway heralded an increase of through passenger traffic at Carlisle, and the already inadequate facilities were to be under severe strain. The Midland Railway (Settle to Carlisle) Act 1866, authorising the construction of the Settle and Carlisle line, had required the owners of Citadel station to apply to an arbitrator to determine what enlargement of the station was necessary for the additional traffic, and to submit a bill for the authorisation of the necessary works. The arbitrator was also to determine the allocation of the costs for the construction and maintenance, in the event of difficulty.

During the period between 1866 and the opening of the Settle and Carlisle line, there were abortive proposals to proceed with the improvement of Citadel station area, and the "difficulty" foreseen in the S&C bill took the form of persistent obstruction by the LNWR and the Caledonian, and the Board of Trade itself finally appointed an arbitrator, Joseph Cubitt, to make the necessary determination. Unfortunately the arbitrator died before completing his work, and the situation proved so frustrating that the Midland presented its own Citadel Station Bill in an attempt to get a proper allocation fixed. The bill failed, but the LNWR and Caledonian were motivated to negotiate with the Midland and they made a voluntary agreement, on 16 December 1872. This resulted in the Carlisle Citadel Station Act 1873 (36 & 37 Vict. c. clxxxvii) of 21 July.

This was a far-reaching project: a new route taking goods traffic away from Citadel was to be constructed, and the existing goods lines at Citadel were to be removed, the space being used for improved passenger train accommodation.

=== The passenger station ===
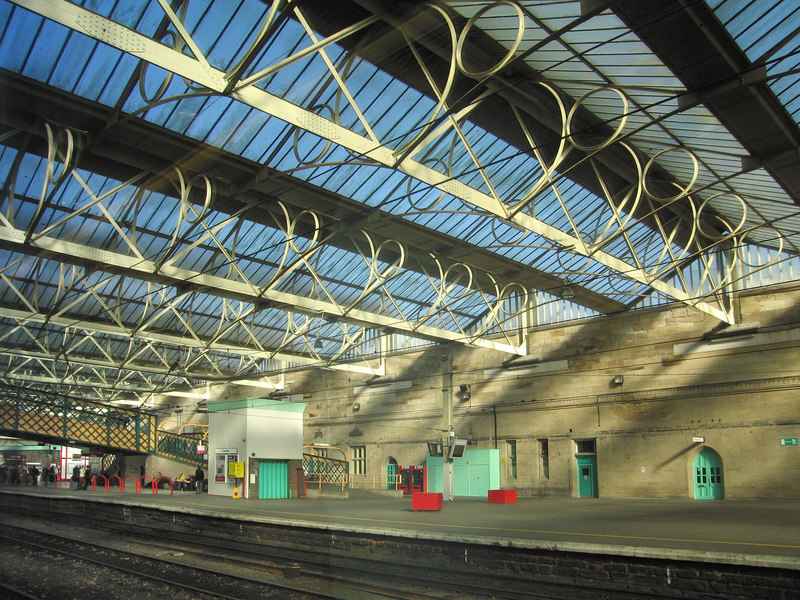
The roof of Carlisle station

The £334,000 cost of the project was to be paid for by the Midland Railway and the Citadel Committee jointly. The passenger station was massively expanded with a long new island platform and five bay platforms; the glass roof covered 6 1/2 acres, and there was an elegant end screen in a gothic style. However, this only provided three through platforms, a fact that limited express passenger train operation, especially in an era when many trains attached and detached portions for multiple destinations, in some cases changing from vacuum to Westinghouse braking on the trains. It was at one time commonplace for a succession of down trains to be held up outside waiting platforms when no up trains were in evidence. Although not fully complete, the new station was inaugurated on 4 July 1880 for the Carlisle Royal Show.

Although the three through platforms were long, they were a limitation on traffic. In 1907 R. E. Charlewood recorded that

"To accommodate all [the] traffic, the space at Carlisle is very limited ... There are only three main line platform faces... Fortunately, the main platforms are long enough to admit of two trains being dealt with simultaneously."

The start of the grouse season in 1900 occasioned exceptional traffic flows:

On the night of August 10th, thirteen Scotch expresses left Euston and over 300 beds were made up in the trains for first class tourists only. The first portion of the 7.45 pm was filled with first class passengers, all for the Highland Railway via Dunkeld. The second portion was also for the Highland line only. Next train to leave was the first portion of the 8 pm, all of which was for Aberdeen. This express created a record by reaching Carlisle at 2.12 am, exactly at time – a feat never before accomplished on any August 10th. The second portion of the same train was for Aberdeen and Oban. Ten minutes later followed the Stranraer boat [train] express, close on the heels of which ran the special horse and carriage train for all parts of Scotland. The express leaving at 8.50 pm was for Glasgow (Central) only. Ten minutes afterwards followed a heavy train for Edinburgh only, with a second portion labelled for the north. Last of all came the fastest train on the West Coast route: the 11.50 pm in two portions, the first bound for Glasgow and the second for Edinburgh and the north. Nearly all these trains were made up equal to 19 1/2 vehicles, but although the weight was so great and the time between each none too long, wonderful time was kept to Carlisle.

The ordinary passenger train service was described:

"Under ordinary circumstances and exclusive of special trains the number of trains dealt with each weekday at the Citadel station is as follows:

- London and North Western 61
- Caledonian 45
- Midland 35
- Glasgow and South Western 32
- North British 34
- North Eastern 36
- Maryport and Carlisle 16
- Total 259."

=== Goods routes ===
The goods by-pass lines were to be controlled by a new Carlisle Goods Traffic Committee, consisting of members of the LNWR, the Caledonian Railway, the Midland Railway, and the G&SWR. (The G&SWR did not fully participate in the controlling committee for some time.)

The Caledonian Railway goods depot was modernised and fully relocated to the west of the realigned northward main line, and new engine sheds were built at Kingmoor.

The G&SWR and the North British Railway saw themselves as allies of the Midland Railway, and they aligned their operating facilities at Carlisle to that company. The G&SWR used new goods facilities and engine accommodation at Petteril, opposite London Road, from the beginning of 1875, but some through goods traffic from the Midland was exchanged at Gretna Green (G&SWR). A new connection was made from London Road through to the M&CR and the Canal line, by lowering and realigning the old N&CR Canal branch; this enabled NBR, NER and Midland goods traffic to run through, and incidentally forming a triangular junction, available from 7 July 1877. The former L&CR main line was again realigned and elevated to pass over these lines, so that full grade separation was at last achieved, and all the companies had access to and from the new goods route, from 6 August 1877.

The new goods lines were primarily through routes, and thought now turned to joint goods terminal facilities. In 1866 the NBR had established its Dentonholme goods depot and opened it to the Midland Railway, although the Settle and Carlisle Line was not yet nearing readiness. On 13 July 1876 the NBR obtained the North British Railway (Additional Powers) Act 1876 (39 & 40 Vict. c. cxxxiv) authorising both the Midland Railway and the G&SWR to use the site, which was to be enlarged; the new goods by-pass lines now passed alongside. The much enlarged joint goods depot at Dentonholme was opened on 1 October 1883. (Note: Jowett consistently refers to the location as "Dentholme" throughout the detailed and extensive section on Carlisle, but this is a mistake.) In fact the NBR continued to use Canal as its primary goods depot, and the G&SWR was the chief beneficiary of the new facility. The multiple goods depot locations in the city resulted in a huge volume of inefficient transfer trip working traffic.

== Currock engine shed G&SWR ==
The G&SWR had been provided with engine shed facilities at Petteril by its ally, the Midland Railway. In December 1894 it opened a new engine shed of its own at Currock, opposite the Maryport and Carlisle shed. It needed running powers over the M&CR to reach it, and these were formalised on 6 July 1895.

== World War I and the Grouping ==
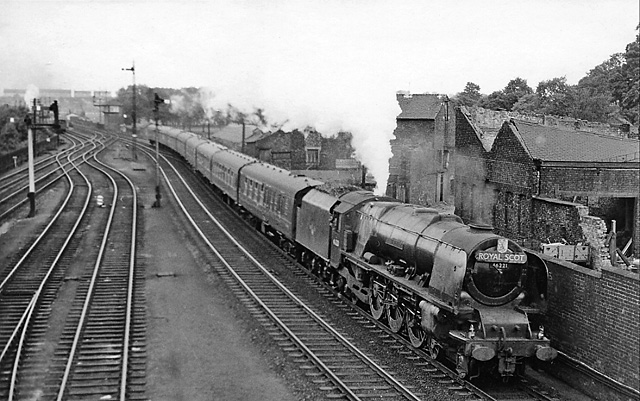
The up Royal Scot approaching Carlisle in 1960

The advent of World War I (1914–1918) resulted in a huge upsurge in goods traffic at Carlisle, and the dispersed goods depots of the individual companies resulted in heavy traffic in trip workings between them. Some beneficial co-ordination was achieved by a (goods traffic) Joint Control Committee from 1916.

After the war, the main line railways of Great Britain were "grouped" following the Railways Act 1921. At the beginning of 1923, four large companies were established and most of the prior independent companies were allocated into one of the groups. The London Midland and Scottish Railway (LMS) was the dominant group at Carlisle, and the LNWR, the Caledonian Railway, the Midland and the G&SWR were constituents of it. The Maryport and Carlisle Railway became part of the LMS as a subsidiary. The London and North Eastern Railway (LNER) was dominant on the East Coast Main Line, and the NER and North British Railway were constituents of the LNER, and the Carlisle and Silloth Bay lines followed.

A divided control at Carlisle therefore continued, but some limited rationalisation was possible. The M&CR engine shed at Currock closed in 1923, with that line's engines being serviced at the 1894 G&SWR shed; this in turn was closed in 1924, with Kingmoor and Upperby engine sheds taking over the role. London Road engine shed continued to serve the Newcastle line until 1933 when that role was transferred to Canal shed, and the Midland Railway engine shed at Durran Hill (at the convergence of the Settle and Carlisle line with the Newcastle line) closed on 16 February 1936.

== World War II and nationalisation ==
World War II (1939–1945) again brought a massive upsurge in goods traffic, and the unmodernised network of routes at Carlisle again brought serious operational difficulties. The Durran Hill engine shed, closed in 1936, was reopened, later closing finally on 2 December 1959. Carlisle Kingmoor Marshalling Yard for up trains had developed at Kingmoor, north of Carlisle, and together with the traffic from the Canal lines there was intensive and congested train working at the northern end of Carlisle station complex. In 1943 quadruple track was provided from Kingmoor, where an up marshalling yard had been established, to Port Carlisle branch junction, from where there was already quadruple track to Caldew Junction.

In 1948 the main line railways of Great Britain were nationalised, following the Transport Act 1947. A Scottish Region was created, managing most of the lines in Scotland, as well as a London Midland Region covering the English (and Welsh) parts of the LMS, and an Eastern Region for the former LNER in England. In fact the apparently simple geographical split brought numerous management inconsistencies, and a number of adjustments were subsequently made. Nevertheless, Carlisle remained a border railway location for some time.

== Modernisation ==
=== Kingmoor Yard ===
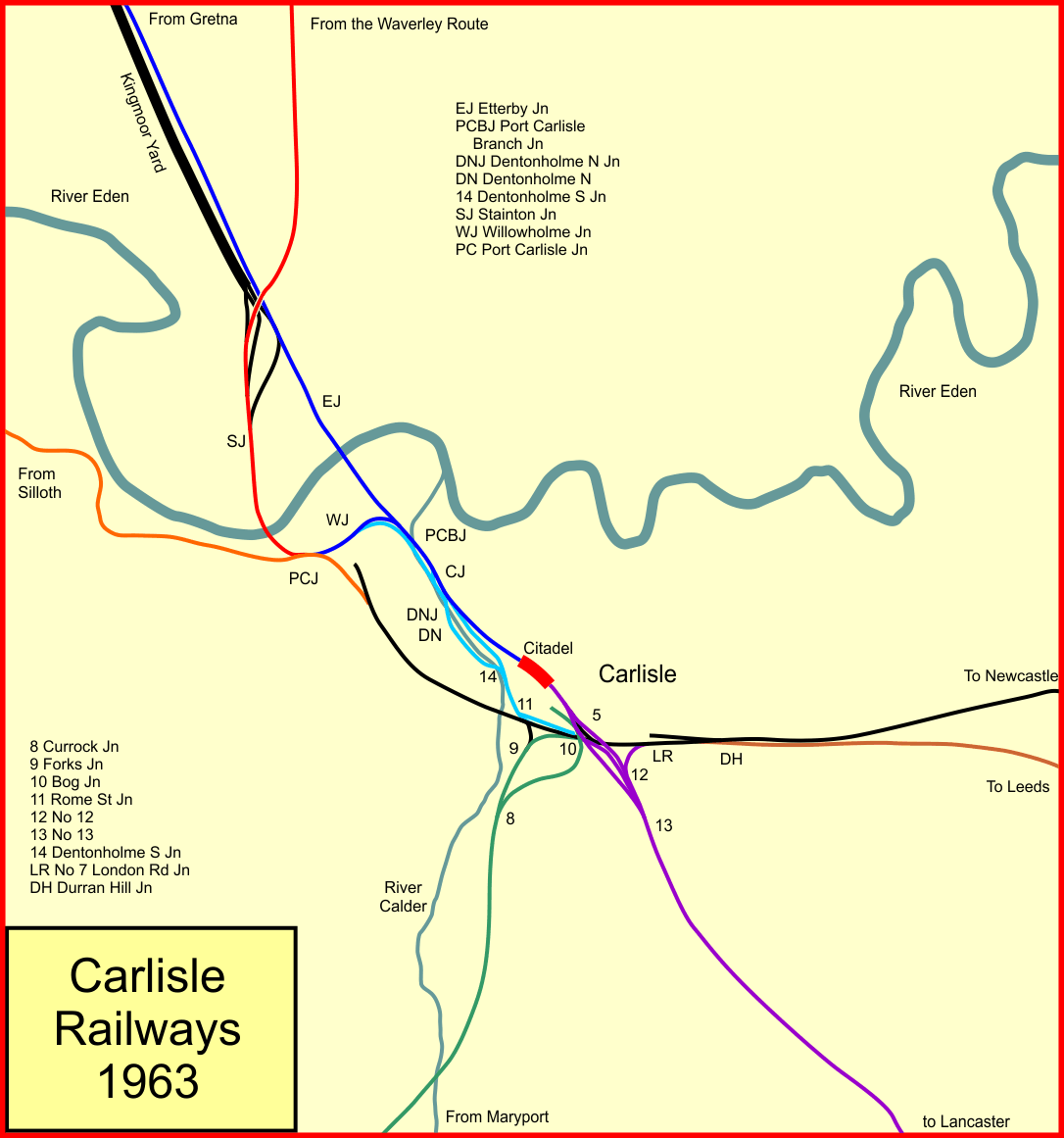
Railways of Carlisle in 1963

The return of peace and the enthusiasm of state ownership focused attention on the goods train working at Carlisle. The multiple goods stations persisted, and goods wagons passing through Carlisle were remarshalled at least once in the transit at primitive depots not much changed since 1877; in most cases through wagons were tripped between goods yards laid out by the pre-1923 companies. 30,000 wagons were passing through every week at this period.

In 1956 funding was allocated for a new integrated marshalling yard at Kingmoor, north of Carlisle. Considerable land acquisition—420 acres—took place and in 1959 actual construction started. The scheme was to cost £4.5 million, and 56 track miles of sidings were laid out. The site was 2 1/2 miles long. Separate up and down hump yards were provided and a new power signal box was built, as well as a new motive power depot.

The marshalling yard was located north of Carlisle on the west (down) side of the main line, and special arrangements were built to route goods trains to and from the yard.

Quadruple track already existed approaching Rockcliffe, at the north end of the site, and a new flyover was built to carry the up goods line (from the Gretna direction) over the main line to enter the yard. The Waverley Route crossed the former Caledonian Railway main line south of the yard, so approaching goods trains on that line were brought to the former Caledonian line over the old Gretna branch. This line, from Longtown to Gretna, originally intended to give the NBR access to the G&SWR, had been closed to passenger trains on 8 August 1915 and only carried occasional goods traffic to ordnance depots. It was altered to operate in the up direction only, and the north facing connection at Gretna was altered to be south facing, joining at Mossband Junction, from where up Waverly Line goods trains could continue on the up goods line to Kingmoor.

Southbound trains leaving the new yard entered the Dentonholme route at Caldew Junction, giving access to all southward routes.

Northbound goods trains could enter the yard by the same route, and could leave it by joining the former Caledonian main line at the north end of Kingmoor yard. The access towards the Waverley route was more complex. Trains drew southward from the yard to a reversing loop at Stainton Junction, alongside the NBR route; after the engine ran round, the train could proceed directly on the NBR line, crossing the Caledonian main line by the original bridge.

These works were completed in 1963.

=== Citadel station retrenchment ===
In 1958 the cost of maintenance of the elegant and extensive roof at Citadel station was a cause for concern, and much of the roof, and also the Gothic end screens, were removed.

=== The Beeching report ===
In 1963 the Beeching report was published, The Reshaping of British Railways. The industry had been incurring mounting losses, considered by Government to be unsustainable, and the report indicated how matters might be got under control. Many rural branch lines, and many stations on main lines, were stated to be unremunerative, and were to be closed. Wagonload goods traffic over the whole system was considered to be heavily loss-making and was to be reduced in extent. Sundries traffic was especially unremunerative. Investment was to be concentrated on certain main routes, on accelerating the transition to modern traction and signalling systems, and the introduction of "liner trains" capable of fast transits carrying maritime containers.

Many sections of the public objected to the implications of the proposals as they emerged, but Government was generally insistent on implementing the changes. Wagonload goods had been conveyed in traditional ten-feet wheelbase wagons, in many cases without a continuous brake, and staged from one marshalling yard to another. The improving road network in the country, and the regulated railway freight charges, encouraged effective competition for the business from road hauliers; railway wagonload goods had been declining since the 1930s, and now declined steeply, due not to the Beeching report, but to customers' abandonment of the railway.

=== Closures ===
The steep decline of wagonload goods traffic meant that Kingmoor Yard never worked at peak volume. The multiple goods terminals at Carlisle, still not rationalised, began to be closed due to loss of business. On 2 August 1965 Viaduct goods, the former Caledonian Railway goods depot, was closed, followed in July 1965 by Crown Street goods. (Note: The official closure date was 1 February 1966 but the track had been lifted at the earlier date.) On 1 February 1966 the Midland Railway yard at Petteril Bridge goods closed, although some private sidings were retained there.

On 7 September 1964 the Silloth branch closed completely. In 1968 the southward spur from Forks Junction to Bog Junction was closed.

On 6 January 1969 the Waverley Route closed to through traffic, together with the connecting spur from Port Carlisle Branch Junction to Canal Junction, and the line to the reversing siding at Stainton Junction for trains from Kingmoor Yard; the last named was only six years old. The portion of the Waverley route as far as Longtown was retained until 31 August 1970, when the line was shortened to serve only RAF Brunthill, just north of the bridge where the Waverley Route had crossing the Caledonian, main line. The line between Mossband Junction and Bush-on-Esk, on the old Longtown to Gretna line, was retained for the time being to serve an ordnance depot, reverting to two-way working for the purpose.

In addition in 1970 the Canal branch closed, Canal goods having closed on 31 May 1969; the M&CR yard at Bog goods closed on 5 October 1970; on 7 December 1970 the LNWRcattle depot at the Crown Street site closed.

=== Resignalling ===
If the "modernisation" seemed to concentrate on closing facilities, a major step forward was the resignalling of the Carlisle station area with a modern power signal box early in 1973. 74 route miles of the West Coast Main Line were taken into its control area, together with stubs to fringe signal boxes on many branches. The Bog Junction to Forks Junction route was reinstated as part of this work, to handle steel block trains between Workington and Tyne Yard.

=== Electrification ===
A major positive element of modernisation was electrification of the main line. This was completed in 1974, on the 25 kV ac overhead system. Considerable improvements in journey times were achieved.

All wiring north of Oxenholme was completed by June 1973; from 7 January 1974 freight trains were electrically hauled between Kingmoor Yard and Mossend Yard, in central Scotland. The line south of Carlisle was energised on 25 March 1974, and some passenger trains were electrically hauled throughout from London to Glasgow from 22 April 1974. The full electric service started on 6 May 1974.

=== Kingmoor yard: further decline ===
In 1973 Kingmoor Down Yard closed. In 1977 British Rail introduced a new wagonload network named Speedlink. Modern wagons capable of 75 mph running worked in a timetabled network, but the network was much reduced; the traditional wagons were phased out, and in 1981 hump shunting at the remaining yard was discontinued.

== Derailment and closure of the goods route ==
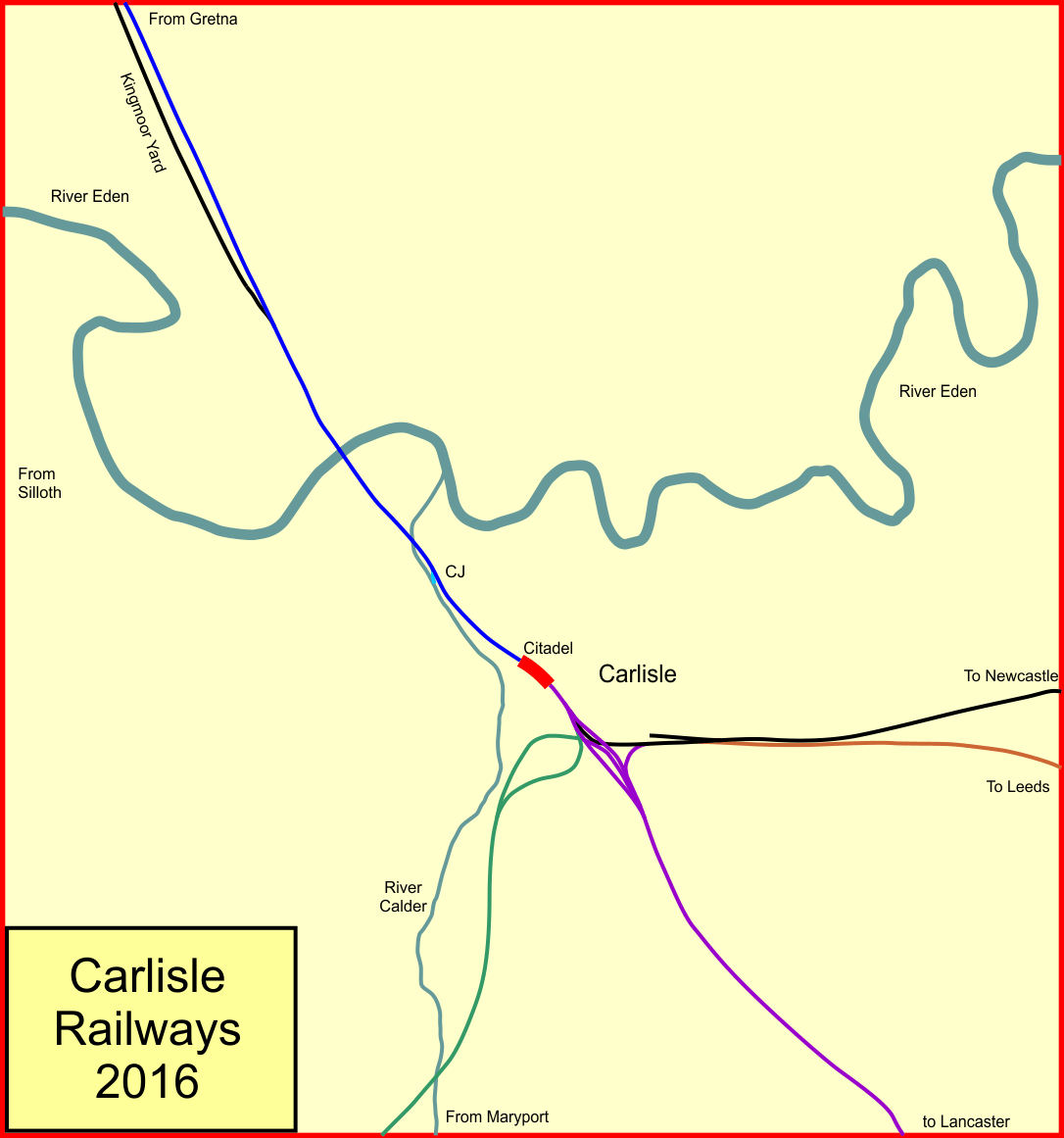
Railways of Carlisle in 2016

Early in the morning of 1 May 1984 a freightliner train was descending from Shap on the main line, and became divided. The front portion of the train continued, but the rear portion slowed but then also continued by gravity. Entering the Carlisle complex it was diverted on to the goods avoiding lines. These were sharply curved and the train portion became derailed, causing considerable damage in the process. The route was closed by the damage caused, and in December 1985 the decision was taken not to restore the route, and accordingly it was permanently closed. Signalling changes at Carlisle station were made to facilitate all traffic passing through it.

== Passenger revival ==
In the period following publication of the Beeching report, passenger train services were in constant decline for many years. The process was reversed from about 1990, and intercity and medium distance passenger services have seen a renaissance. Avanti West Coast operate services from London Euston to Edinburgh and Glasgow, while TransPennine Express operates services from Manchester Airport to Edinburgh and Glasgow.

Abellio ScotRail operates an approximately two-hourly service on the former G&SWR route to Glasgow via Dumfries and Kilmarnock. Northern Trains operate an approximately hourly service from Carlisle to Newcastle; some of the services are actually operated by Abellio ScotRail as through services from the Dumfries route. Northern operate an irregular but about 90-minutely service from Carlisle to Barrow-in-Furness via Maryport and Whitehaven.
