= Bonshaw Tower =

Architectural structure in Dumfries and Galloway, Scotland

Coordinates: 55.0376°N 3.1875°W

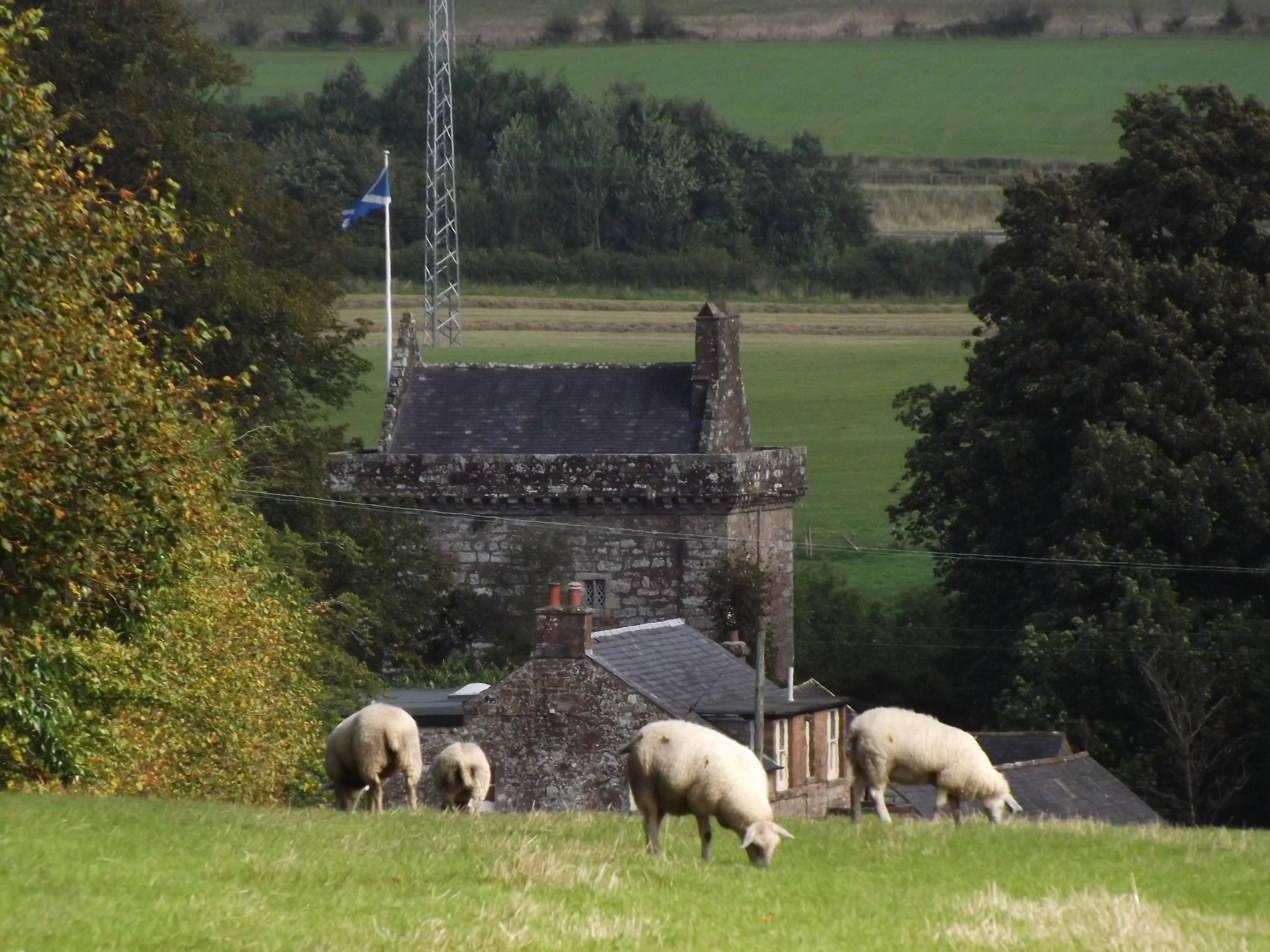
- The tower in 2013
- Interactive map of the Bonshaw Tower area
- Former names: Boneschaw

General information
- Status: Habitable / occupied
- Type: Tower house
- Architectural style: Tower house (oblong plan)
- Classification: Category A listed
- Location: One mile south of Kirtlebridge, above the Kirtle Water, Dumfries and Galloway, Scotland
- Year built: Mid-16th century (c. 1570)
- Renovated: Additions 1841/1842; linked to house 1896; parapet wall rebuilt 1895
- Owner: Irving family (Irvings of Bonshaw)

Technical details
- Material: Stone
- Floor count: Three storeys and a garret

Design and construction
- Designations: Category A listed (since 1971)
- Known for: Ancient seat of Clan Irving

Website
- bonshaw.org

Bonshaw Tower is an oblong tower house, probably dating from the mid-16th century, one mile south of Kirtlebridge, Dumfries and Galloway, Scotland, above the Kirtle Water. It is adjacent to a 19th-century mansion. The tower was one of a number of structures built along the Scottish border in the 1500s as protection against incursions by the English.

== History ==
Bonshaw, one of the ancient Irving border towers, was owned for centuries by the Irvings of Bonshaw; it was the family seat in an unbroken succession. That ended in 1954, on the death of Sir Robert Beaufin Irving, a former captain of RMS Queen Mary. Bonshaw passed to Sir Robert's nephew, Commander G. R. I. Irving RN, who sold it to a descendant of the Irvings of Wysebie. In subsequent years, it was purchased by "a junior line within the Irvings of Gribton & Dumfries, a distant branch of the Irvings of Bonshaw", according to the Clan Irving web site.

Historical summaries indicates that the tower was built ca. 1570 and was burned and then blown up by the English in the same century, but was later rebuilt. Records discuss several battles in and around the property during that century. The two-story house attached to the tower was built c.1770 but was increased in size starting in the 1840s, according to The Castles of Scotland. King James VI visited Bonshaw, in 1601 or 1602 when it was known as "Boneschaw".

Historical records also speak of an earlier Bonshaw Tower, in 1298, for example, when Robert the Bruce took refuge there; the owner at the time was shown as Sir William de Irving.

A travelogue from 1873 discusses the seat of the Clan, a very well preserved tower and a "plain, modern house, built during the last century".

After retiring as Commodore of the Cunard-White Star Line, Captain Sir Robert Beaufin Irving, Chief of Clan Irving, lived in the Tower from 1944 until his death in 1954.

The property has been Category-A listed since 1971, as a tower house with courtyard walls. The listing indicates that the tower was probably built in the mid 1500s, with additions in 1841/1842. In 1896, the tower was linked to the house with a "low corridor". The "crenellated low wall" was rebuilt in 1895, although earlier repairs were apparent, through the use of stones from the 16th and 17th century.

By the 21st century, the property was still owned by members of the Irving family and was the family home. However, the tower and/or the gardens were available as a venue for weddings and other events.

== Structure ==
The castle, which is habitable, has three storeys, and a garret, with crow-stepped gables, within a parapet. The north-facing former attic light is now used as an open belfry.

Inside a modern porch is the entrance door, with the motto SOLI DEO HONOR ET GLORIA above. There is a monogrammed pendant boss within the doorway. A vaulted entrance passage in the thickness of the wall leads to a vaulted basement. Each wall has a splayed shot-hole. The south-west angle contains a windowless dungeon, with a ventilation flue. There is a hatch in the vaulting to the first-floor Hall. From the north-east angle of the cellar a turnpike stair leads to all storeys of the tower.

The hall has a wide fireplace and four windows. There are two aumbries in the jambs while a third aumbry has an ogival lintel.

The bedroom, on the second floor, has a wall press and a garderobe. One of its four windows is high in the wall.

There is a machicolated opening about each embrasure of the parapet, which is drained by gargoyled cannon-spouts. The present pitched slate roof was installed in the early 19th century, as the flagstones of the original roof were removed to floor a farmhouse.
