= Robert Irving (naval officer) =

Scottish officer (1877–1954)

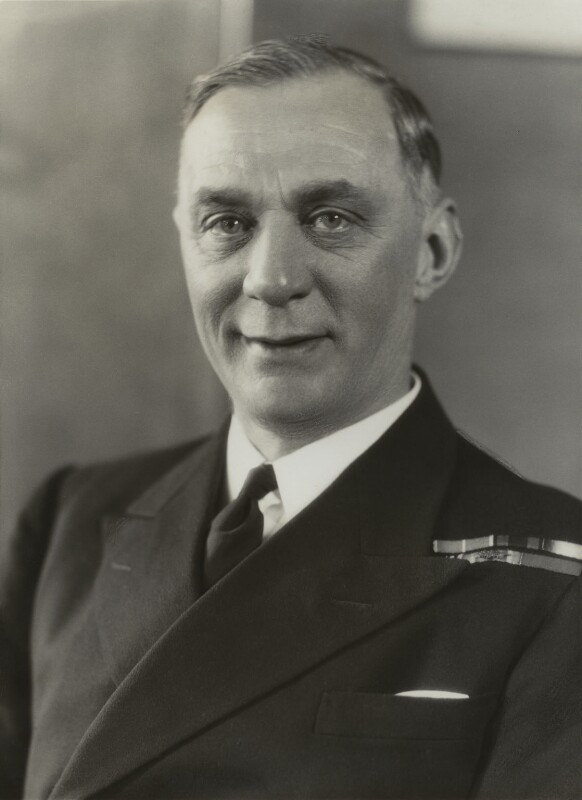
Irving in 1938

Captain Sir Robert Beaufin Irving OBE (16 July 1877 – 28 December 1954) was a Scottish officer of the Royal Naval Reserve and the British Merchant Navy.

He became Chief of Clan Irving and ended his naval career as Commodore of the Cunard-White Star Line.

== Early life ==
The son of Colonel John Beaufin Irving, of Kirtlebridge, Dumfriesshire, Irving was born in 1877 and educated at Fulland's College, Taunton, Ashborne Grammar School, and HMS Conway, in which he trained as a cadet from 1891 to 1895 and was a contemporary of John Masefield. In 1895 he became a midshipman in the Royal Naval Reserve. In 1901 he was promoted to Sub-Lieutenant, R.N.R., and in 1909 to Lieutenant.

== Career ==
In 1904 Irving joined the Cunard Line as a fourth officer in the Veria. He went on to serve in the ships Caronia, Umbria, Lucania, Carpathia, Lusitania, Carmania, Ivernia, and Brescia, and in 1913 he was appointed as chief officer in RMS Lusitania.

In August 1914, at the beginning of what became the First World War, Irving volunteered to transfer to the Royal Navy. He was posted to the light cruiser HMS Yarmouth and saw active service at the Battle of Jutland, when he was mentioned in dispatches. During the war he was promoted to Commander, R.N.R. In the Mediterranean theatre of the war, he was naval transport officer in charge of landing military stores on the coast of Palestine, and in July 1919 he was appointed OBE in recognition of that work.

Irving's next post was as staff captain in the Mauretania, and then he gained his first command, as master of the Vennonia. Later commands were the ships Samaria, Ascania, Laconia, Franconia, Scythia, and Aquitania. In 1932 he was appointed as the R.N.R. aide-de-camp to King George V.

In 1937, Irving succeeded Captain R. V. Peel as captain of the almost new Queen Mary, in service only since May 1936, and in 1938 he was appointed as Commodore of the Cunard White Star fleet.

In August 1938, Irving took the Blue Riband from the French liner Normandie when he brought the Queen Mary over the Atlantic from east to west in three days, 21 hours, and 48 minutes, beating the previous trans-Atlantic speed record.

On 18 October 1938, Irving was acclaimed for his seamanship when he successfully docked the Queen Mary without the help of tugboats, as the tug-men were on strike. He used only his skill as a master mariner and two men in a rowing boat to get his ship into the North River pier on 50th Street. He later said he had been praying to Saint Christopher.

Irving was knighted in the 1943 Birthday Honours.

== Retirement ==
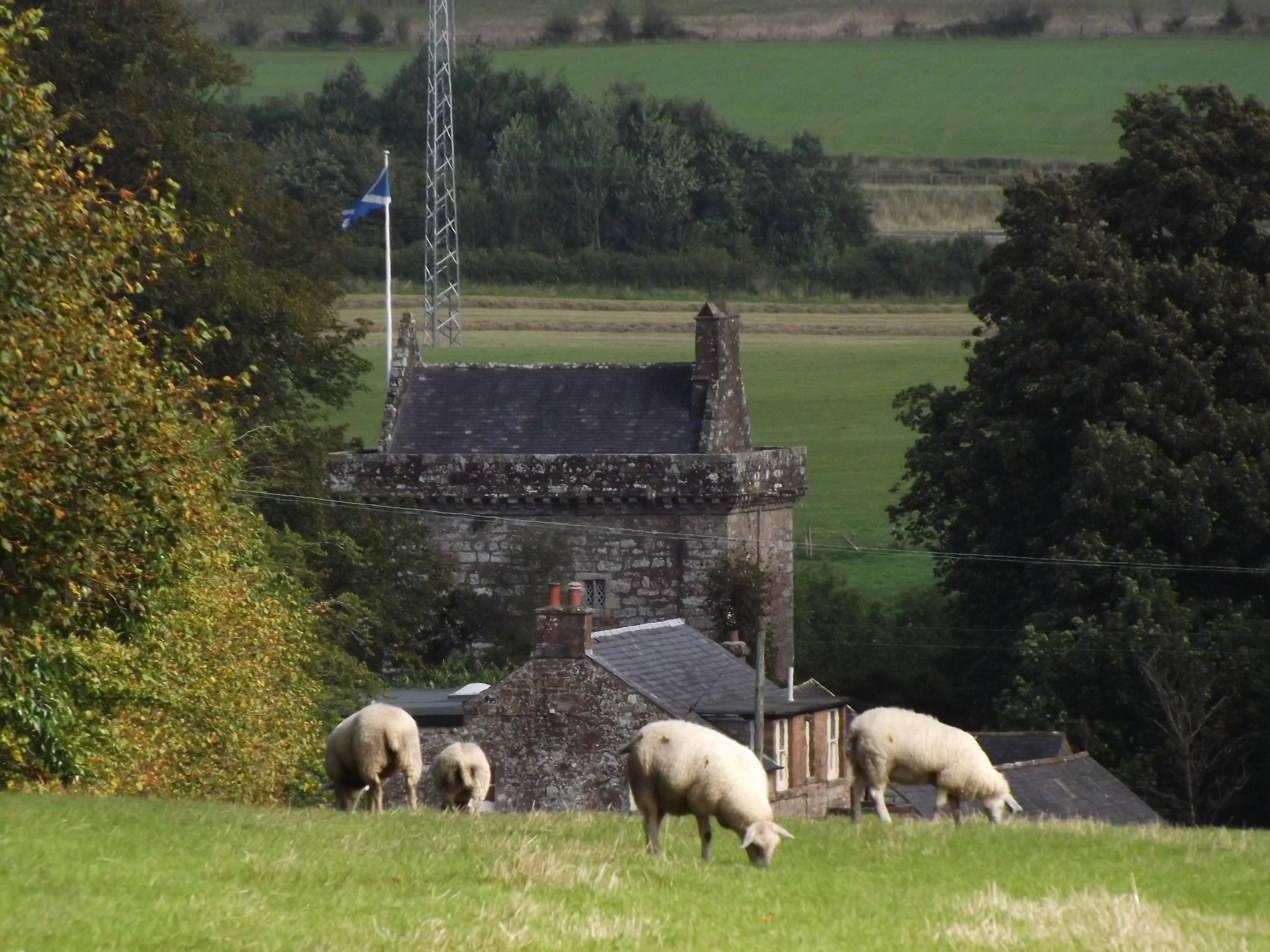
Bonshaw Tower

In 1944 Irving retired to his ancestral home, Bonshaw Tower, a tower house at Kirtlebridge. For centuries it had been the home of the Irvings of Bonshaw, of which clan he was by then Chief. In about 1944, Irving sold part of the Bonshaw estate in the parish of Annan.

Irving's time in retirement was spent on local affairs and in working for ex-service organizations. In 1946, he was appointed as a justice of the peace for Dumfriesshire and in 1947 as a deputy lieutenant, an assistant to Sir Hugh Gladstone, Lord Lieutenant of the county.

== Personal life ==
In 1902, Irving married Florence, a daughter of Joseph Brown, of Claughton, Cheshire, and they were still together when he died in December 1954 in a nursing home in Carlisle.

Irving left no children, and the Bonshaw estate was inherited by his nephew Commander George Irving RN, who sold it to a distant relation.
