= Bruce's Cave =

Cave in Dumfries and Galloway, Scotland

- Dunskellie Grotto
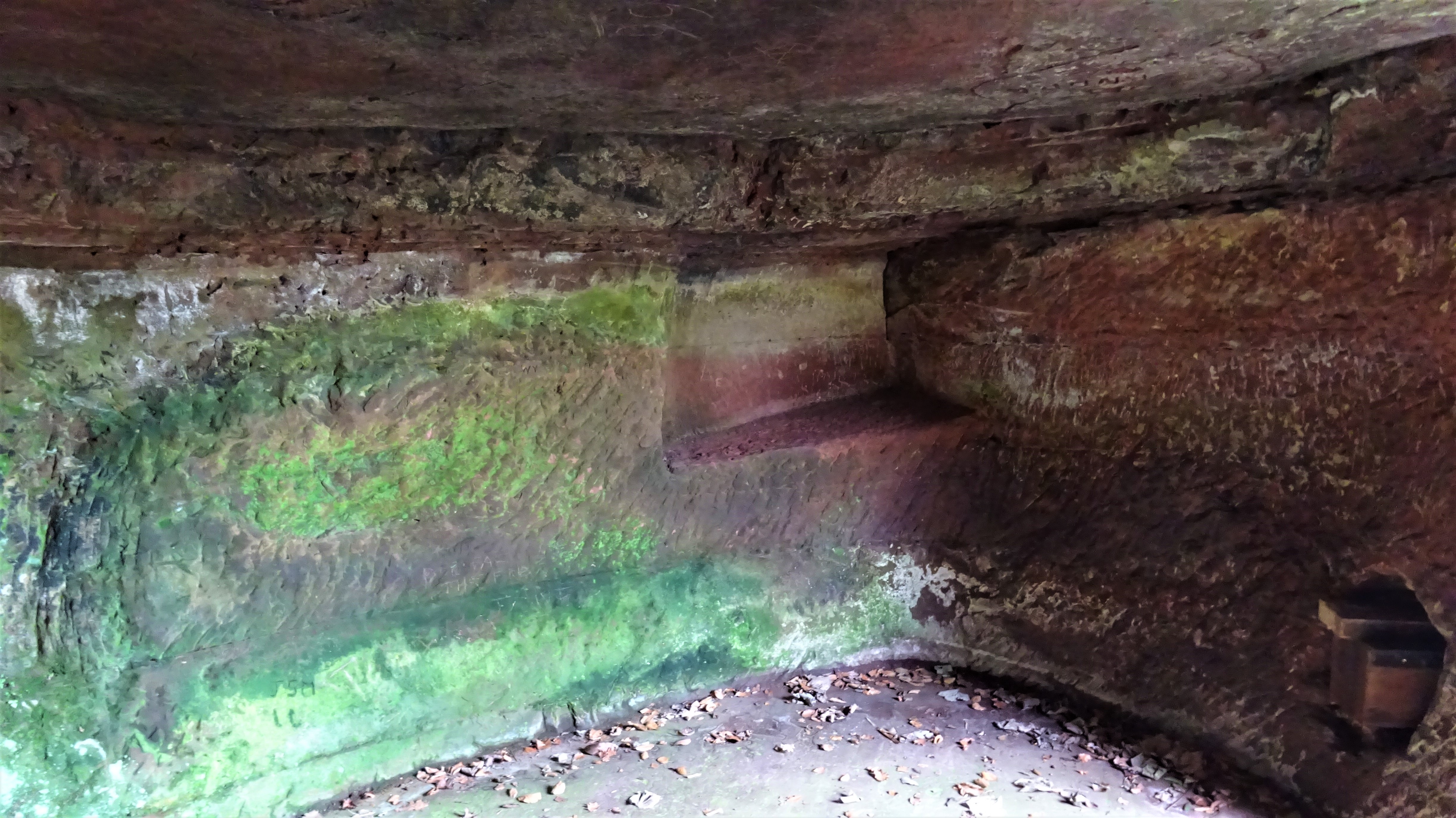
- The interior of Bruce's Cave with the altar or alcove.
- Interactive map of Bruce's Cave
- Location: Kirkpatrick-Fleming, Dumfries and Galloway
- OS grid: NY 2650 7038
- Coordinates: 55°01′21″N 3°09′04″W
- Elevation: 9 metres
- Entrances: 1
- Difficulty: Easy
- Hazards: Access
- Access: Private

Bruce's Cave or the Dunskellie Grotto is a relatively small and mainly artificial cave created in the red sandstone cliffs about 9 metres above the Kirtle Water at Cove, Kirkpatrick-Fleming, Dumfries and Galloway, Scotland. It has been associated with Robert the Bruce and the famous incident with the spider struggling to build its web.

== The cave and access ==
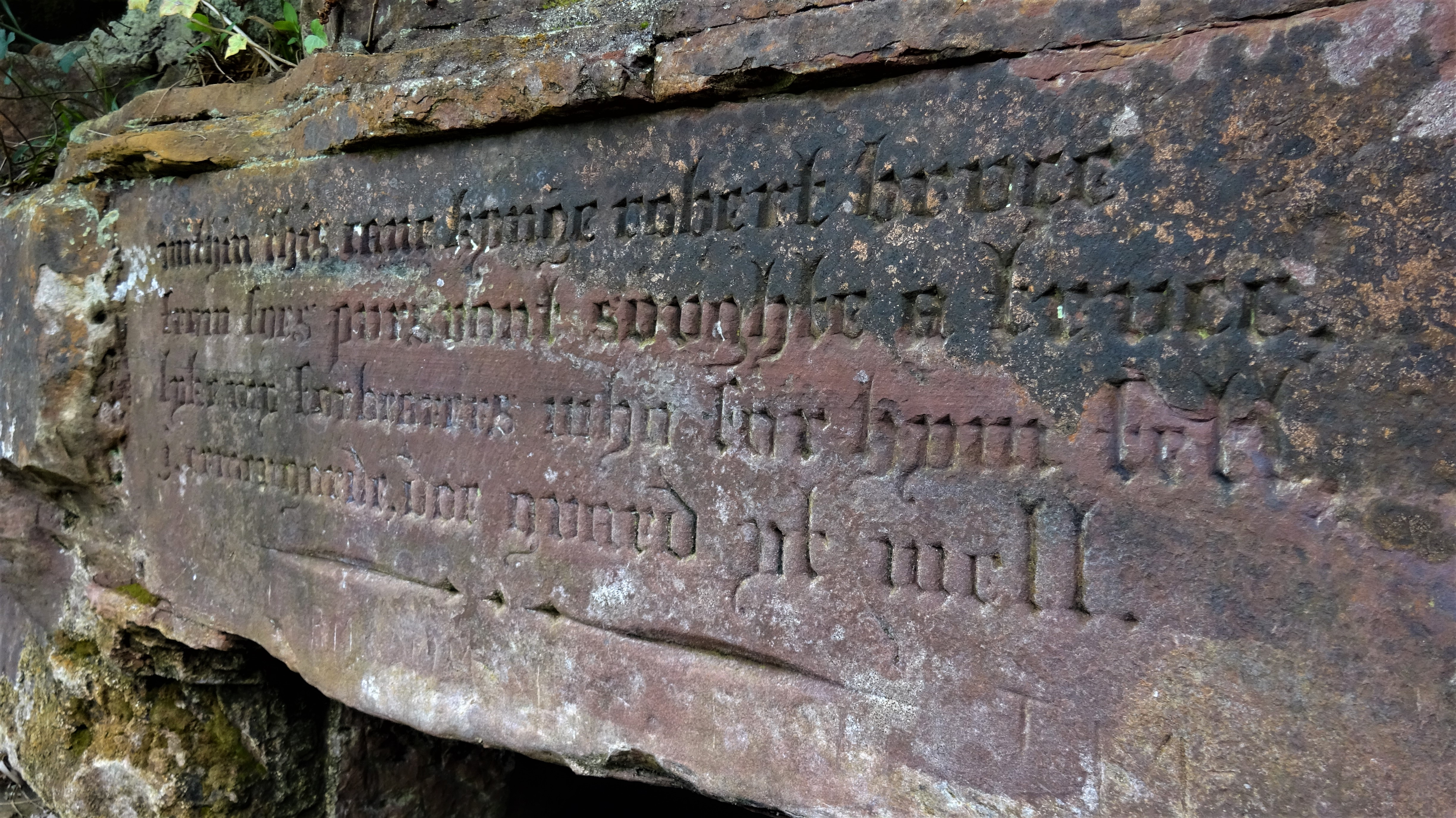
Inscription above the cave entrance.

Bruce's cave is located in a red sandstone cliff above the Kirtle Water on the south side of the water course. Access is via steps cut into the rock and a platform supported by timbers slotted into the cave via square holes cut into the rock. The pathway was built by the local council in 1927 as previously visitors were lowered on a rope over the overhang, from which they would swing into the cave, resulting in many accidents.

Bruce's Cave Caravan Park charge a small fee for parking and access to the cave.

Tool markings are distinct in a number of areas and the cave is roughly circular with an alcove or aumbry, possibly an altar lies to the right of the entrance. The dimensions are circa 5 metres east to west, 4 metres north to south with a height of circa 2 metres. The cave floor slopes with the rock strata east to west.

The cave opening is obvious from the level of the Kirtle Water and is well above the flood level of the river. The entrance has been modified several times with a rebated entrance indicating an external door closing flush with the rock face as well as internal holes in the floor and ceiling that may have been for a pair of internally closing doors. A pair of square section holes on either side have been referred to as spy or ventilation holes but may be linked to the need for large timber supports to hold up the external platform. The National Museum of Scotland holds 'Rock Doors' from Bruce's Cove.

== History ==
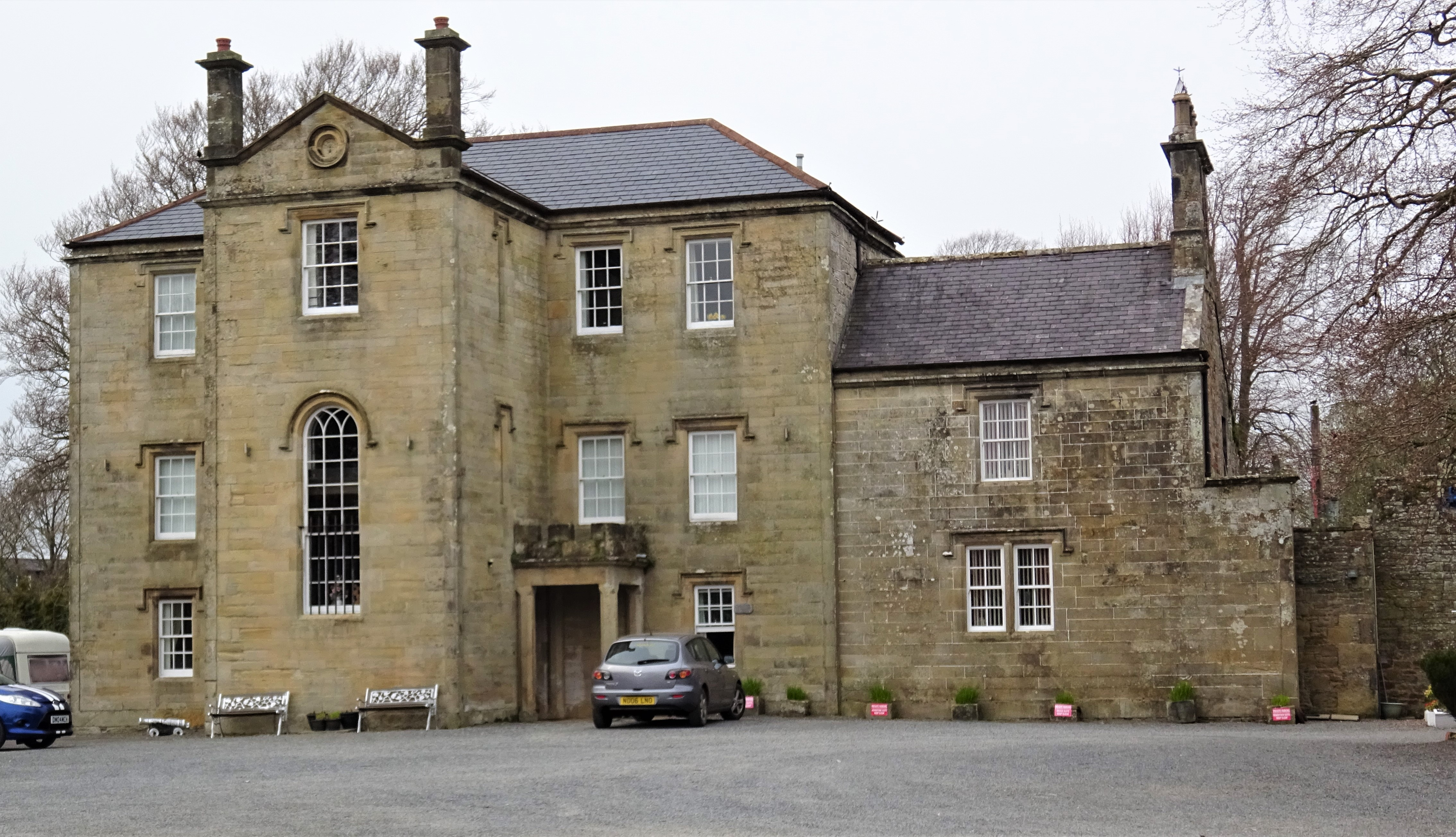
Cove House may stand on the foundations of Dunskellie Castle.

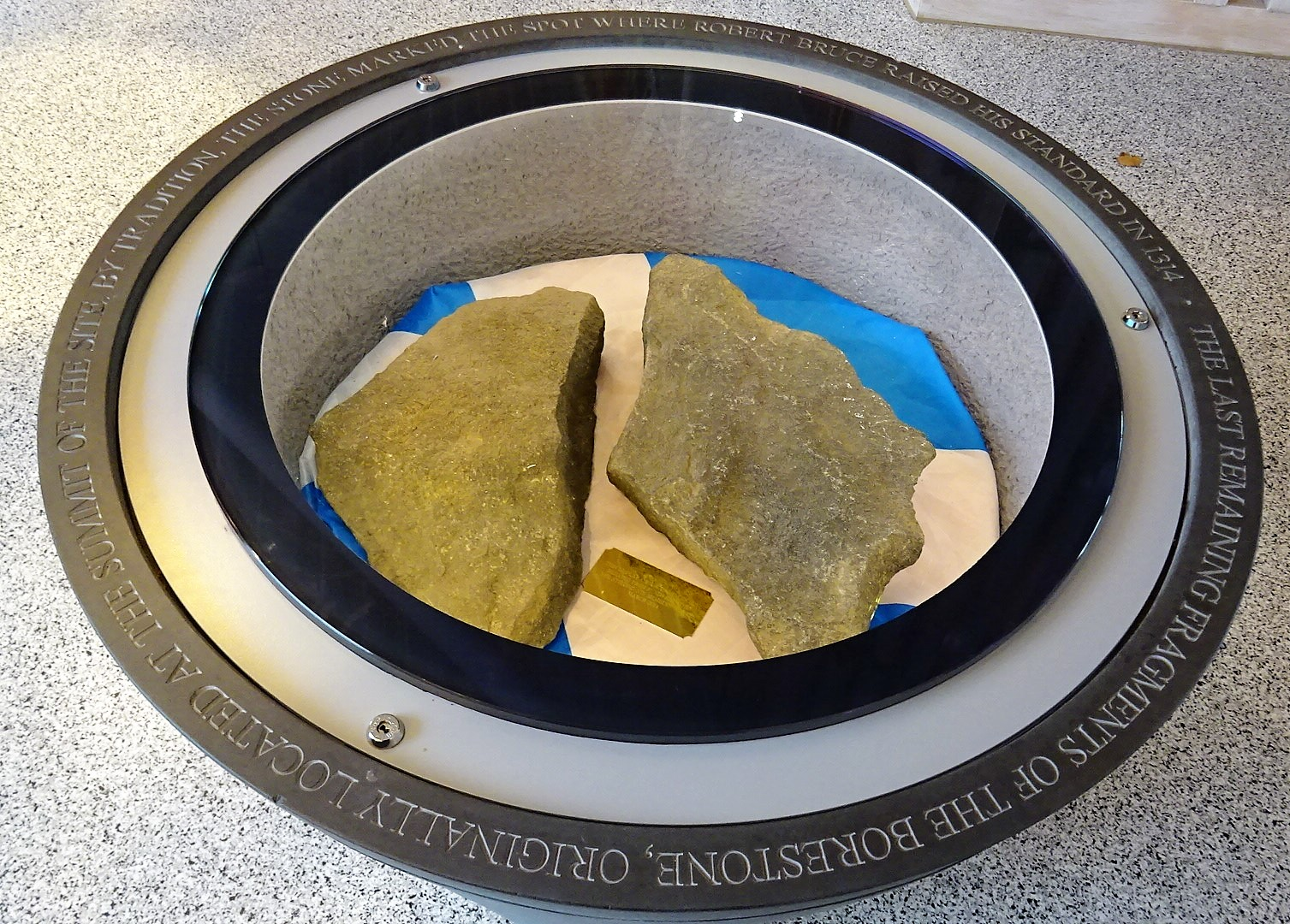
The Bannockburn Borestone remnants in which Robert the Bruce's standard was placed during the battle.

The cave may have originated as a natural cavity however its enlargement with access via ropes would have provided a secure hiding place for valuables and charters from Dunskellie Castles during border raids or wars. As early as 1408 the name 'Cove' (Scots for cave) was used instead of Dunskellie or Dunskelly as the name of the estate. In 1794 it was regarded as an antiquity but without any reference to the local legend that Robert the Bruce hid from the English soldiers here for several months in 1306, provided with food and drink by his supporter William Irving, Laird of Dunskellie. The expression "If at first you don’t succeed try, try and try again" is said to have come from this incident, however that is unlikely. A cave on Rathlin Island is another strong contender for being the site of this famous event.

The lands became known as 'Cove' and the present day mansion house is built on or near the foundations of Dunskellie Castle.

In 1907 Colonel Irving refers to the site as the "Cove of the Dunskelly" and the link with Robert the Bruce is linked with the Irving or Irvine family history to help explain the generous gift by the king of the Lands of Drum in Aberdeenshire. Sir William Irving had been Robert the Bruce's standard-bearer at the 1314 Battle of Bannockburn.

Robert the Bruce was Lord of Annandale and had lived as child at Lochmaben Castle, only 12 miles distant, as well as the family's other major castles at Turnberry and Loch Doon.

=== Dunskellie Castle and Cove House ===
Dunskellie Castle passed from the Irvings to the Johnstones in the 16th century however this led to its destruction as in 1593 Sir James Johnstone of Dunskellie attacked the Maxwells in Lockerbie and 700 were killed. As punishment he Johnstone's lands were confiscated and Dunskellie Castle was demolished. A typical 1680 two-storey laird's house was built with the stone from the old castle and in 1844 Cove House was built, incorporating parts of the older building.

=== Inscriptions ===
On the rock face beside the entrance path are two inscriptions, the first being a shield with a cross in the centre and a castellated bar across the top of the device whilst the second is a five pointed star.

Above the entrance is the following inscription :

"Within this cave kynge robert bruce
from foes pursuent soughte a truce
lyke my Forbearers who for hym fell
j ermengarde doe guard yt well".

This was carried out for Emma Ermengarda Ogilvy who had married Patrick Greville-Nugent. Emma was the granddaughter of George Ogilvy of Cove, the family having come from Aberdeenshire, acquiring the Cove Estate in 1835. The inscription is recorded as being present in 1902.

== Etymology ==
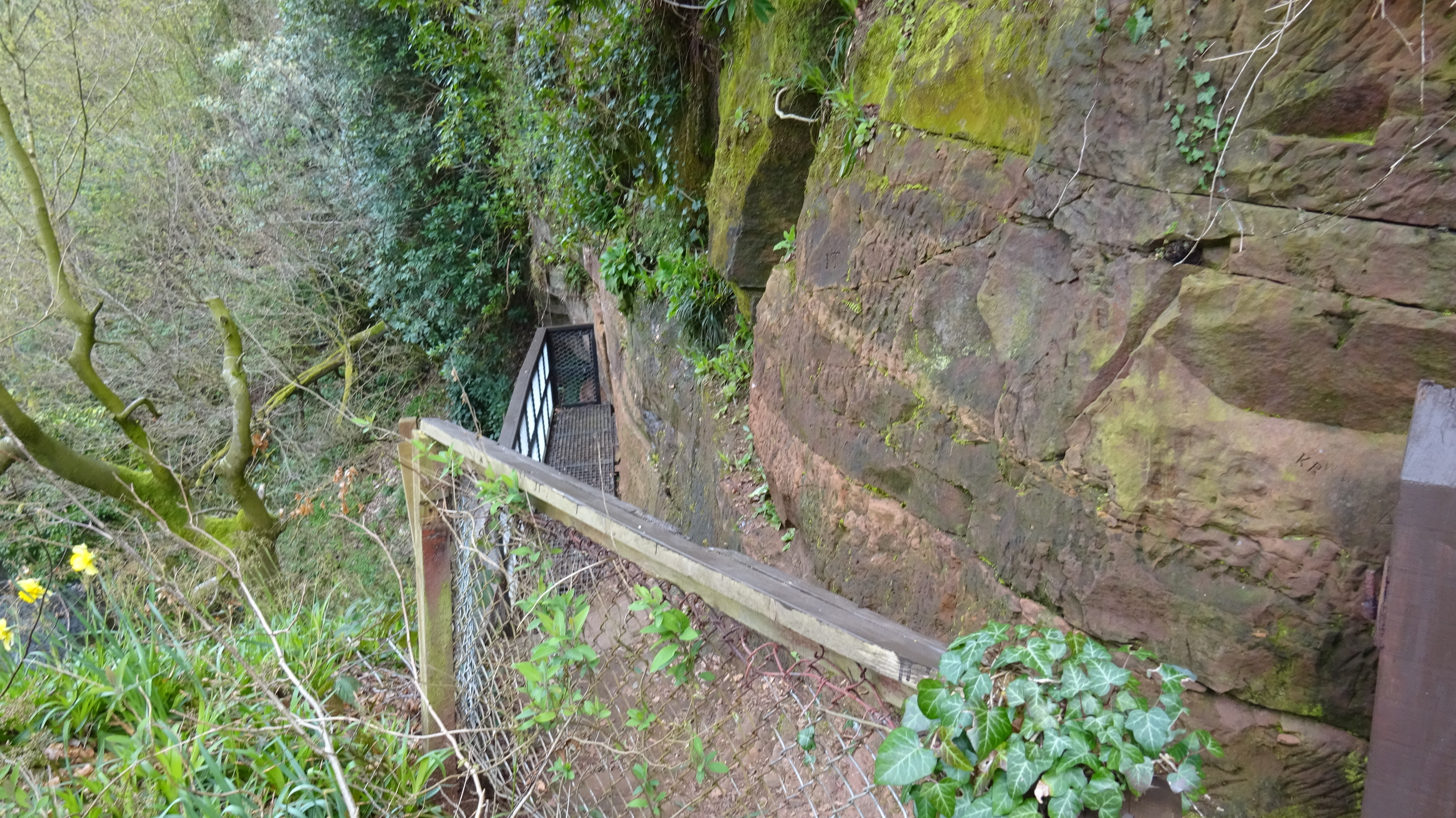
The access steps and platform at Bruce's Cave.

The name 'Dunskellie' is said to derive from the Scots Gaelic "dun sgealaighe", meaning the fort of the teller of tales or romances. The term 'grotto' may also add credence to the suggestion that the cave was once used as a hermitage and had been the abode of a soothsayer or hermit such as at St Robert's Cave in Knaresborough and Warksworth in Northumberland.

== Rock-cut bench ==
A four metre long and half metre deep bench cut into the cliff lies around 2 metres above the Kirtle Water beneath am overhanging section of the cliff below Bruce's Cave. Cut into the rock is the inscription 'M--- Irving, 1794' and many other rock-cut graffiti are present.

== See also ==
- Cleeves Cove
- Peden's Cave (Auchinbay)
