= Kirtlebridge rail crash =

1872 railway incident in Scotland

Details
- Date: 2 October 1872
- Location: Kirtlebridge
- Coordinates: 55.050°N 3.212°W
- Country: Scotland
- Line: Caledonian Railway
- Cause: Shunting took place without signalman's authority

Statistics
- Trains: 2
- Deaths: 12

The Kirtlebridge rail crash took place in 1872 at Kirtlebridge railway station in Dumfriesshire. (Note: Following the reorganisation of Local Authorities in 1975, Kirtlebridge is located in the area of Dumfries and Galloway Unitary Authority.) An express passenger train ran into a goods train that was shunting; 11 people lost their lives immediately, and one further person succumbed later. The cause was a failure to communicate between the station master in charge of the shunting operation, and the signalman. There was not full interlocking of the points, and the block system of signalling was not in use.

The location was very close to the point where the present-day A74(M) road crosses the line.

== Description ==
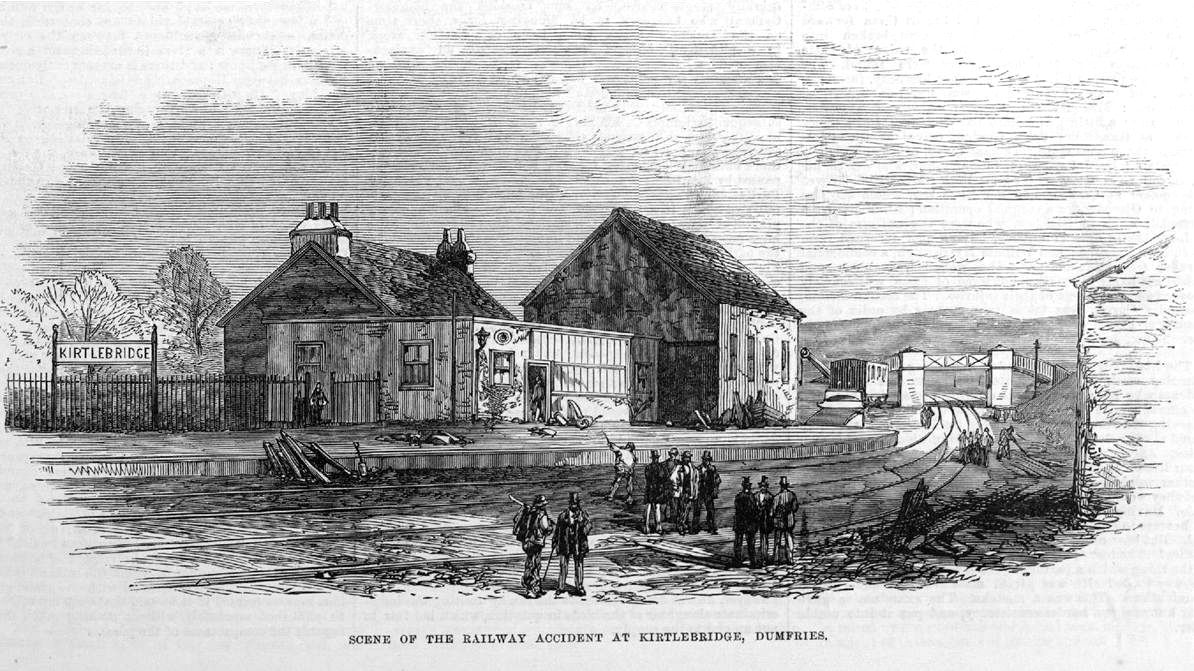
A magazine graphic of the scene after the collision; the view is looking south and the relevant sidings are not shown properly; the signal box is behind the artist and the Solway Junction line and platforms are off the frame to the right.

Kirtlebridge station was nearly 17 miles (27 km) north of Carlisle, on the Caledonian Railway main line to Glasgow and Edinburgh. North of the passenger platforms there was a trailing (in the northbound direction) junction from the Solway Junction Railway, and a signalbox controlled the junction; the points there were interlocked with the signals.

South of the station there were sidings on both sides of the main line, and a crossover, but these points were not controlled by the signalbox, being operated by ground levers, and not interlocked, nor protected by the home signal. (Note: The crossover was between 338 and 273 yards (309 and 250 m) south of the signal box, and the home signal 100 yards (90 m) south of it, so that an approaching train running up to the home signal would pass the location of the crossover.) The block system was not in operation, and communication with adjacent locations was limited.

The line may be considered to run south to north at Kirtlebridge, the down direction being northwards. Down sidings were on the west of the line and up sidings on the east.

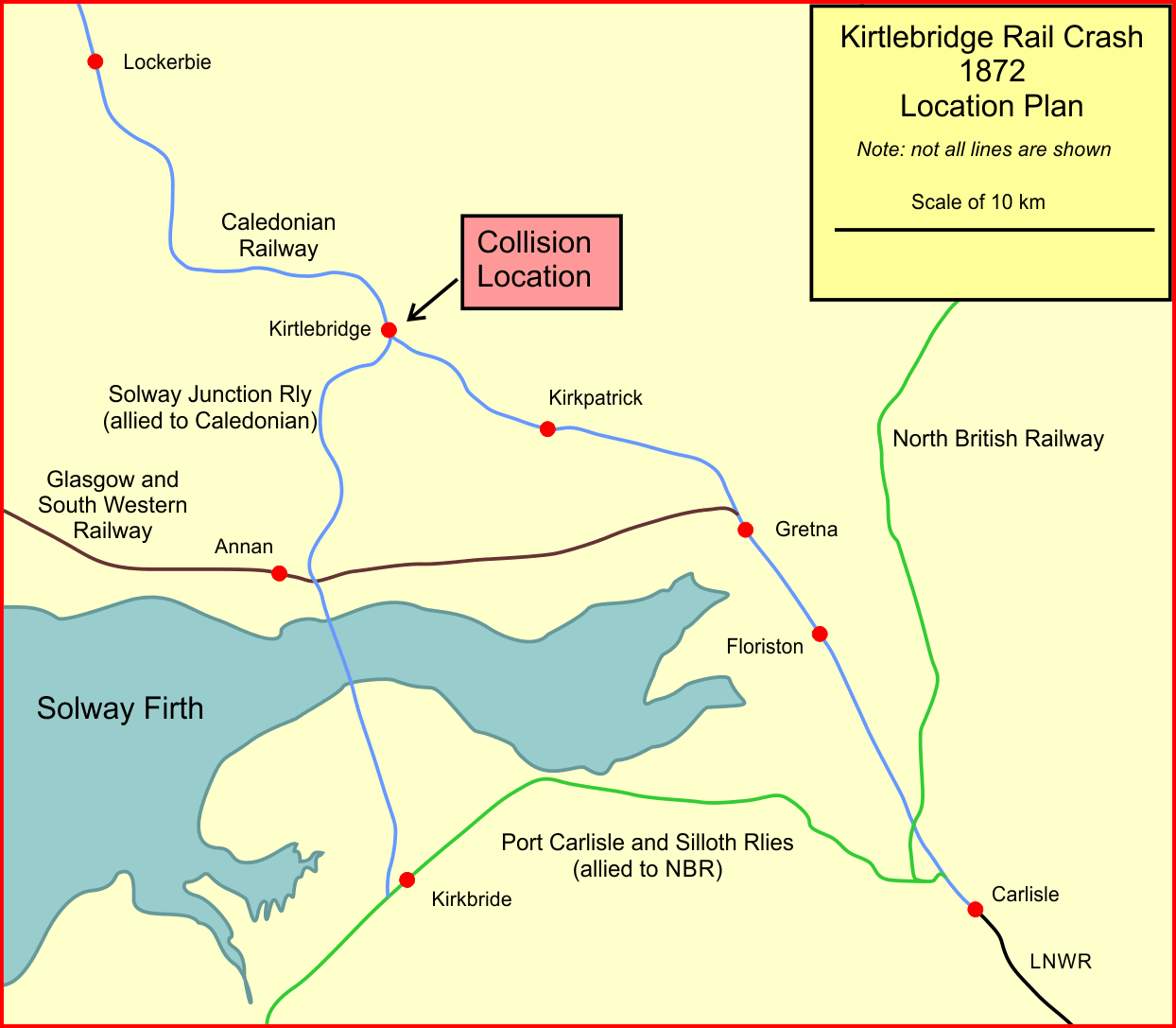
Kirtlebridge collision location

At 07:55 on 2 October 1872 a down goods train arrived at the station and started shunting operations; there were several wagons to be dropped off and collected from sidings both sides of the main line. The work was under the control of the Station Master, and he authorised the operation of a crossover that gave the goods train access to cross the main line.

An express passenger train had left London at 21:00 the previous evening, and it left Carlisle station at 07:50. It consisted of 18 vehicles pulled by two locomotives. Running at about 40 mph (65 km/h) under clear signals, the passenger train ran into wagons of the goods train that were fouling the down line.

The collision took place at 08:13.

== The goods train ==
The goods train had left Carlisle at 06:55 and made calls at Floriston, Gretna and Kirkpatrick stations, arriving at Kirtlebridge at 07:55. At Gretna the driver had been informed that the following passenger train had not left Carlisle at 07:27. On arrival at Kirtlebridge, the train crossed to the up line and detached a brake van and three wagons, and left them on the running line. The engine and part train returned to the down line and entered the down sidings, dropping two wagons there. It then returned to the up line and recoupled the detached wagons, and entered the up siding.

The accommodation was very cramped and full, and the engine now drew 17 wagons from the siding to make space, and then propelled them forward on the up line and partly through the crossover towards the down line so that the rear of the movement would clear the up line siding points. It was the intention to move the last (southernmost) wagon by hand into the up siding. At this moment the down express passenger train approached and struck the middle wagons of the seventeen being propelled.

== The passenger train ==
The passenger train was the 06:00 from Carlisle, the continuation of the 21:00 from London Euston. Due to an unrelated accident south of Carlisle, it was running late and left Carlisle at 07:50. It consisted of two tender engines and 18 trailing vehicles. (Note: Tyler's contemporary report gives the consist as "a break-van, a composite, a third-class, a composite, a third-class, and a composite carriages, two empty carriage-trucks, an empty horse-box, a family saloon carriage, a composite, a third-class, and a composite carriages, a break-van, a composite, a third-class, and a composite carriages, and a break-van." (Tyler's spelling retained.))

It made its journey in the ordinary way and passed Kirtlebridge distant signal at "clear" but on rounding the right-hand curve past an overbridge, the fireman of the leading engine saw the wagons of the goods train partly obstructing the line ahead. He thought he said to the driver, "Pull up!" but the train was running at 40 mph (65 km/h) and the train was only a short distance from the obstruction; the collision followed inevitably.

The leading engine came to rest across the up line, and was turned so as to face south. Its tender mounted the platform, and the second engine came to rest in its proper alignment. The rails were "torn away" by the first engine and the coaching vehicles were considerably telescoped as they overran the derailed engine. (Note: The coaching stock of the period consisted of a strong underframe surmounted by a relatively light body framework. In the event of collision, it frequently happened that the underframe of one vehicle overrode the underframe of the preceding vehicle and slid along it, destroying the body of the latter and causing serious injury to any occupants. The process is referred to as "telescoping".)

Of the fatalities, several persons died instantly, but many of the injured died "within an hour of the accident, or on their being taken out of the débris". Henry Tyler reported that the engine driver and ten passengers were killed, and fifteen injured. One further person died of injuries after Tyler made his report.

== The signal box ==
The signal box was located to the north of the passenger platforms, and controlled the junction with the Solway line. The down main line home signal was at the converging junction there, and there was a down main line distant signal 700 yards (640 m) on the approach side.

There were several sidings in the Solway part of the station, controlled from the signal box, but the sidings in the main line were located south of the station and were not operated from the signal box; moreover they were on the approach side of the home signal.

Although the electric telegraph system of signalling had been installed on the Solway line, there was no block system on the main line and the signalman had no means of communicating with other main line signalboxes.

The signalman did not have a clear view of the siding connections.

== The system of work ==
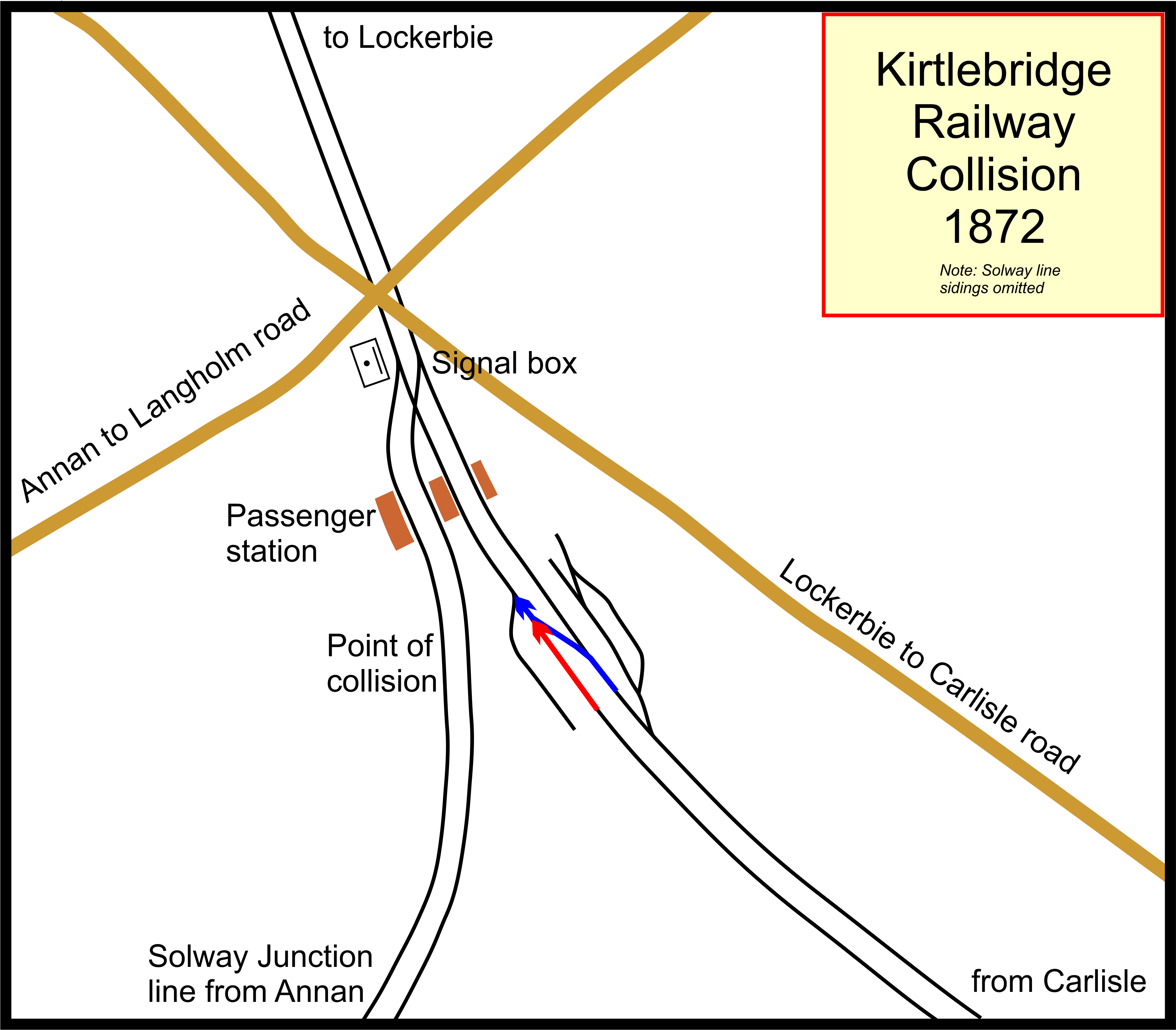
Kirtlebridge collision plan

It is evident that there was no safe system of work in force. The signalman operated his main line signals independently of the operation of the siding and crossover points. The station master, named Corrie, was nominally responsible for the shunting arrangements, but he seems to have limited this to directing what wagons were to be taken on rather than working with the signalman. He was apparently oblivious of the need to consider the approaching express train. Tyler commented:

During these shunting operations, the goods-engine driver took his instructions from the goods guard, but the latter was acting principally on his own responsibility. The only communication, according to the guard, that passed between him and any person at the station was shortly after his arrival, when the station-master asked him what he was shunting for, and he replied, "The 6.00 a.m. passenger train from Carlisle".

The signalman on duty in the cabin at the north of the station saw the goods train arrive at 7.55, and immediately set his home and distant-signals to danger to protect it. He noticed that this train was shunted from the down to the up line, but it was done without any communication with him.

In 1872 modern notions of a safe system of work did not exist, and the management of the Caledonian Railway evidently thought it adequate to rely on the common sense of the local staff. The station master set about ordering shunting movements fouling the main lines without any liaison with the signalman, and it is clear that this had become a routine method of working, relying on assumptions about the running of other trains. Normally the express passenger train would have passed Kirtlebridge well before the goods train required to shunt. On this occasion the delay to it earlier in its journey meant that the unsafe working led to tragedy.

== The aftermath ==
The site of the collision was clearly a scene of death and injury. "A large staff of medical men were telegraphed for" and a doctor and a nurse on the train did much to alleviate immediate suffering.

Train working was over the Glasgow and South Western Railway route via Dumfries and then the Dumfries to Lockerbie branch line, for the remainder of the day.

The station master Corrie was arrested and charged with culpable homicide (i.e. manslaughter), although he was reported to have been released on bail by 7 October. The inspector of permanent way, Gilmour, was then sought by the police on a charge of murder allegedly committed at Shotts the day before the accident.

At this time the Railway Inspectorate section of the Board of Trade were pursuing a policy of urging the railway companies to fit interlocking and the block system on their lines; Tyler repeated this insistence in his report. Proper interlocking would have prevented the clearing of the main signals when the crossover was open; a block system would have given the signalman the means of ascertaining the approach of trains, and the means of refusing the approach if his station was blocked by shunting operations.

The Times newspaper also demanded the introduction of improved couplings and buffing gear between the coaches so as to reduce the risk of telescoping.

== See also ==
List of UK rail accidents by year
