= Kirkpatrick Fleming =

Village and civil parish in Dumfries and Galloway, Scotland

Coordinates: 55°1′27.06″N 3°8′5.29″W

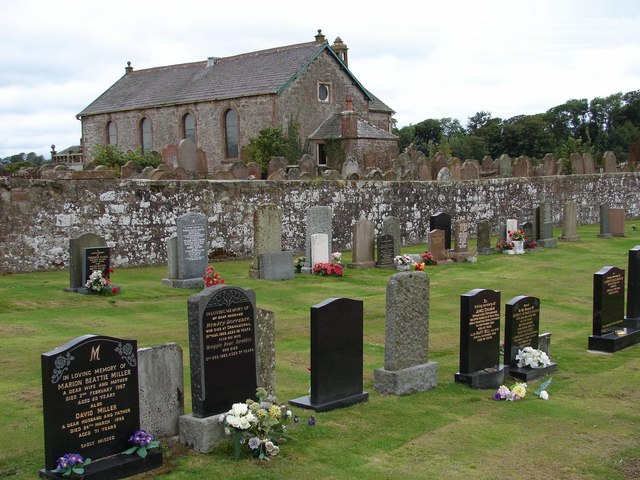
Kirkpatrick-Fleming Kirk

Kirkpatrick Fleming (Scottish Gaelic: Cill Phàdraig) is a village and civil parish in Dumfries and Galloway, south-west Scotland.

== Geography ==
It is located between the Kirtle Water and the A74(M) motorway, the Solway Firth, and the Cumbrian hills are visible from the village. Kirkpatrick-Fleming is 5 miles (8 km) east of Annan, 21.2 miles (34 km) east of Dumfries, 3.4 miles (5 km) north-west of Gretna and 16.4 miles (26 km) north-west of Carlisle.

== Etymology ==
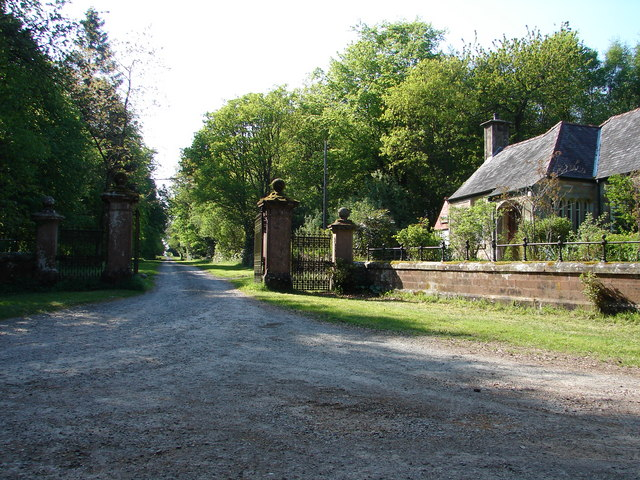
East Lodge, Springkell Estate

The name is derived from the parish church, dedicated to St Patrick, and the Fleming family, the local landowners who resided at Redhall. The medieval parish church was given to Gisborough Priory in Cleveland by Robert de Brus, Lord of Annandale, around 1170, though this connection lapsed after 1330. The present church dates to the 18th century and is protected as a category B listed building.

== Railways ==
The village was served by Kirkpatrick railway station on the old Caledonian Railway main line from 1847 to 1960. Today, the line is part of the West Coast Main Line.

== Bruce's Cave ==
Bruce's Cave, which boasts a cave allegedly used by King Robert the Bruce. Here the fleeing king is supposed to have watched a spider swinging from one side of the cave to the other, which gave rise to the saying "if at first you don't succeed, try, try, try again".

== Books ==
Due to a legacy left to the parish by a former resident, Ann Hill, the archaeology and history of Kirkpatrick Fleming have been studied in two volumes both published by the Dumfriesshire and Galloway Natural History and Antiquarian Society:

- Roger Mercer and others, Kirkpatrick Fleming Dumfriesshire: an Anatomy of a Parish in South West Scotland, 1997
- Duncan and Sheila Adamson, Kirkpatrick Fleming: On the Borders of History, 2011

== Sport ==
KP is a virtual football club from the village.

== Notable people ==
Fleming is the birthplace of inventor Andrew Smith circa 1798, Andrew Smith is the Father of inventor Andrew Smith Hallidie, who is recognised as being a leading light in the inventing of the wire cable system used by the San Francisco Cable Cars.
