= Kirtlebridge =

Village in Dumfries and Galloway, Scotland

Coordinates: 55.044°N 3.193°W

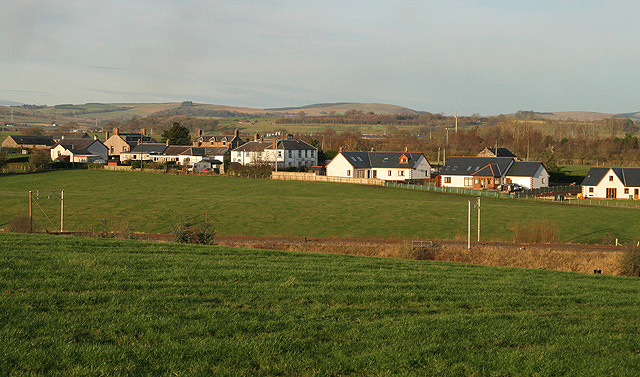
The village of Kirtlebridge

Kirtlebridge is a village in Dumfries and Galloway, southern Scotland. It is located 8 kilometres (5.0 mi) north-east of Annan, 5 kilometres (3.1 mi) north-west of Kirkpatrick-Fleming, and 1.5 kilometres (0.93 mi) south of Eaglesfield. The village is located where the A74(M) motorway and the West Coast Main Line railway cross the Kirtle Water.

It used to have a village pub but it is now a licensed guest house which has a residents bar and is very dog friendly.

Kirtlebridge railway station on the main line formerly served the village, and a nearby junction marked the start of the Solway Junction Railway to Annan. The Kirtlebridge rail crash occurred at the station on 2 October 1872, and resulted in 12 deaths.

Not far from the village is Bonshaw Tower and its more recent adjoining house. The tower was one of a number of structures built along the border as protection against incursions by the British.
