= Carlisle Kingmoor Marshalling Yard =

Railway maintenance depot in Carlisle, Cumbria

Coordinates: 54.9304°N 2.9787°W

- Interactive map of Carlisle Kingmoor Marshalling Yard

Location
- Location: Carlisle, Cumbria

Characteristics
- Owner: Network Rail
- Depot code: KM (1975 -)
- Type: Diesel

Carlisle Kingmoor Marshalling Yard is a stabling point located in Carlisle, Cumbria, England. The depot is situated on the West Coast Main Line and is near Carlisle station.

== History ==
From 1950 to 1982, Class 03, 04, 08, 09 and 11 shunters, and Class 17, 25, 27, 28 and 40 mainline diesel locomotives.

== Present ==
From 2013, the depot has no allocation. It is, instead, a stabling point for EWS Class 66 locomotives.
