= Kirtle Water =

River in Dumfries and Galloway, Scotland

Coordinates: 54°59′N 3°05′W

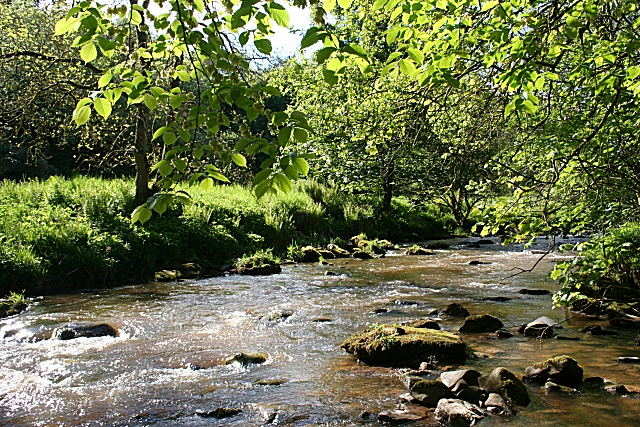
Kirtle Water

The Kirtle Water is a river in Dumfries and Galloway in southern Scotland. It rises on the southern slopes of Haggy Hill where its headwaters are impounded to form Winterhope Reservoir. Below the dam it flows in a generally southerly direction passing Waterbeck and Eaglesfield to the village of Kirtlebridge along which stretch it is closely followed both by the A74(M) motorway and the mainline railway between Carlisle and Glasgow. From Kirtlebridge it turns southeastwards to flow by Kirkpatrick-Fleming and on, to the west of Gretna, to empty into the estuary of the Border Esk at the eastern limit of the Solway Firth.
