= Rockcliffe =

Rockcliffe may refer to:

== Places ==
=== Canada ===
- Rockcliffe Park, Ontario
- Rockcliffe-Smythe, a neighbourhood of Toronto

=== United Kingdom ===
England

- Rockcliffe, Cumbria
- Rockcliffe, Lancashire
- Rockcliffe Cross, Cumbria

Scotland

- Rockcliffe, Dumfries and Galloway

Wales

- Rockcliffe, Flintshire, see List of places along Wales Coast Path

=== United States ===
- Rockcliffe Mansion, in Hannibal, Missouri

== Other uses ==
- Rockcliffe Park Public School, in Rockcliffe Park, Ontario
- CFB Rockcliffe, a former Canadian Forces Base in Ottawa
- HMCS Rockcliffe (J335)
- Ottawa/Rockcliffe Airport
- Rockcliffe Flying Club
- Rockcliffe railway station, in Cumbria, disused

== See also ==
- Rockcliff
- Rockliff
- Rockliffe
