= Scotby railway station (Midland Railway) =

Railway station in Cumbria, England

Scotby

General information
- Other names: Scotby (Mid)
- Location: Scotby, Cumbria; England
- Coordinates: 54.8833°N 2.8707°W
- Grid reference: NY442546
- Line: Settle–Carlisle
- Platforms: 2
- Tracks: 2

History
- Opened: 1 May 1876
- Closed: 1 February 1942
- Original company: Midland Railway
- Pre-grouping: Midland Railway
- Post-grouping: London, Midland and Scottish Railway
Location

Scotby railway station served the village of Scotby in Cumbria, England. It was built by the Midland Railway and located on the Settle–Carlisle line, although another station, also named Scotby, served the Carlisle to Newcastle line. The Midland Railway station operated between 1876 and 1942.

== History ==
Although the building of the line had been started some years previously, the contract for Scotby station was not let until July 1874, when George Black of Carlisle was successful in his bid to build Scotby and the seven other stations southwards on the line. Scotby station opened on 1 May 1876, and was on the Midland Railway built Settle–Carlisle Line, some 3 miles (5 km) south of Carlisle railway station. It was provided with only one siding, which had cattle dock and a crane that could lift up to 1.5 tonnes (1.7 tons). The main station buildings were on the 'down' (Carlisle bound) platform, and although it originally had a signal box, which opened in August 1875, this was removed in 1909. The two railway stations at Scotby were only 0.5 miles (0.80 km) apart, and they had no naming differences, and so on maps they were simply labelled as Scotby (MID), and Scotby (NER).

The station was an early closure on the line, with passenger and goods services withdrawn in February 1942. Various reasons have been given for its early closure, such as the proximity of the NER station, or the closeness of Scotby to Carlisle (where local buses could move passengers into the city).

In October 1886, three men who had been painting Scotby station were killed when they were run down by a passing train. The men had finished work for the day and were walking back along the line towards Carlisle (where they were lodging) when they stepped off the 'up' line and onto the 'down' line to avoid a train, but they were unaware of the express on the down line, which killed two outright, with the third dying later of his injuries. In 1923, a seven-year old child was run over and killed by an express train as she crossed the lines at the station. The express carried her body for 40 yards (37 m). The coroner attached no blame to the railway or its officials. At the time, the station did not have a footbridge to enable people to safely cross the line; the Scotby Women's Institute campaigned for a footbridge to be installed in 1924.

In comparison to other stations on the line, Scotby was not as well-used by passengers. Taken over a broad spread of years between 1875 and 1922, it averaged only 2.1 season tickets on an annual basis; whereas Cumwhinton, Cotehill and Armathwaite had 10.5, 3.5 and 6.8 on average respectively.

== Services ==
In 1888, services consisted of six daily workings northwards into Carlisle, but only four stopping trains in the reverse direction. In 1900, five trains a day stopped in either direction, which by 1910 had increased to six stopping trains in either direction, four of which travelled the full length of the line, and two which started/terminated at Appleby.

Preceding station	Historical railways	Following station
Cumwhinton	Midland Railway; Settle-Carlisle Railway	Carlisle
