= Lazonby =

Village and civil parish in Cumbria, England

Coordinates: 54.75011°N 2.70333°W

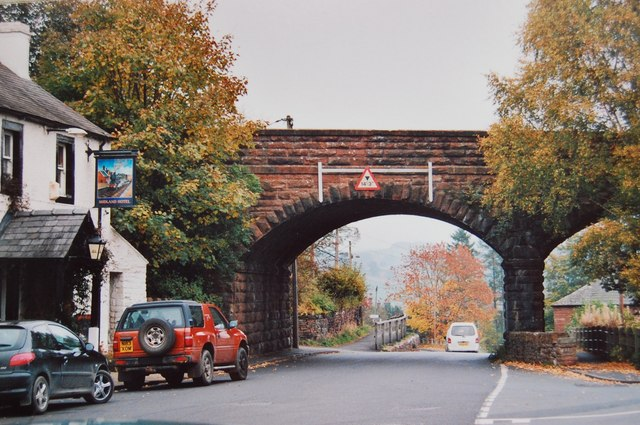
- The railway bridge in the centre of the village.

- Location within Cumbria
- Population: 976 (2011)
- OS grid reference: NY5439
- Civil parish: Lazonby
- Unitary authority: Westmorland and Furness
- Ceremonial county: Cumbria
- Region: North West
- Country: England
- Sovereign state: United Kingdom
- Post town: PENRITH
- Postcode district: CA10
- Dialling code: 01768
- Police: Cumbria
- Fire: Cumbria
- Ambulance: North West
- UK Parliament: Penrith and Solway

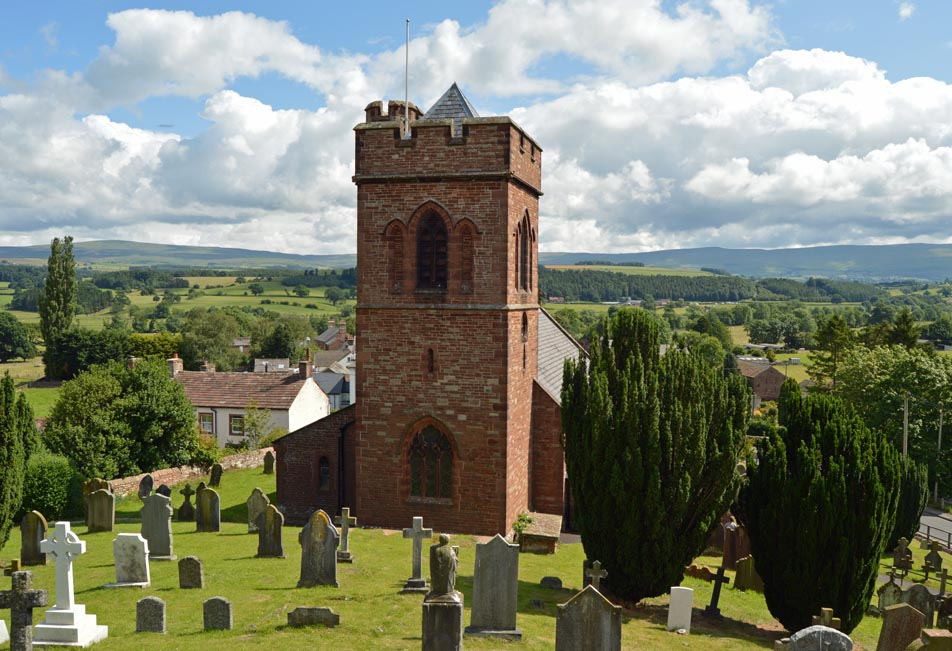
The parish church of St Nicholas, Lazonby, Cumbria. The church occupies a prominent position looking over the Eden valley, and was rebuilt in 1864–6 to a design by Anthony Salvin.

Lazonby is a village and civil parish in the Lower Eden Valley of Cumbria; it is located about 8 miles (13 km) north-north-east of Penrith and 24 miles (38 km) south of the Scottish Borders. Traditionally part of the historic county of Cumberland, it is now within the Westmorland and Furness unitary authority area. The total population of the ward of Lazonby, which also includes the nearby villages of North Dykes, Great Salkeld and Salkeld Dykes, was 1,425 at the time of the 2001 UK Census; this figure included 1,011 people between the ages of 16 and 74, of whom 675 were in employment. At the time of the 2011 Census, the population had decreased to 976.

== Description ==
The village has one church, one chapel, two pubs (the Midland Hotel and the Joiner's Arms), a primary school, retained fire station, a Lakes & Dales Co-operative supermarket and post office, livestock auction mart, swimming pool and campsite , railway station (part of the Settle-Carlisle line) and the Bell's of Lazonby bakery complex. There is also an independent wooden toy shop, Croglin Toys & Designs (www.croglindesigns.co.uk) which is located in the old school (approx. 18th century), and an independent petrol station. The village has its own village hall with snooker club and allotments.

The parish church of St. Nicholas forms a united benefice with churches at nearby Great Salkeld and Kirkoswald. The church was rebuilt in 1864–6 to a design by Anthony Salvin, at the expense of the Macleans of Lazonby Hall. A notable feature is the woodwork executed by Canon B W Wilson, Rector 1877–1920. This can be seen on the south door, north vestry door, the pulpit and the chancel, organ and tower screens. There is an imposing unornamented wheel cross at top of the graveyard, possibly 10th century. There are 4 bells hung for full-circle ringing.

In recent years many new housing developments have sprung up in the village. The village today is lived in mostly by people who work in either Penrith or Carlisle.

The civil parish of Lazonby contains no other villages but does include the settlements of Baronwood and Brackenbank. At Low Plains there is a mineral water bottling plant which bottles "Aqua Pura" mineral water. At one time the parish included the Chapelry of Plumpton within which were the settlements of Salkeld Gate, Brockleymoor, Plumpton Foot and Theifside. Plumpton, (or Plumpton Wall) was a chapelry or township of Lazonby until 1866.

Lazonby Fell and Wan Fell are designated as Sites of Special Scientific Interest.

Local business Bells of Lazonby previously manufactured bakery products for Booths supermarket chain.

== Events ==
For over four decades, the Kirkoswald Methodist Youth Guild (for members aged 11 and older) has staged a local pantomime in the village hall. The group holds meetings and other activities throughout the year.

Since 2008 there has been a bi-annual music concert in Lazonby which takes place on the school field. Featuring local and national bands, Lazonby Fest took place on 5 July 2008 and Lazonby Live took place on 12 June 2010. The festival's purpose is to raise money for the local school and other local charities. The festival took a break in 2012 due to the Olympics and the Diamond Jubilee but Lazonby Live returned on 7 September 2013 at a new location, Nunwick Cricket Club in Great Salkeld.

== Governance ==
An electoral ward exists in the same name. This ward stretches south to Great Salkeld with a total population taken at the 2011 Census of 1,388.

== Transport ==
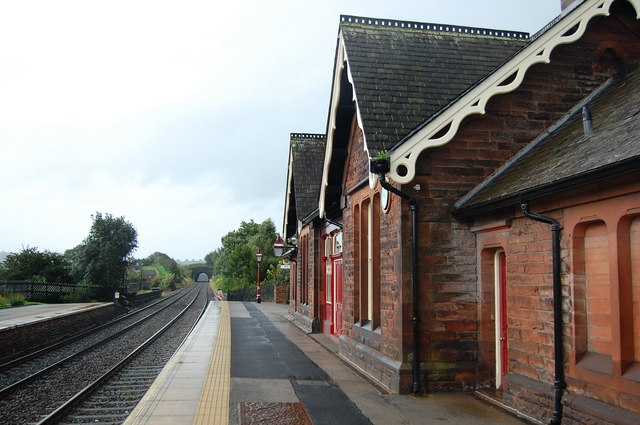
The village's railway station

Lazonby & Kirkoswald railway station is sited on the Settle to Carlisle line. Northern Trains operates regular services between Leeds and Carlisle.

Two bus routes run through Lazonby, operated by Fellrunner. The 130 runs between Melmerby and Carlisle once each way on Wednesdays and the 137 between Langwathby and Penrith once each way on Thursdays.

== See also ==
- Listed buildings in Lazonby
