= Lazonby & Kirkoswald railway station =

Railway station in Cumbria, England

Lazonby & Kirkoswald
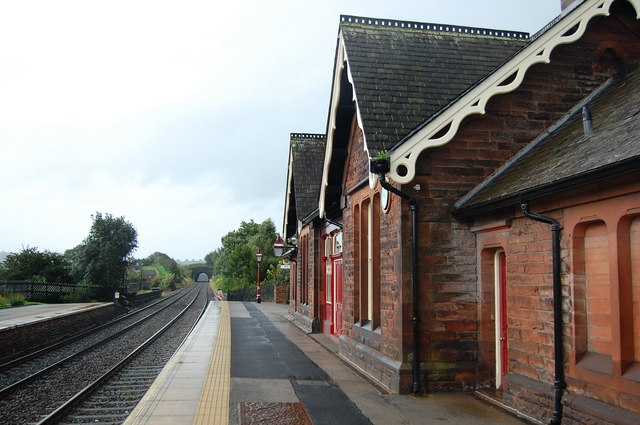

General information
- Location: Lazonby, Westmorland and Furness; England
- Coordinates: 54°45′03″N 2°42′13″W
- Grid reference: NY548397
- Owner: Network Rail
- Manager: Northern Trains
- Platforms: 2
- Tracks: 2

Other information
- Station code: LZB
- Classification: DfT category F2

History
- Original company: Midland Railway
- Pre-grouping: Midland Railway
- Post-grouping: London, Midland and Scottish Railway; British Rail (London Midland Region)

Key dates
- 1 May 1876: Opened as Lazonby
- 22 July 1895: Renamed Lazonby & Kirkoswald
- 4 May 1970: Closed
- 14 July 1986: Reopened

Passengers
- 2021/22: ▲10,428
- 2022/23: ▲13,306
- 2023/24: ▲17,956
- 2024/25: ▲18,548
- 2025/26: ▲19,118

Services
Preceding station	Northern	Following station
Langwathby towards Leeds via Settle	Settle and Carlisle Line	Armathwaite towards Carlisle
Location
- Location within the former Eden District Location within Cumbria
Notes
- Passenger statistics from the Office of Rail and Road

Lazonby & Kirkoswald is a railway station on the Settle and Carlisle Line, which runs between Carlisle and Leeds via Settle. The station, which is situated 15 miles 32 chains (24.8 km) south-east of Carlisle, serves the villages of Kirkoswald, Lazonby and Great Salkeld in Cumbria, England. It is owned by Network Rail and managed by Northern Trains.

== History ==
The station was opened by the Midland Railway on 1 May 1876. The station was designed by the Midland Railway company architect John Holloway Sanders.

Originally named Lazonby, it was renamed Lazonby & Kirkoswald on 22 July 1895. It is situated in the centre of Lazonby and, like many other stations on the line, was closed on 4 May 1970 when local passenger services between Skipton and Carlisle were withdrawn. The platforms and buildings survived however, and following several years of use by DalesRail excursions it was reopened on a full-time basis in July 1986. The old goods shed and yard is now used by a local bakery.

The southbound platform has a stone shelter and access ramps from the nearby road (so it is fully DDA-compliant). On the northbound platform, there is a bus-style waiting shelter. There is no ticket machine (though one is planned for the station by the end of 2019 as part of TOC Northern's wider programme of station improvements) or booking office, so tickets have to be bought in advance or on the train. Train running information is available via information boards and posters, digital information screens and a telephone helpline.

== Services ==
As of the winter timetable change, the station is served by eight trains per day (six on Sunday) towards Carlisle. Heading towards Leeds via Settle, there are seven trains per day (six on Sunday). All services are operated by Northern Trains.

Rolling stock used: Class 156 Super Sprinter and Class 158 Express Sprinter

== Accidents and incidents ==
- Services between Appleby (later Armathwaite) and Carlisle were suspended from 9 February 2016, due to a landslip north of the station at Eden Brows. The station was the penultimate stop before the northern terminus of the Settle and Carlisle Line until 30 March 2017, when the £23 million project to repair the embankment and reinstate the track bed was completed by Network Rail.

Preceding station	National Rail	Following station
Langwathby	Northern Trains; Settle and Carlisle Line	Armathwaite
	Historical railways	
Little Salkeld	Midland Railway; Settle and Carlisle Line	Armathwaite
