= AWT =

AWT may stand for:

- The Abstract Window Toolkit, part of the Java programming language
- Antony Worrall Thompson, the British chef
- Aphrodite World Tour, a 2011 concert tour by Australian pop/dance singer Kylie Minogue
- Armathwaite railway station, England; National Rail station code AWT
- Airborne wind turbine, a concept design wind turbine
- Withholding tax, Automatic Withholding Tax (also known as WHT)
- Advanced World Transport, Czech cargo railway operator
- Alternative Waste Treatment, a subset of waste treatment. List of solid waste treatment technologies
