= Rockcliff =

Rockcliff may refer to:

- Sir Walter Rockcliff Farquhar, former owner of Polesden Lacey
- Isodendrion laurifolium (rockcliff isodendrion), flowering plant in the violet family found in Hawaii
- Rockcliff, a boat which was wrecked in 1836
- Whitley Bay Rockcliff RFC, English rugby union team

== See also ==
- Rockcliffe
- Rockliff
- Rockliffe
