= Cumwhinton railway station =

Former railway station in Cumbria, England

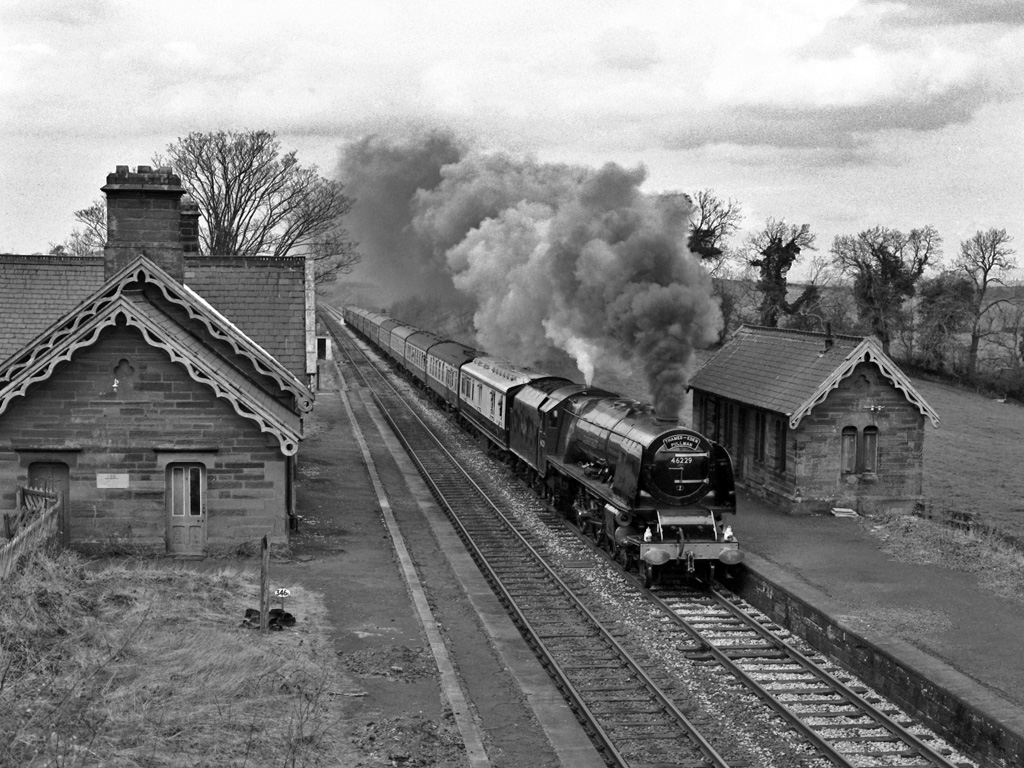
- 46229 Duchess of Hamilton passes the closed Cumwhinton station

General information
- Location: England
- Coordinates: 54.8698°N 2.8520°W
- Grid reference: NY454531
- Platforms: 2

Other information
- Status: Disused

History
- Original company: Midland Railway
- Post-grouping: London Midland and Scottish Railway

Key dates
- 1 May 1876: Station opened
- 5 November 1956: Station closed

Listed Building – Grade II
- Designated: 9 March 1984
- Reference no.: 1335564
Location

Cumwhinton railway station was a railway station serving the village of Cumwhinton in Cumbria, England. The station was located on the Settle and Carlisle Line and was closed in 1956. The station is still intact, including platforms, and the station buildings are now grade II listed structures.

== History ==
The station was designed by John Holloway Sanders, who designed many of the other stations on the Settle–Carlisle line. It was listed as being a small (or minor) station in the original Midland Railway plans. It was opened with the rest of them on the initial opening of the line in May 1876 and had its station buildings on the down line (towards Carlisle). The station is 4 miles (6.4 km) south east of Carlisle and 304 miles (489 km) north of St Pancras railway station in London, via Cudworth and Keighley. The station was afforded a three-road goods shed on the down side and a signal box just north of the station which closed in 1957.

The main station building is made of red sandstone with a slate roof, is privately owned & occupied and is now a grade II listed structure. Additionally, the Midland Railway provided four railway cottages for workers besides the traditional stationmaster's house.

There have been petitions and public appeals to re-open the station to passenger traffic. There are plans to build new houses on the station site, although the main buildings are listed.

Preceding station	Historical railways	Following station
Cotehill	Midland Railway; Settle-Carlisle Railway	Scotby
