= Carlisle London Road railway station =

Disused railway station in Cumbria, England

Coordinates: 54°53′10″N 2°55′07″W

Carlisle (London Road)
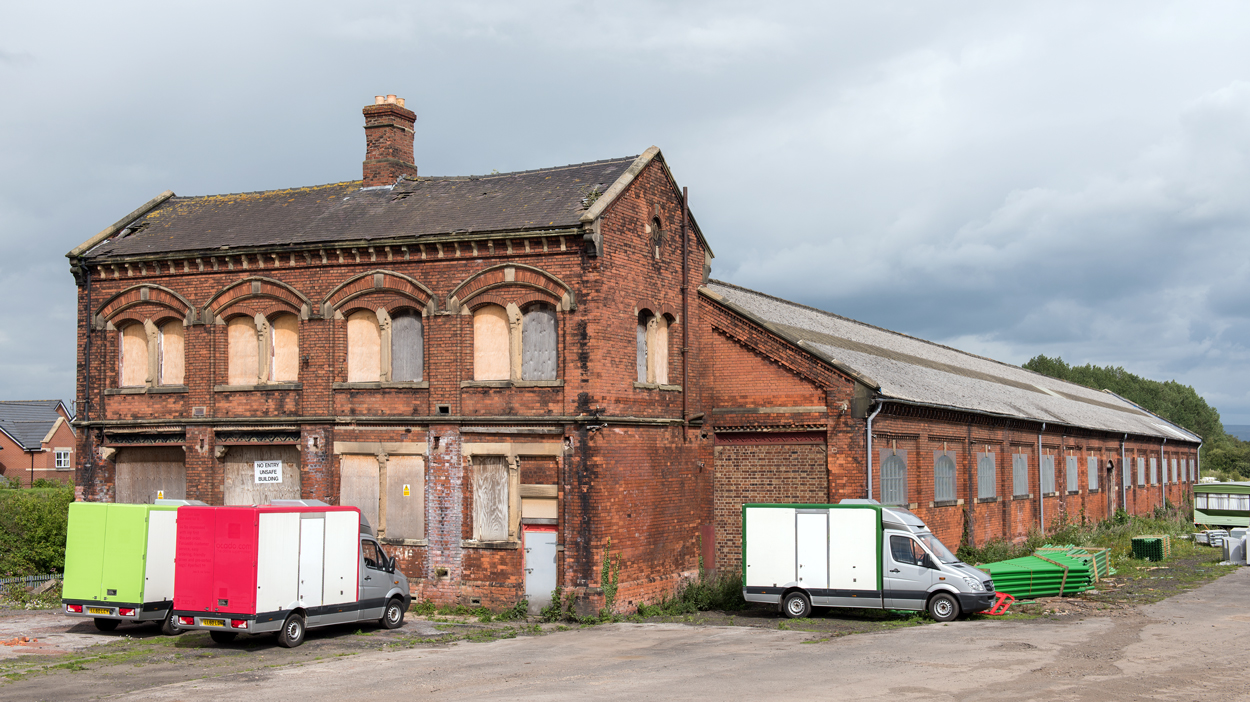

General information
- Location: Carlisle; Cumberland; England
- Platforms: ?

Other information
- Status: Disused

History
- Original company: Newcastle and Carlisle Railway
- Pre-grouping: North Eastern Railway

Key dates
- 20 July 1836: Opened
- 1 January 1863: Closed
Location

Carlisle London Road railway station was the first to open in Carlisle, Cumbria, England. It was built as a terminus of the Newcastle and Carlisle Railway and opened in 1836, when trains could only run as far as Greenhead; not until 1838 was it possible to travel by rail all the way to Gateshead.

When the Lancaster and Carlisle Railway (L&C) reached Carlisle in 1846 it used London Road station for nine months as a temporary expedient before the opening of Carlisle Citadel railway station. The Maryport and Carlisle Railway (M&C) ran some trains to London Road as well as its own Carlisle station at Crown Street. In 1849, the L&C enforced an agreement the M&C had undertaken to sell Crown Street to allow full development of Citadel; the L&C then rapidly demolished Crown Street, and the M&C used London Road as its Carlisle terminus until 1851, after which its trains ran to Citadel.

The Newcastle and Carlisle was amalgamated with the North Eastern Railway (NER) in 1862; the following year, passenger services to London Road ceased, the Newcastle service now running to Citadel. London Road continued to operate as a goods station for the NER.

It was situated just off London Road, and trains of the Settle-Carlisle Line and the Tyne Valley Line still pass immediately to the south of the site of the former station.

| Preceding station | Disused railways | Following station |
|---|---|---|
| Terminus | North Eastern Railway; Newcastle and Carlisle Railway | Scotby |
