= Floriston =

Floriston may refer to:

- Floriston, California, census-designated place in Nevada County, California
- Floriston railway station, railway station in the English county of Cumbria
