= Cumwhinton =

Village in Cumbria, England

Coordinates: 54.867°N 2.854°W

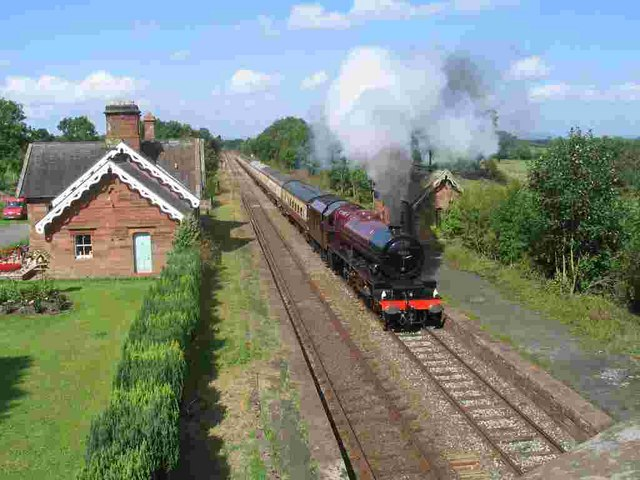
- Railway Station, now a private residence

- Location in the former City of Carlisle district, Cumbria Location within Cumbria
- OS grid reference: NY451528
- Civil parish: Wetheral
- Unitary authority: Cumberland
- Ceremonial county: Cumbria
- Region: North West
- Country: England
- Sovereign state: United Kingdom
- Post town: CARLISLE
- Postcode district: CA4
- Dialling code: 01228
- Police: Cumbria
- Fire: Cumbria
- Ambulance: North West
- UK Parliament: Carlisle

Cumwhinton is a small village in Cumbria, England. It is around one mile away from both Scotby and Wetheral, and four miles from Carlisle. The village lies in Wetheral civil parish.

== History and facilities ==
A hamlet was established at Cumwhinton by the middle of the 12th century, initially under the name Cumquintina, believed to be named after Saint Quentin. The site also had a manor owned by the Bavin family, who gave it to Lanercost Priory after three generations of ownership.

By 1831, Cumwhinton was a joint township with nearby Cotehill, also in Wetheral parish, and had a population of 472.

Cumwhinton is a small village by local standards. Despite its small size, it is home to a pub a village hall and a cafe.

Cumwhinton Primary School provides educational facilities for children in the village. In 2008 a new extension was opened for pupils with autism, one of only four in the county; the building was unveiled by footballer Matt Jansen, a former pupil at the school.

Cumwhinton is often confused with the village of Cumwhitton a few miles to the east.

=== Railway station ===
Cumwhinton had a railway station on the Settle-Carlisle Railway between Scotby and Cotehill, but this was closed to passengers in 1956. The station was designed by the Midland Railway company architect John Holloway Sanders. The station building, which dates from 1875 and remains in use as a private dwelling (the platforms and former waiting shelter also survive), was Grade II listed in 1984.

Preceding station	Historical railways	Following station
Cotehill	Midland Railway; Settle-Carlisle Railway	Scotby

== See also ==
- Listed buildings in Wetheral
