= Listed buildings in Rockcliffe, Cumbria =

Rockcliffe is a civil parish in the Cumberland district of Cumbria, England. It contains 16 buildings that are recorded in the National Heritage List for England. Of these, one is listed at Grade I, the highest of the three grades, two are at Grade II*, the middle grade, and the others are at Grade II, the lowest grade. The parish contains the villages of Rockcliffe and Harker, and the surrounding countryside. The listed buildings include houses and associated structures, farmhouses and farm buildings, a church with a mediaeval cross in the churchyard, a public house, and a milestone.

== Key ==
Grade	Criteria
I	Buildings of exceptional interest, sometimes considered to be internationally important
II*	Particularly important buildings of more than special interest
II	Buildings of national importance and special interest

== Buildings ==
Name and location	Photograph	Date	Notes	Grade
Churchyard cross 54.94505°N 3.00237°W		10th century	The cross is in the churchyard of St Mary's Church. It is in calciferous sandstone and is very weathered. The cross consists of a shaft with two broad bands, and is decorated with dragons and interlace, and at the top is a wheel-head cross. The cross is also a Scheduled Monument.	I
The Old Hall; 54.94793°N 3.00940°W	—	c. 1730	The house was extended and altered in the 20th century. It is rendered, with stone dressings, a moulded cornice, and a green slate roof with coped gables. There are two storeys and three bays, and a two-storey three-bay extension to the right. The round-headed doorway has a moulded surround with springers, a false keystone, and a radial fanlight. The windows in the original part are sashes with moulded stone sills, and in the extension they are casements with wooden surrounds.	II
Harker Lodge and outbuildings 54.93801°N 2.94572°W	—	Mid 18th century	A brick house on a chamfered stone plinth, with quoins, a string course, a moulded wooden eaves cornice with wooden modillions, and a hipped Welsh slate roof. There are two storeys and five bays. At the entrance are four Tuscan columns, with a moulded and ornamented entablature. The windows are sashes with flat brick arches and stone sills. Flanking the house are outbuildings that have gable ends forming pedimented pavilions. Behind the house is an earlier two-storey three-bay house.	II
Town Head; 54.94413°N 3.00012°W	—	Mid 18th century	A stuccoed house on a chamfered stone plinth, with stone dressings, quoins, a modillioned cornice with a parapet, and a slate roof. There are three storeys and three bays. The doorway is flanked by engaged Doric columns, and has a block entablature, an open moulded pediment, and a radial fanlight. The windows in the lower two floors are sashes in moulded surrounds, and in the top floor they are casements. In the roof is a gabled door.	II
Garristown and outbuildings 54.96995°N 3.01436°W	—	Late 18th century	The farmhouse and outbuildings are in brick with a Welsh slate roof, and have two storeys. The house has three bays, the extension to the right has three bays, and an outbuilding further to the right also has three bays. The doorway has an alternate block surround, and the windows are sashes. In the outbuilding are two entrances with segmental heads, and ventilation slits.	II
Milestone; 54.94037°N 2.94427°W	—	1793 (probable)	The milestone was provided for the Carlisle to Longtown Turnpike. It is in sandstone with a rounded top, and carries a recessed circular cast iron plate inscribed with the distance in miles to Carlisle.	II
Becklands; 54.94312°N 2.99471°W	—	Late 18th or early 19th century	A former farmhouse in brick that has a slate roof with coped gables. There are two storeys, three bays, and a two-storey two-bay extension. The doorway has a surround of pilaster strips, an open moulded pediment, and a radial fanlight. The windows are sashes with flat brick arches and stone sills.	II
Castletown; 54.94918°N 3.01943°W	—	1809–11	A country house that was extended and turned round in 1851–52. It is in calciferous sandstone on a chamfered plinth, and has angle pilaster strips, a moulded cornice, a parapet, and a hipped green slate roof. The main part has two storeys and five bays, with flanking pedimented wings of two storeys and two bays. To the right are extensions of two storeys and one bay, and of one storey and three bays. On the garden front is a stepped tetrastyle portico with square columns, a moulded cornice, and a cast iron balcony. The doorway has a round-headed patterned fanlight, the windows in the ground floor are casements, and elsewhere they are sashes. The rear entrance is flanked by two Doric columns.	II*
Gates, piers and walls, Castletown; 54.95000°N 3.01533°W	—	1811 (probable)	Around the entrance to the drive are six stone piers with vase finials. On each side of the drive, these are joined by serpentine shaped sandstone walls with cast iron speared railings. The gates are re-set on steel pillars behind the original piers.	II
Lodge, Castletown; 54.94967°N 3.01556°W	—	1811 (probable)	The lodge is in calciferous sandstone on a chamfered plinth, and has quoins and a slate roof. There is a single storey and two bays. On the front is a tetrastyle pedimented portico with squared columns, and a moulded entablature with a carved coat of arms. Above the door is a fanlight, and the windows are sashes with pilaster strip surrounds.	II
Crown and Thistle Public House; 54.94428°N 3.00126°W		Early 19th century	The public house was extended in the 20th century; it is stuccoed and has a Welsh slate roof. There are two storeys and three bays, a single-storey two-bay extension to the left, and a two-storey two-bay landlord's house to the right. Both the original part and the extension have brick porches and sash windows. The landlord's house has a doorway with a stone surround, sash windows, and gabled dormers.	II
Floriston Rigg, outbuildings and gin gang 54.96827°N 3.00259°W	—	Early 19th century	The farmhouse and outbuildings are in sandstone with Welsh slate roofs. The farmhouse has two storeys and three bays, and a doorway and sash windows with stone surrounds. To the right is a two-storey two-bay outbuilding with a hipped roof. To the left, giving an L-shaped plan, is another two-storey outbuilding containing plank doors and ventilation slits. To the left of this is a lean-to single-storey gin gang with a hipped roof.	II
Garden Cottage; 54.93856°N 2.94687°W	—	Early 19th century	Originally a gardener's cottage for Harker Lodge, it has rendered walls and a Welsh slate roof. There is one storey and three bays. The doorway has a stone surround, a moulded cornice, and a fanlight, and the windows are sashes with stone sills.	II
Garden wall, Harker Lodge; 54.93864°N 2.94762°W	—	Early 19th century	This is a high wall enclosing the garden of Harker Lodge on two sides. It is in brick and has stone coping.	II
Harker Farmhouse; 54.93879°N 2.94669°W	—	Early 19th century	A brick house with a Welsh slate roof, in two storeys and three bays. Above the door is a fanlight. The doorway and sash windows have plain surrounds and hood moulds.	II
St Mary's Church; 54.94532°N 3.00249°W		1848	The church, designed by James Steward, is in Decorated style. The spire was completed in 1881, and was rebuilt in 1901 following a lightning strike. The church is built in calciferous sandstone on a chamfered plinth, and has angle buttresses, string courses, a decorated cornice, and a green slate roof with coped gables and cross finials. It consists of a nave with a north transept (originally a family chapel), a chancel, and a southwest steeple incorporating a porch. The tower is in three stages, and has an entrance with a pointed arch and a moulded surround, and a broach spire with lucarnes and a weathervane.	II*

== Sources ==
- Historic England, "Churchyard Cross, south of Church of St Mary, Rockcliffe (1138346)", National Heritage List for England
- Historic England, "Rockcliffe Cross (1007169)", National Heritage List for England
- Historic England, "The Old Hall, Rockcliffe (1146312)", National Heritage List for England
- Historic England, "Harker Lodge and adjoining outbuildings, Rockcliffe (1087592)", National Heritage List for England
- Historic England, "Town Head, Rockcliffe (1087595)", National Heritage List for England
- Historic England, "Garristown and adjoining outbuildings, Rockcliffe (1087597)", National Heritage List for England
- Historic England, "Milestone at NGR NY 39610 61400, Rockcliffe (1335570)", National Heritage List for England
- Historic England, "Becklands, Rockcliffe (1138326)", National Heritage List for England
- Historic England, "Castletown, Rockcliffe (1087596)", National Heritage List for England
- Historic England, "Gates, piers and walls east of Castletown, Rockcliffe (1335572)", National Heritage List for England
- Historic England, "Lodge to east of Castletown, Rockcliffe (1146345)", National Heritage List for England
- Historic England, "The Crown and Thistle Public House, Rockcliffe (1335571)", National Heritage List for England
- Historic England, "Floriston Rigg and adjoining outbuildings with gin gang, Rockcliffe (1146356)", National Heritage List for England
- Historic England, "Garden Cottage, Rockcliffe (1087593)", National Heritage List for England
- Historic England, "Garden wall to north west of Harker Lodge, Rockcliffe (1335569)", National Heritage List for England
- Historic England, "Harker Farmhouse, Rockcliffe (1087591)", National Heritage List for England
- Historic England, "Church of St Mary, Rockcliffe (1087594)", National Heritage List for England
- Historic England, Listed Buildings
- Hyde, Matthew; Pevsner, Nikolaus (2010) [1967], Cumbria, The Buildings of England, New Haven and London: Yale University Press, ISBN 978-0-300-12663-1
