= Rockliffe =

Rockliffe may refer to:

== People ==
- Rockliffe Fellowes (1883–1950), Canadian actor
- David Lunn-Rockliffe (1924–2011), British businessman
- Thornton Rockliffe (1887–1961), Australian cricketer

== Others ==
- Rockliffe Park, training facility of Middlesbrough F.C.
- Rockliffe (TV series), British TV series

== See also ==
- Rockcliff (disambiguation)
- Rockcliffe (disambiguation)
- Rockliff
