= Parkhouse Halt railway station =

Disused railway station in Carlisle, Cumbria

Parkhouse Halt
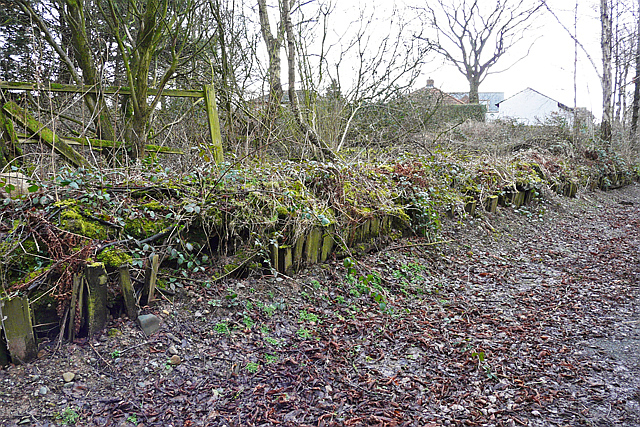
- The remains of one of the platforms in 2018

General information
- Location: Cumbria; England
- Coordinates: 54.9318°N 2.959°W
- Grid reference: NY386601
- Platforms: 2

Other information
- Status: Disused

History
- Original company: London and North Eastern Railway
- Post-grouping: London and North Eastern Railway; London Midland Region of British Railways

Key dates
- 7 July 1941: Opened
- 6 January 1969: Closed
Location

Parkhouse Halt railway station was built for the nearby RAF Kingstown (later RAF Carlisle) from 1941 to 1969 on the Waverley Line.

== History ==
The station opened on 7 July 1941 by the LNER to serve the workers at the nearby RAF Kingstown depot. The halt was not available to members of the public. Due to this, it was not believed to have nameboards installed. The halt took its name from the nearest large house in the area. It comprised two long, slightly staggered platforms spanned by an iron footbridge, with the main access directly from RAF Kingstown via a path from the north end of the down platform, later supplemented by a second set of steps from the footbridge. The platforms were of earth and cinder construction faced with timber, with a brick waiting shelter and booking office on the up platform, and electric lighting carried on concrete posts. To the south of the station, a short siding line ran into RAF Kingstown. Although in the 1960s the halt was listed as a stop for northbound trains on indicators at Carlisle Citadel station, it did not appear in public timetables. It did, however, appear on public closure notices in 1969. After closure, the trackbed to the south became the Kingmoor nature reserve. The degraded up platform remains extant. The halt closed on 6 January 1969 along with the line.
