= Todhills, Cumbria =

Village in England

Coordinates: 54.956°N 2.985°W

Todhills
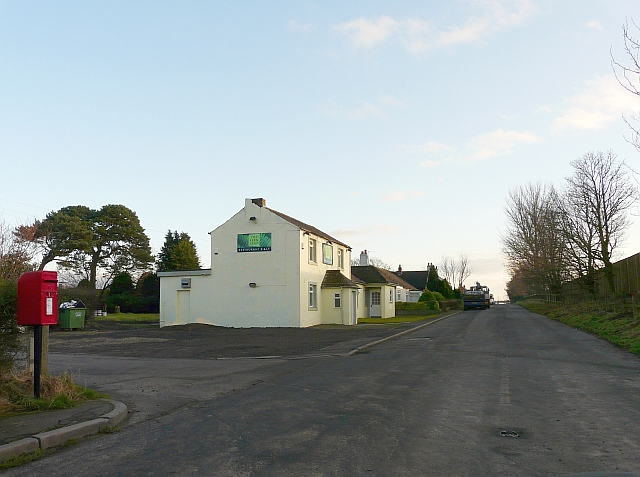
- The Fern Leaf public house, Todhills

- Location in the former Carlisle district, Cumbria Location within Cumbria
- OS grid reference: NY369628
- Civil parish: Rockcliffe; Westlinton
- Unitary authority: Cumberland
- Ceremonial county: Cumbria
- Region: North West
- Country: England
- Sovereign state: United Kingdom
- Post town: CARLISLE
- Postcode district: CA6
- Dialling code: 01228
- Police: Cumbria
- Fire: Cumbria
- Ambulance: North West
- UK Parliament: Carlisle

Todhills is a small village near Carlisle, Cumbria, England. The village's name is from Old English tota-hyll "look-out hill". Located north of Carlisle, nestled between the border city and Gretna, Todhills is so small that it really is known as a hamlet and not a village. Amongst the houses there is a pub, a post box and a telephone box.
