= Harker railway station =

Disused railway station in Harker, Cumbria

Harker
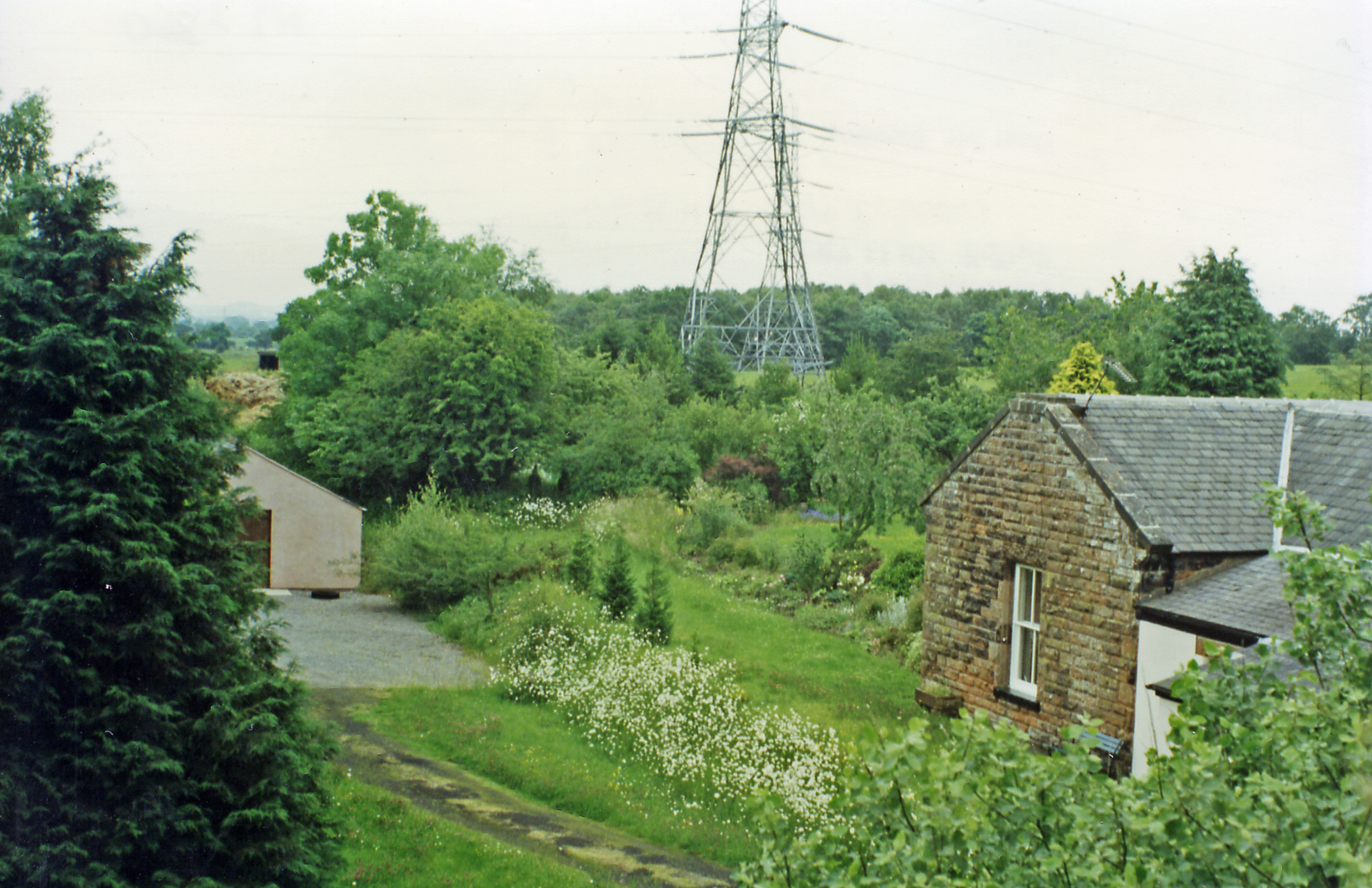
- The site of the station, looking north towards Harker, in 1997

General information
- Location: Harker, Cumbria; England
- Coordinates: 54.939°N 2.9603°W
- Grid reference: NY385605
- Platforms: 2

Other information
- Status: Disused

History
- Original company: Border Union Railway
- Pre-grouping: North British Railway
- Post-grouping: LNER; LMR

Key dates
- 29 October 1861: First station opened
- 1 November 1929: Closed
- 1 March 1943: New unadvertised station opened south of first station
- 6 January 1969: Closed
Location
- Location within the former City of Carlisle district Location within Cumbria

Harker railway station served the settlement of Harker, Cumbria, England, between 1861 and 1969 on the Waverley Line.

== History ==
The first station was opened on 29 October 1861 by the North British Railway to the north of on an unnamed minor road . It closed on 1 November 1929 but was used as an unadvertised halt for military personnel to the nearby airfield from 1936 until circa 1941. A new unadvertised station for RAF staff was opened on 1 March 1943 by the LNER on the other side of the bridge from the first station. Near the station was an RAF stores depot, which was the reason why the station opened. The short platforms could not be extended because the goods yard, to the north, was still in use. The depot was renamed from RAF Kingston to RAF Carlisle and was home to the 14 maintenance unit. It was used to store equipment from aircraft parts to firearms, ammunition and aircrew clothing. The station closed on 6 January 1969 along with the line. RAF Carlisle closed in 1996 and was unoccupied until 2010 when the Stobart group acquired it.

Preceding station	Disused railways	Following station
Lyneside; Line and station closed	LNER; Waverley Line	Parkhouse Halt; Line and station closed
