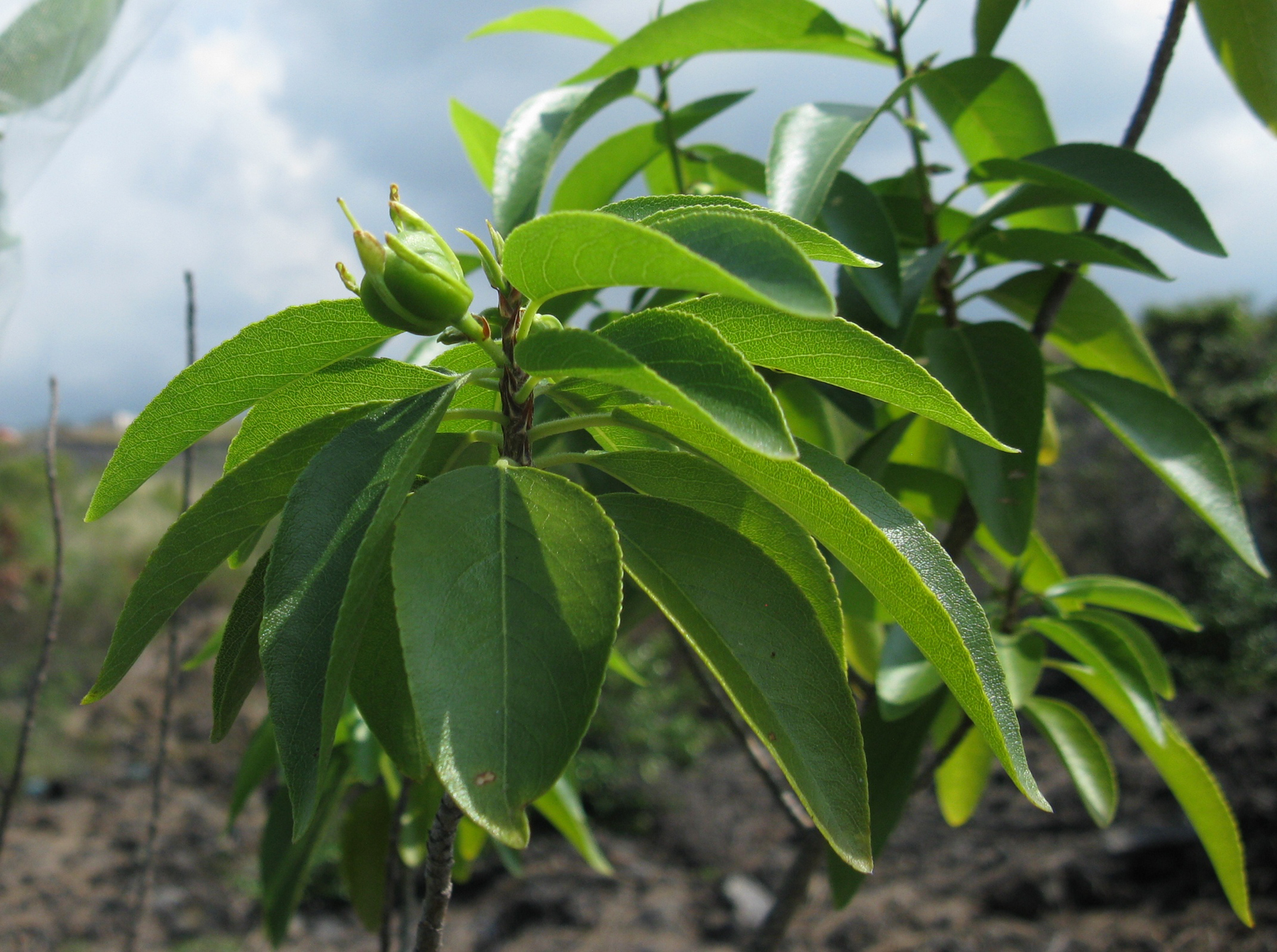

Conservation status
- Critically Imperiled (NatureServe)

Scientific classification
- Kingdom: Plantae
- Clade: Tracheophytes
- Clade: Angiosperms
- Clade: Eudicots
- Clade: Rosids
- Order: Malpighiales
- Family: Violaceae
- Genus: Isodendrion
- Species: I. pyrifolium

Binomial name
- Isodendrion pyrifolium A.Gray

= Isodendrion pyrifolium =

Species of flowering plant

Isodendrion pyrifolium is a rare species of flowering plant in the violet family known by the common name wahine noho kula. It is endemic to Hawaii, where it is known only from the island of Hawaii. It is a federally listed endangered species of the United States.

This is a shrub growing 0.8 to 2 meters tall and bearing greenish yellow flowers.

This shrub is thought to have occurred on at least 6 of the Hawaiian Islands. It was not seen after 1870 and was believed extinct until 1991, when it was rediscovered in Hawaii. There was a population of about 60 plants near Kailua. By 2007 most of these had died, leaving only three wild specimens in existence. These are located in degraded dry forest habitat in an area undergoing development. A few more individuals have been planted in appropriate habitat nearby.

The plants' habitat is threatened by development, and non-native plant species such as fountain grass (Pennisetum setaceum), which increases the risk of fire in the area.
