= Rockliff =

Rockliff is a surname. Notable people with the surname include:

- Jeremy Rockliff (born 1970), Australian politician
- Mara Rockliff, American author
- Tom Rockliff (born 1990), Australian rules footballer

== See also ==
- Rockcliff (disambiguation)
- Rockcliffe (disambiguation)
- Rockliffe (disambiguation)
