= Harker, Cumbria =

Settlement in England

Coordinates: 54.938°N 2.944°W

Harker
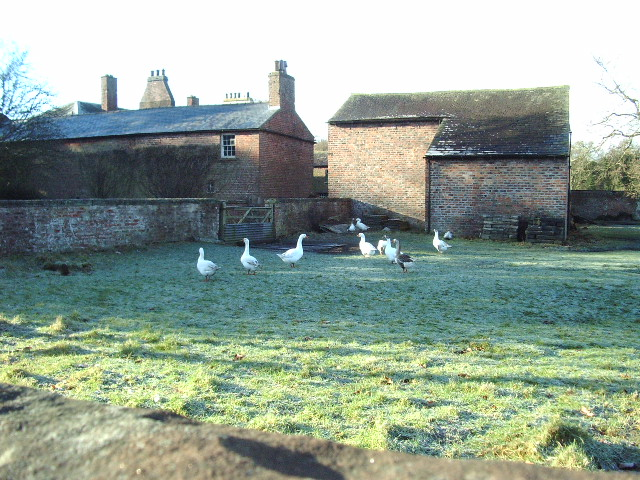
- Geese at Harker

- Location in the former Carlisle district, Cumbria Location within Cumbria
- OS grid reference: NY395607
- Civil parish: Rockcliffe
- Unitary authority: Cumberland
- Ceremonial county: Cumbria
- Region: North West
- Country: England
- Sovereign state: United Kingdom
- Post town: CARLISLE
- Postcode district: CA6
- Dialling code: 01228
- Police: Cumbria
- Fire: Cumbria
- Ambulance: North West
- UK Parliament: Carlisle

Harker is a settlement in the parish of Rockcliffe, in the Cumberland district, in the county of Cumbria, England. Harker is located along the A7 road on the Solway Plain. Harker is situated approximately two miles north of the course of Hadrian's Wall.

From 1862, Harker was served by a railway station, sited on the Waverley route that linked Carlisle and Edinburgh. The station was closed to passengers in 1929. It reopened (unstaffed) in 1936 to serve Carlisle airfield and remained intermittently in use, serving local RAF airfield and Maintenance Unit 14MU operations, as well as the local community, until the closure of the line in 1969.

Harker is also associated with the Surname Harker.

== See also ==
- Listed buildings in Rockcliffe, Cumbria
