= Armathwaite railway station =

Railway station in Cumbria, England

Armathwaite
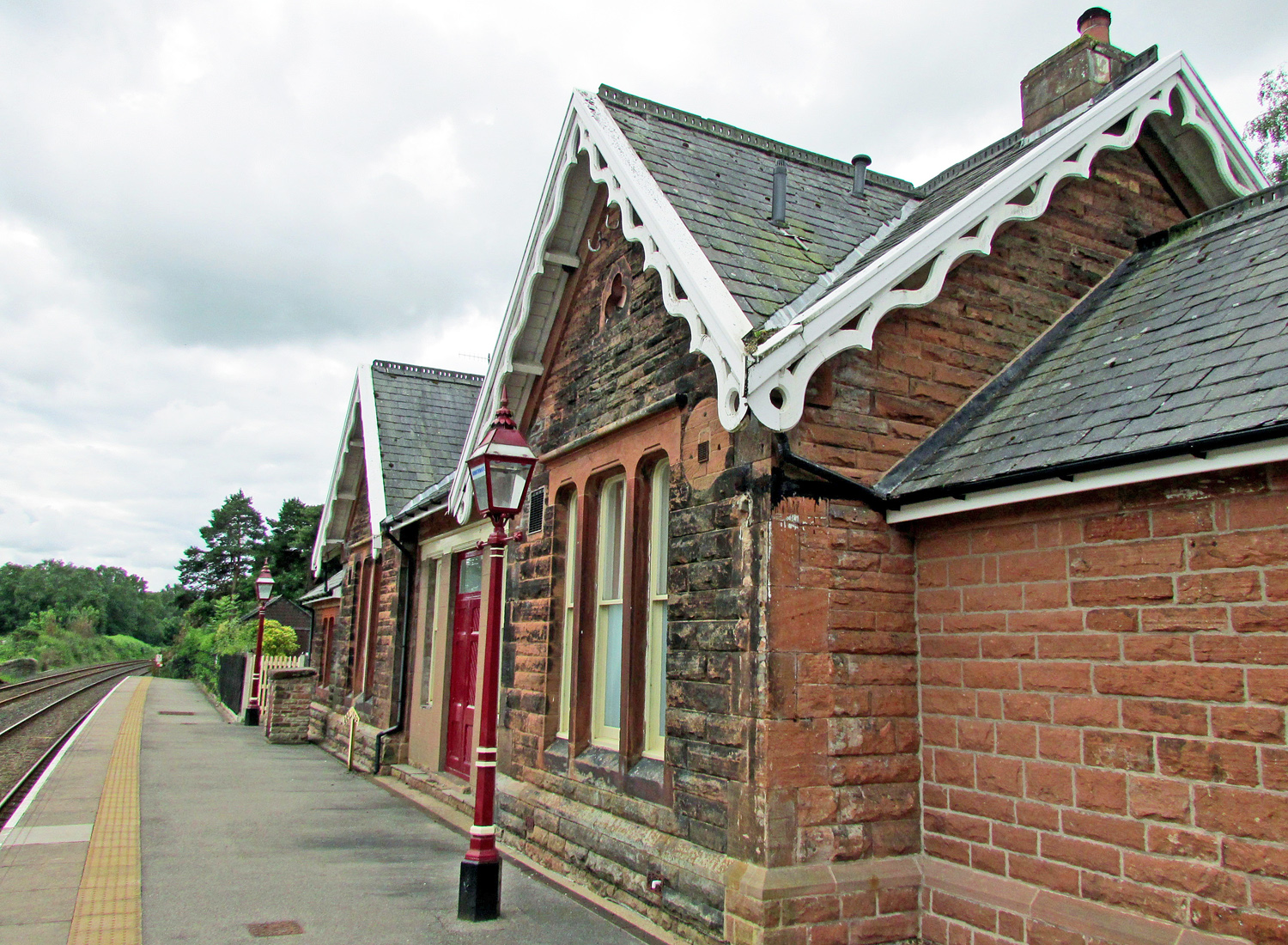

General information
- Location: Armathwaite, Westmorland and Furness; England
- Coordinates: 54°48′34″N 2°46′20″W
- Grid reference: NY504463
- Owner: Network Rail
- Operator: Northern Trains
- Platforms: 2
- Tracks: 2

Construction
- Architect: John Holloway Sanders

Other information
- Station code: AWT
- Classification: DfT category F2

History
- Original company: Midland Railway
- Pre-grouping: Midland Railway
- Post-grouping: London, Midland and Scottish Railway; British Rail (London Midland Region)

Key dates
- 1 May 1876: Opened
- 5 May 1970: Closed
- 14 July 1986: Reopened

Passengers
- 2021/22: ▲6,988
- 2022/23: ▲8,430
- 2023/24: ▲11,432
- 2024/25: ▲13,282
- 2025/26: ▲13,958
Location
- Location within the former Eden District Location within Cumbria
Notes
- Passenger statistics from the Office of Rail and Road

Armathwaite is a railway station on the Settle and Carlisle Line, which runs between Carlisle and Leeds via Settle. The station, situated 9 miles 75 chains (16 km) south-east of Carlisle, serves the village of Armathwaite, in Cumbria, England. It is owned by Network Rail and managed by Northern Trains.

== History ==
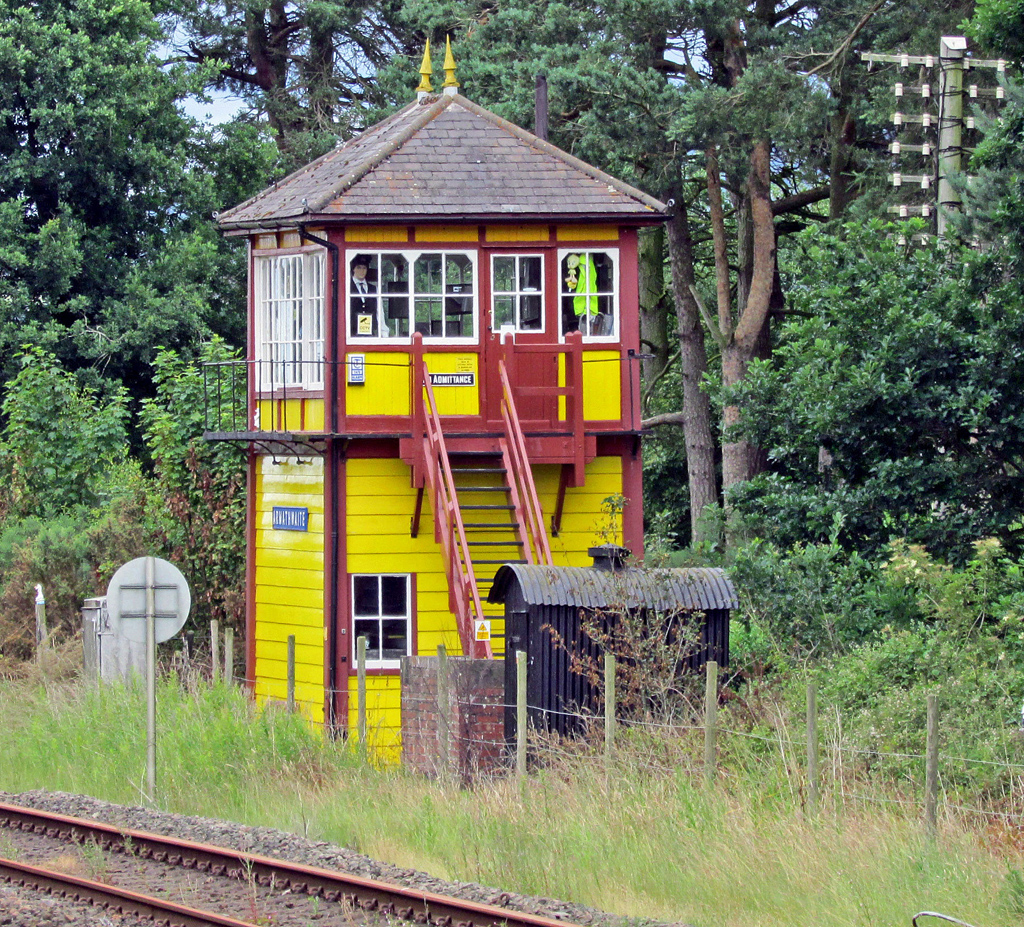
The station's signal box was constructed by the Midland Railway in 1899 and restored in 1992

The station was opened by the Midland Railway on 1 May 1876. It was designed by company architect, John Holloway Sanders. The original station building, now a private house, is a medium-sized style station built from local red sandstone.

Following the closure of Cotehill, Cumwhinton and Scotby in the 1950s, the station now serves as the final stop on the Settle & Carlisle line, prior to reaching the terminus at Carlisle.

The station was closed by British Rail on 2 May 1970, when local passenger trains ceased operating on the route. It was reopened on 14 July 1986. By then, the original station building on the Carlisle-bound platform had been sold for private use, so a passenger shelter was built at the northern end of the platform. A brick-built passenger waiting room exists on the Leeds-bound platform.

The station's signal box was built by the Midland Railway and placed in service on 16 July 1899. It was equipped with a 16-lever tumbler frame. The box was decommissioned on 15 January 1983. During 1992, it was restored by the Friends of the Settle to Carlisle Line. The refurbishment saw the signal box furnished with original Midland Railway block instruments and painted in original colours. It can be visited on Sundays by prior arrangement.

=== Accidents and incidents ===
- Services between Armathwaite and Carlisle were suspended from 9 February 2016, due to a landslip north of the station at Eden Brows. The station served as the northern terminus of the Settle & Carlisle line until 30 March 2017, when the £23 million project to repair the embankment and reinstate the track bed was completed by Network Rail.

== Facilities ==
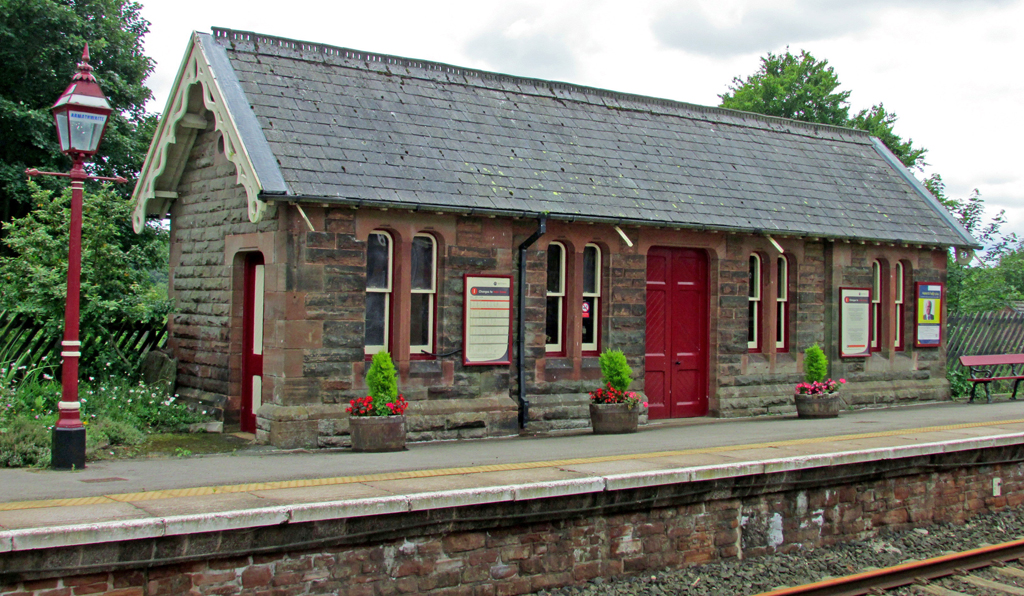
Waiting room on the Leeds-bound platform

The station has two platforms, both of which have seating, waiting shelter (southbound only), next train audio and visual displays and an emergency help point. Platforms can be accessed from the car park (northbound) or nearby road (southbound), and do not have step-free access. There is a small car park at the station.

== Services ==
As at May 2023, the station is served by eight trains per day (six on Sunday) towards Carlisle. Heading towards Leeds via Settle, there are seven trains per day (six on Sunday). All services are operated by Northern Trains.

Preceding station	National Rail	Following station
Lazonby & Kirkoswald	Northern Trains; Settle & Carlisle line	Carlisle
	Historical railways	
Lazonby & Kirkoswald	Midland Railway; Settle & Carlisle line	Cotehill
