= Isodendrion longifolium =

Conservation status
- Imperiled (NatureServe)

Scientific classification
- Kingdom: Plantae
- Clade: Tracheophytes
- Clade: Angiosperms
- Clade: Eudicots
- Clade: Rosids
- Order: Malpighiales
- Family: Violaceae
- Genus: Isodendrion
- Species: I. longifolium

Binomial name
- Isodendrion longifolium A.Gray

Species of flowering plant

Isodendrion longifolium is a rare species of flowering plant in the violet family known by the common names longleaf isodendrion and aupaka. It is endemic to Hawaii, where it is known from fewer than 1000 individuals on the islands of Kauai and Oahu. It is a federally listed threatened species of the United States.

This is a shrub growing 0.6 to 2 meters tall. It has lance-shaped, leathery leaves up to 30 centimeters long and produces fragrant purple flowers.

This shrub grows in moist and wet forest habitat. There are fewer than 50 individuals remaining on Oahu, and the plant is slightly more abundant on Kauai.

The plants' habitat is threatened by feral ungulates including wild boars. Another threat is competition with non-native plant species.
