= Isodendrion hosakae =

Conservation status
- Critically Imperiled (NatureServe)

Scientific classification
- Kingdom: Plantae
- Clade: Tracheophytes
- Clade: Angiosperms
- Clade: Eudicots
- Clade: Rosids
- Order: Malpighiales
- Family: Violaceae
- Genus: Isodendrion
- Species: I. hosakae

Binomial name
- Isodendrion hosakae H.St.John

Species of flowering plant

Isodendrion hosakae is a rare species of flowering plant in the violet family known by the common names cindercone isodendrion and aupaka. It is endemic to Hawaii, where it is known from fewer than 1000 individuals on the island of Hawaii. It is a federally listed endangered species of the United States.

This is a shrub growing up to about 80 centimeters in maximum height. The lance-shaped leaves are about 2.5 centimeters long. It produces fragrant greenish yellow flowers each about 1.3 centimeters long.

This shrub only grows in cinder cones within a 2.4-kilometer radius area on the island of Hawaii. The total area occupied by the plant is about 0.8 hectare. The plants are located on the summits or exposed slopes of the dormant cones, where it is windy and foggy. The plants may obtain a large part of their moisture from the fog.

The plants' habitat is surrounded by rangeland grazed by cattle. A major threat to their survival is predation by the cattle. Feral pigs are also present in the area. The species is threatened by non-native plants, which in turn increase the risk of severe fires, which damage the habitat.

This plant was described and named for its discoverer, Edward Y. Hosaka, in 1952.
