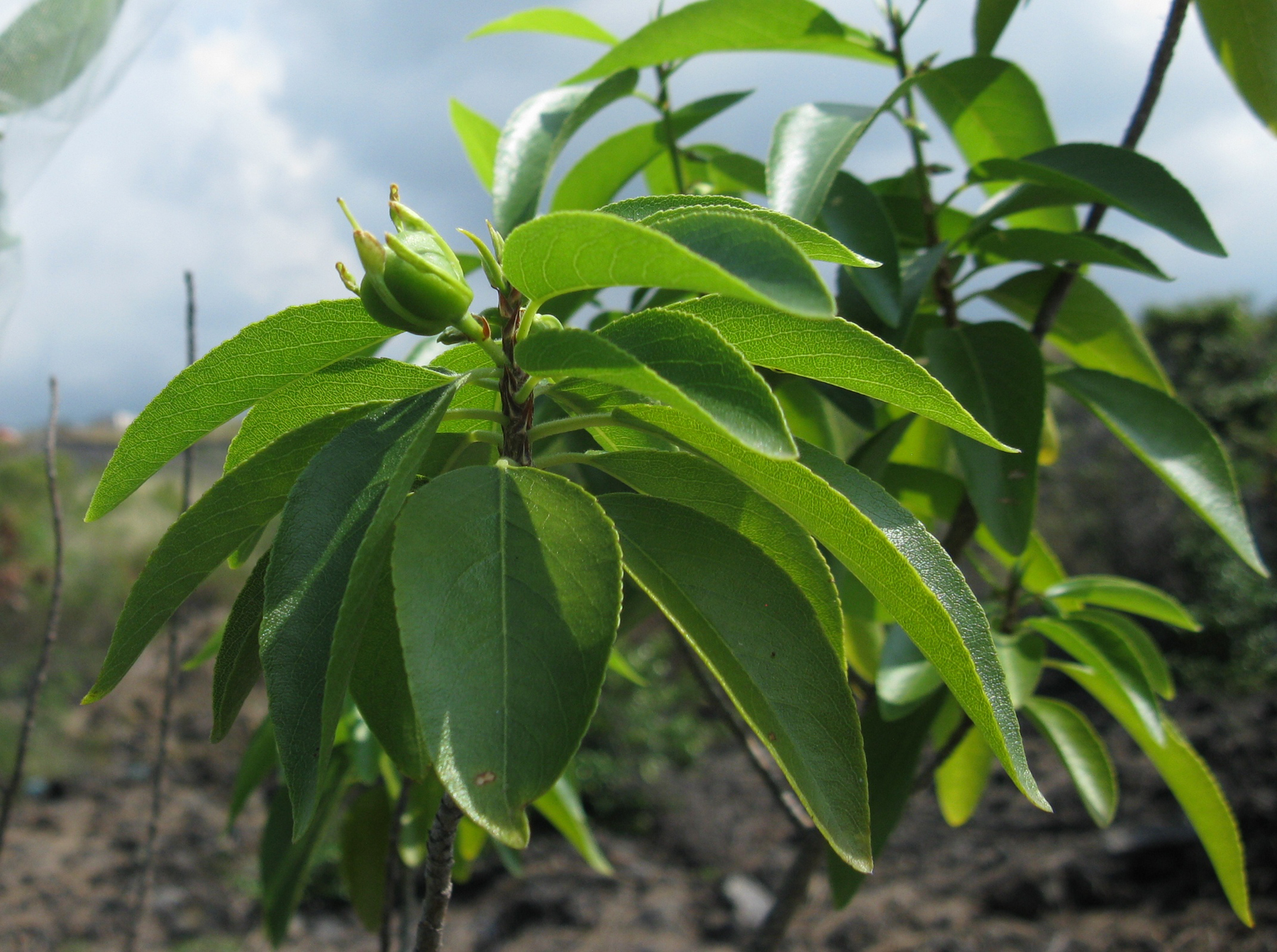
- Isodendrion pyrifolium

Scientific classification
- Kingdom: Plantae
- Clade: Tracheophytes
- Clade: Angiosperms
- Clade: Eudicots
- Clade: Rosids
- Order: Malpighiales
- Family: Violaceae
- Subfamily: Violoideae
- Tribe: Rinoreeae
- Subtribe: Isodendriinae
- Genus: Isodendrion; A.Gray

Species
- See text

= Isodendrion =

Genus of flowering plants

Isodendrion is a plant genus in the family Violaceae. It includes four species native to the Hawaiian Islands.

== Species ==
Plants of the World Online accepts four species. More detailed phylogeny is provided in two papers from 2014 and 2018.

- Isodendrion hosakae H.St.John
- Isodendrion laurifolium A.Gray
- Isodendrion longifolium A.Gray
- Isodendrion pyrifolium A.Gray
