= Floriston railway station =

Former railway station in Cumbria, England

Floriston
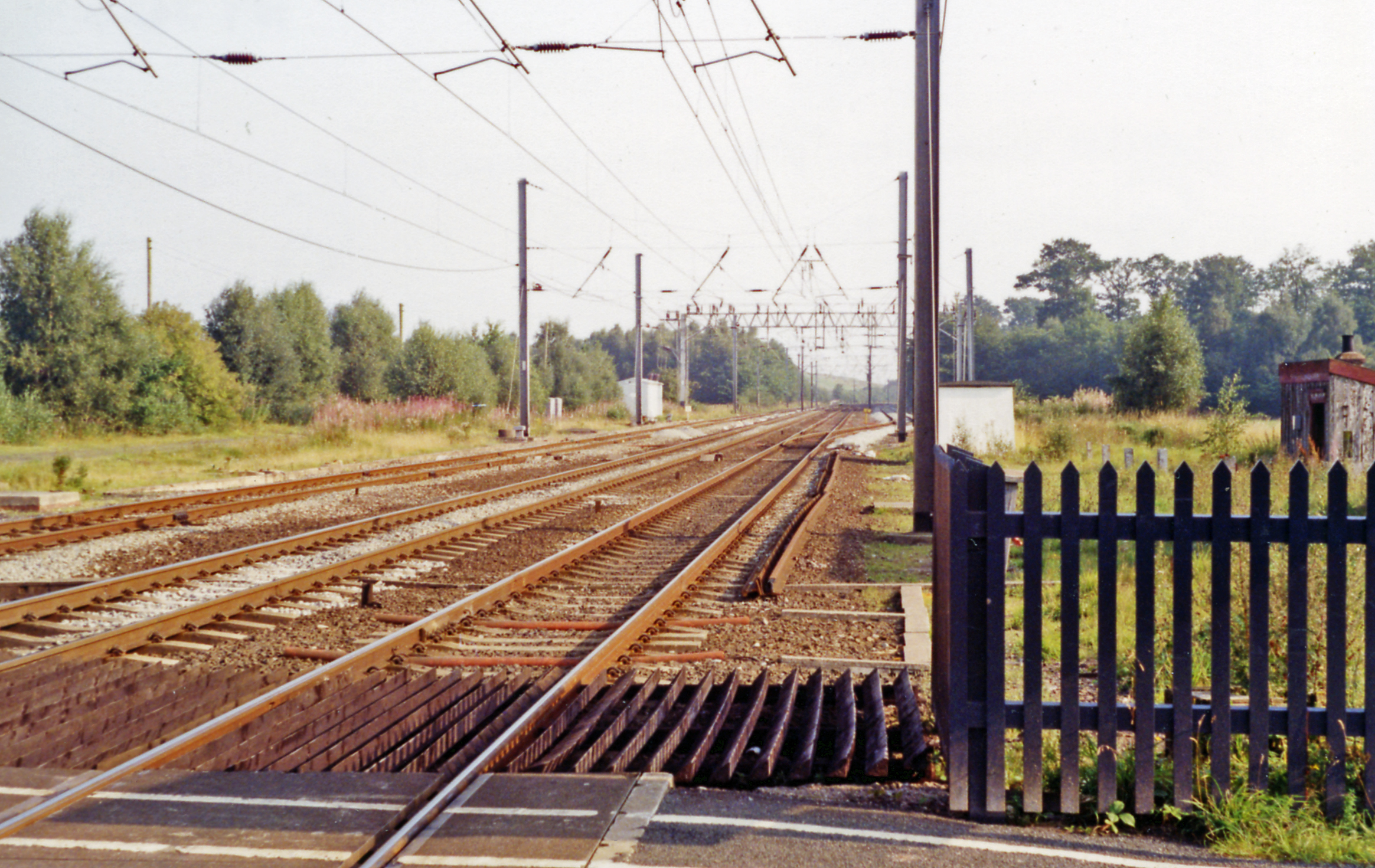
- Site of the station in 1991

General information
- Location: Floristonrigg, Cumbria; England
- Coordinates: 54.9670°N 3.0074°W
- Grid reference: NY3560064072
- Platforms: 2

Other information
- Status: Disused

History
- Original company: Caledonian Railway
- Pre-grouping: Caledonian Railway
- Post-grouping: London Midland and Scottish Railway

Key dates
- 10 September 1847: Station opened
- 17 July 1950: Station closed
Location
- Location within the former City of Carlisle district Location within Cumbria

Floriston railway station was a station which served the rural area around Floristonrigg, Rockcliffe Parish, south of Gretna in the English county of Cumberland (now part of Cumbria). It was served by local trains on what is now known as the West Coast Main Line. The nearest station for Floriston is now at Carlisle.

== History ==
Opened by the Caledonian Railway, it became part of the London Midland and Scottish Railway during the Grouping of 1923 and was then closed by British Railways in 1950.

The station had a few sidings, a signal box on the other side of the level crossing from the platforms, pedestrian overbridge, stationmaster's house, ticket office and a waiting room. The line was double track here, however it is now a triple track section built on the site of one of the platforms, a siding, etc. Floriston was in the vicinity of the bridge over the River Esk.

| Preceding station | Historical railways | Following station |
|---|---|---|
| Rockcliffe; Line open; Station closed | Caledonian Railway; Main Line | Gretna (Caledonian); Line open; Station closed |

== The site today ==
Trains pass at speed on the electrified West Coast Main Line. The station platforms and all other buildings have been demolished, the pedestrian overbridge has also been removed, however the level crossing is still present.
