= Lyneside railway station =

Disused railway station in Westlinton, Cumbria

Lyneside

General information
- Location: Westlinton, Cumbria; England
- Coordinates: 54.970745°N 2.959027°W
- Grid reference: NY387644
- Platforms: 2

Other information
- Status: Disused

History
- Original company: Border Union Railway
- Pre-grouping: North British Railway
- Post-grouping: LNER

Key dates
- 29 October 1861: Opened as West Linton
- 10 October 1870: Name changed to Lineside
- December 1871: Name changed to Lyneside
- 1 November 1929: Closed to passengers
- 5 October 1964: Closed completely
Location

Lyneside railway station served the hamlet of West Linton, Cumbria, England, from 1861 to 1964 on the Waverley Line.

== History ==
The station opened sometime after 29 October 1861, when the line opened, but this date is not confirmed. The original name of the station was West Linton, but it was changed to Lineside on 10 October 1870 and finally changed to Lyneside in December 1871. The River Lyne is near the station site. The station was situated on the north side of an unnamed minor road. There was a single siding with a loop but there was no goods yard. The station closed to passengers on 1 November 1929 and closed completely on 5 October 1964.

Preceding station	Disused railways	Following station
Harker; Line and station closed	LNER; Waverley Line	Longtown; Line and station closed
