= Cotehill railway station =

Former railway station in Cumbria, England

Coordinates: 54.8472°N 2.7961°W

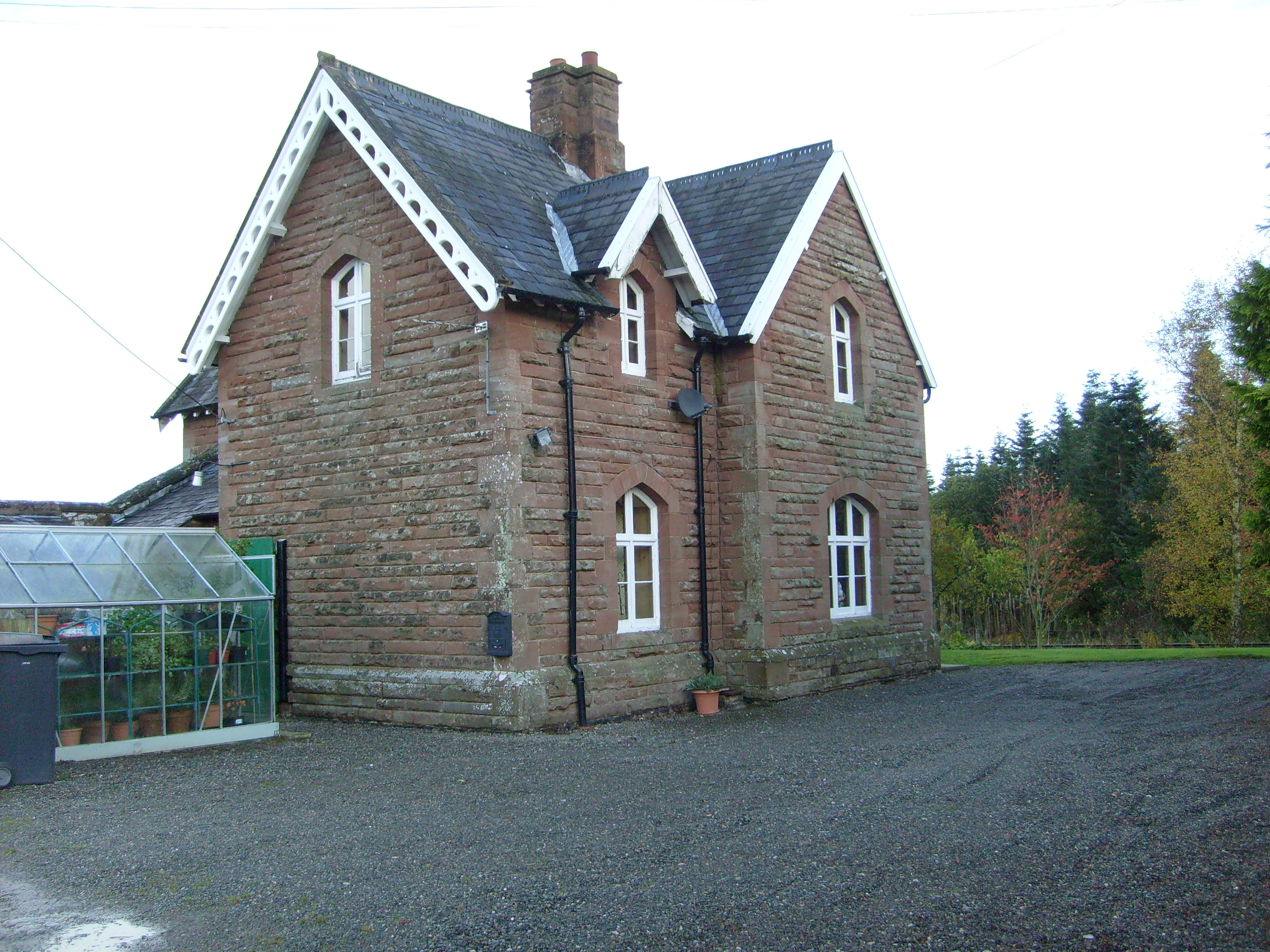
Station master's house at Cotehill Station.

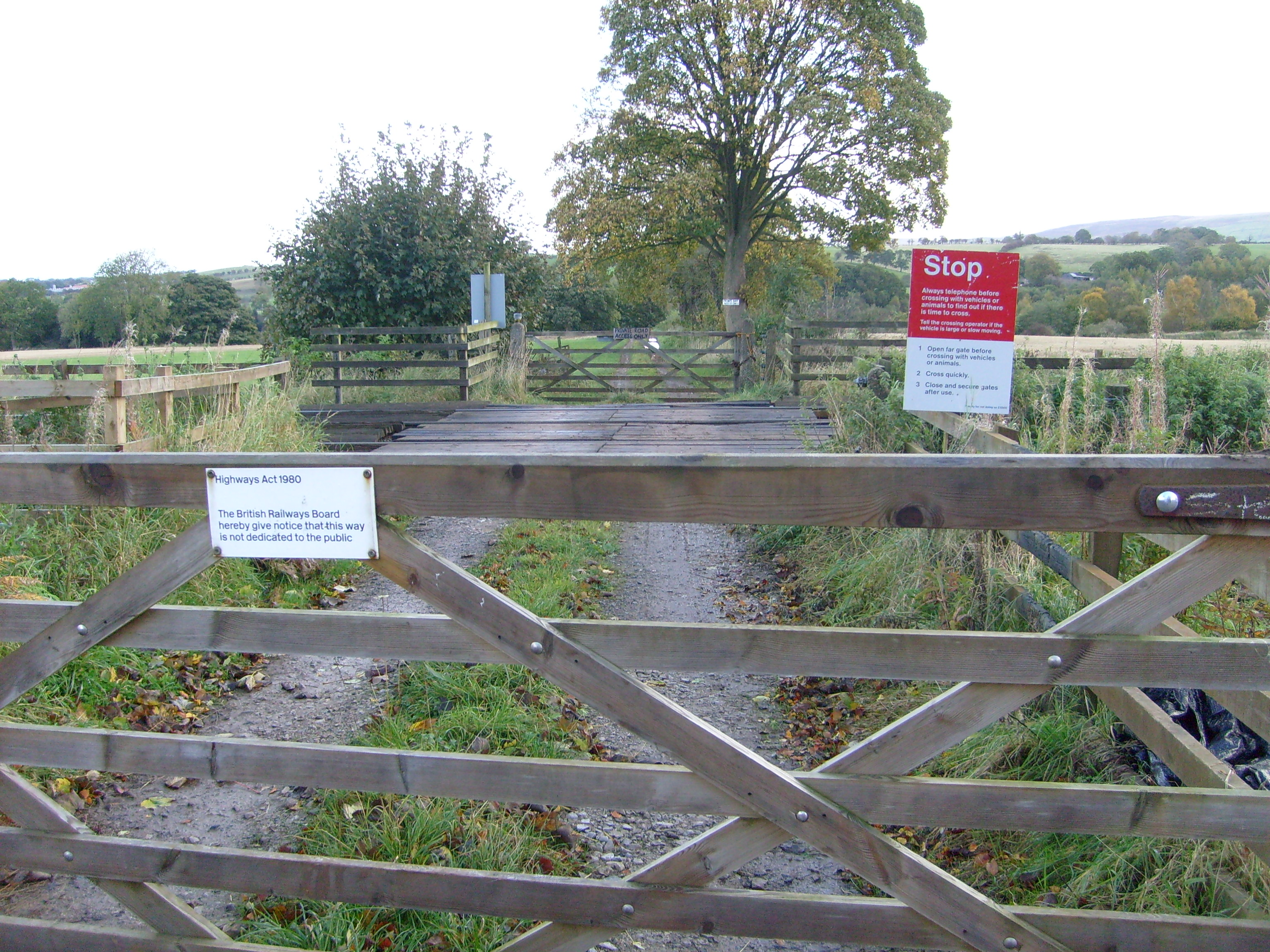
Crossing at Cotehill Station.

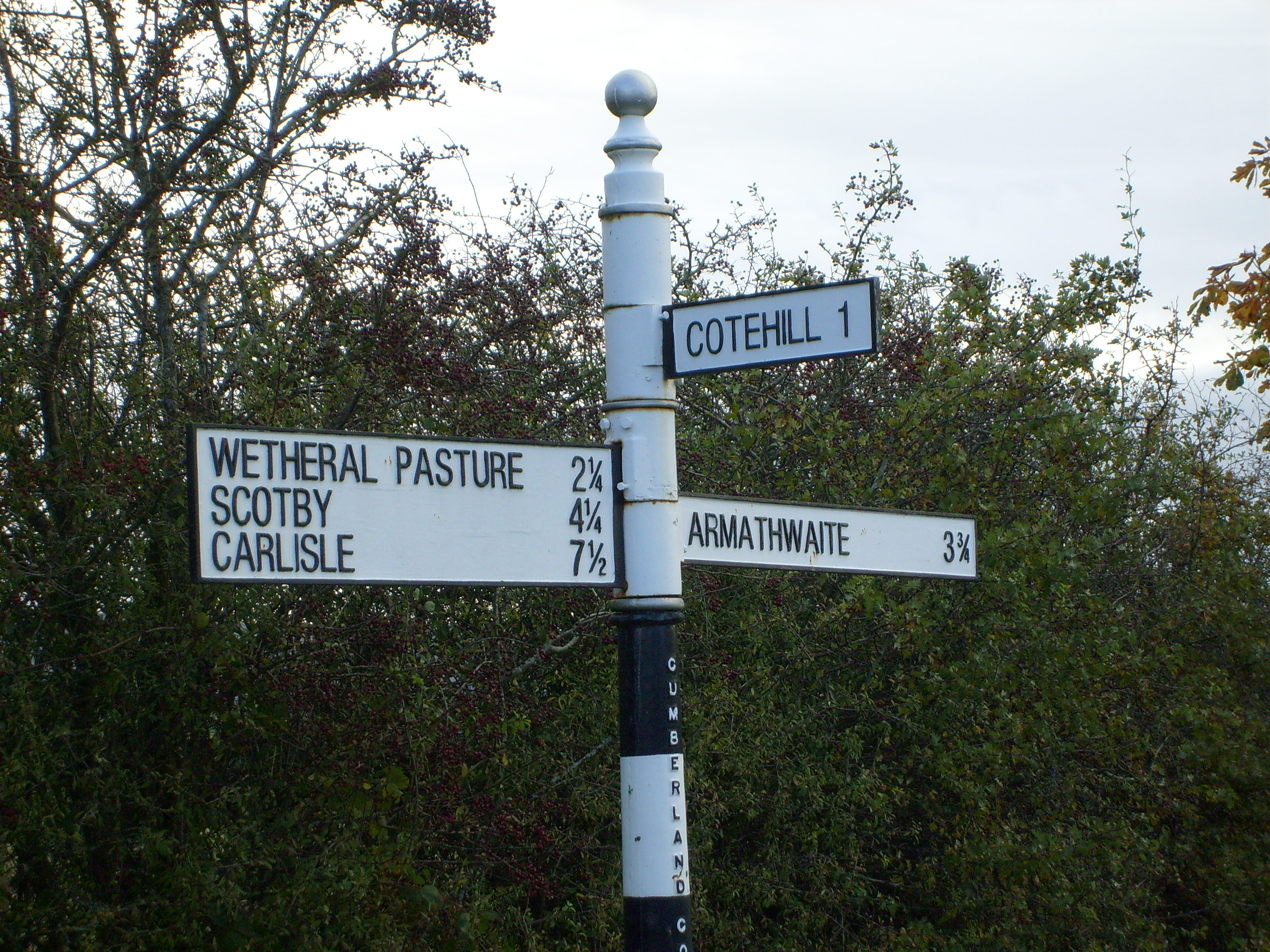
All these villages, near Carlisle, had railway stations. (Wetheral Pasture is adjacent to Cumwhinton).

Cotehill railway station was a railway station on the Settle-Carlisle Railway in England between Armathwaite and Cumwhinton. The line opened for passengers in 1876. The station was designed by the Midland Railway company architect John Holloway Sanders.

The Ordnance Survey map published in the year 1900 shows the station serving the point at which a tramway from Knothill Plaster and Cement Works meets the Settle-Carlisle. The tramway continued from Knothill to Boaterby Quarry. According to Tyler, Knothill was one of the first Gypsum sites in Cumbria.

The station is named after the nearest village, Cotehill, but this is 1.5 miles (2.4 km) away and extremely small. It is closer to the site of Englethwaite Hall which was built by John Thomlinson in 1879 but demolished by 1969, the site now being the location of a Caravan Club campsite. It is clear from the map that the sparse local population could not have sustained a railway station. In addition, the station is only 3.5 miles (5.6 km) from Armathwaite and very close to Cumwhinton, both of which had stations of their own.

The tramway is absent from later maps, though its route is clearly visible as a track on the 1951 map. The station closed in 1952. Unusually for this line, the passenger buildings were demolished. The site remains clear so could in principle be re-used. One end of it is occupied by a communication mast. The stationmaster's house and railway workers' cottages are immediately adjacent to the Cotehill Viaduct, where the railway crosses High Stand Gill near where it flows into the Eden. The houses are privately occupied.

== Stationmasters ==
- G. Latimer 1876 – 1880
- Edwin Belfield 1880 – 1881 (afterwards station master at Long Preston)
- Thomas Moss 1881 – 1885 (formerly station master at Ormside, afterwards station master at Armathwaite)
- G. E. Davies 1885 – 1886
- H. Arms 1886 – ca. 1914
- E.W. Edwards until 1939 (also station master at Armathwaite, afterwards station master at Gwyddelwern, Merioneth)
- Stanley C. Routledge from 1939 (also station master at Armathwaite)
- F. Hulse from 1940
- L. Mortimer from 1941 (also station master at Armathwaite)

Preceding station	Historical railways	Following station
Armathwaite	Midland Railway; Settle-Carlisle Railway	Cumwhinton
