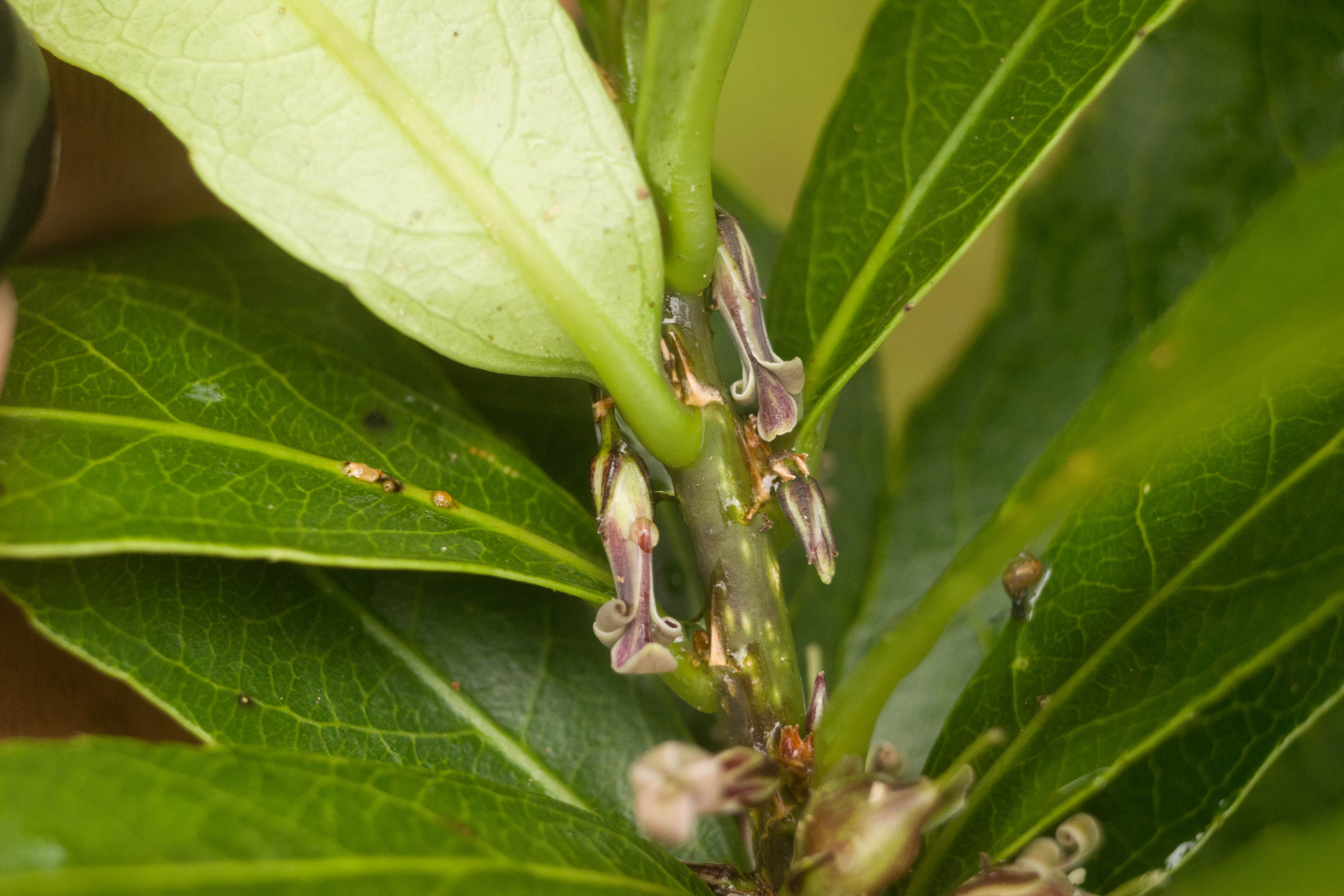

Conservation status
- Critically Imperiled (NatureServe)

Scientific classification
- Kingdom: Plantae
- Clade: Tracheophytes
- Clade: Angiosperms
- Clade: Eudicots
- Clade: Rosids
- Order: Malpighiales
- Family: Violaceae
- Genus: Isodendrion
- Species: I. laurifolium

Binomial name
- Isodendrion laurifolium A.Gray

= Isodendrion laurifolium =

Species of flowering plant

Isodendrion laurifolium is a rare species of flowering plant in the violet family known by the common names rockcliff isodendrion and aupaka. It is endemic to Hawaii, where it is known from fewer than 1000 individuals on the islands of Kauai and Oahu. It is a federally listed endangered species of the United States.

== Description ==
This is a shrub growing 1 to 2 meters tall. It produces purple flowers. It has very few branches. The leathery leaves are from 4-16 centimeters long. The flowers are borne along the stems. The five clawed petals are purple with white edges. The fruit is a green capsule. The flowers are bisexual, meaning that they have both male and female flowers. The stipules are glabrous or ciliate. The bottom flower petals are slightly longer than the others.

== Habitat ==
This shrub only grows in moist and wet forest habitat. As of 2003 there were five occurrences of the plant on Oahu for a total of 22 or 23 individuals in the Waianae and Koolau Mountains. In Kauai there were thirteen occurrences with 142 to 154 plants. Only one population of the plant has more than 50 individuals.

The plants' habitat is threatened by feral ungulates including wild boars. Another threat is competition with non-native plant species.
