= Rockcliffe Cross =

Village in Cumbria, England

Coordinates: 54.955°N 3.025°W

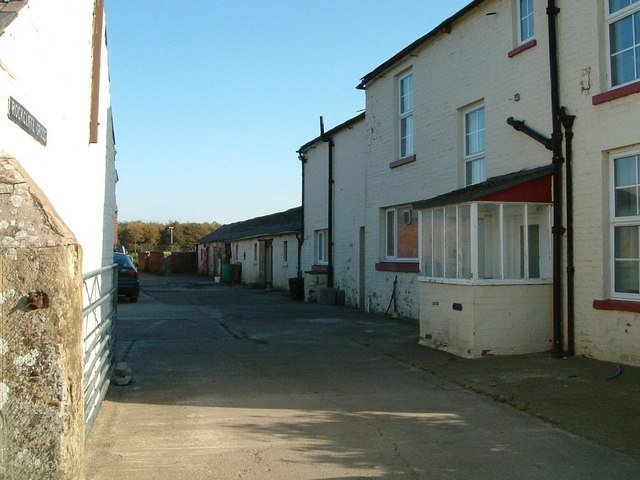
- Farm buildings, Rockcliffe Cross

- Location in the former Carlisle district Location within Cumbria
- OS grid reference: NY343627
- Civil parish: Rockcliffe
- Unitary authority: Cumberland
- Ceremonial county: Cumbria
- Region: North West
- Country: England
- Sovereign state: United Kingdom
- Post town: CARLISLE
- Postcode district: CA6
- Dialling code: 01228
- Police: Cumbria
- Fire: Cumbria
- Ambulance: North West
- UK Parliament: Carlisle

Rockcliffe Cross is a village in the parish of Rockcliffe, in the Cumberland district of the county of Cumbria, England.

== Location ==
It is located on an unclassified road near the village of Rockcliffe and about seven miles away from the city of Carlisle. It is near the River Eden and the River Esk and the England/Scotland border. There is the M6 motorway a few miles away, which was the A74 road until it was upgraded and access to it was restricted.
