= Rockcliffe railway station =

Former railway station in Cumbria, England

Rockcliffe

General information
- Location: Rockcliffe, Cumbria; England
- Coordinates: 54.9410°N 2.9846°W
- Grid reference: NY370611
- Platforms: 2

Other information
- Status: Disused

History
- Original company: Caledonian Railway
- Pre-grouping: Caledonian Railway
- Post-grouping: London Midland and Scottish Railway

Key dates
- 10 September 1847: Station opened
- 1 January 1917: Station closed
- 2 December 1919: Station reopened
- 17 July 1950: Passenger service withdrawn, but workmen's trains continued. Station renamed Rockcliffe Halt
- 6 December 1965: Station closed
Location
- Location within the former City of Carlisle district Location within Cumbria

Rockcliffe railway station, later Rockcliffe Halt, served the rural area around Rockcliffe, north of Carlisle in the English county of Cumberland (now part of Cumbria); it lay some distance from the village. The station was served by local trains on what is now known as the West Coast Main Line. The nearest station for Rockcliffe is now at Carlisle.

== History ==
Opened by the Caledonian Railway, it became part of the London Midland and Scottish Railway during the Grouping of 1923 and BR in 1948. It closed briefly during WW1 and was renamed as Rockcliffe Halt in 1950 when regular passenger service ceased after which it was only used by railway workers at the nearby marshalling yards until 1965.

The station had a stationmaster's house, with combined ticket office and a waiting room. The line is still double track here.

Preceding station	Historical railways	Following station
Carlisle; Line and station open	Caledonian Railway; Main Line	Floriston; Line open; Station closed

== The site today ==
Trains pass through the site at speed on the electrified West Coast Main Line. The station platforms have been demolished and the pedestrian overbridge has been removed; however, the stationmaster's house remains as a private dwelling.
