= Rockcliffe, Cumbria =

Village and civil parish in England

Coordinates: 54.9456°N 3.0027°W

Rockcliffe
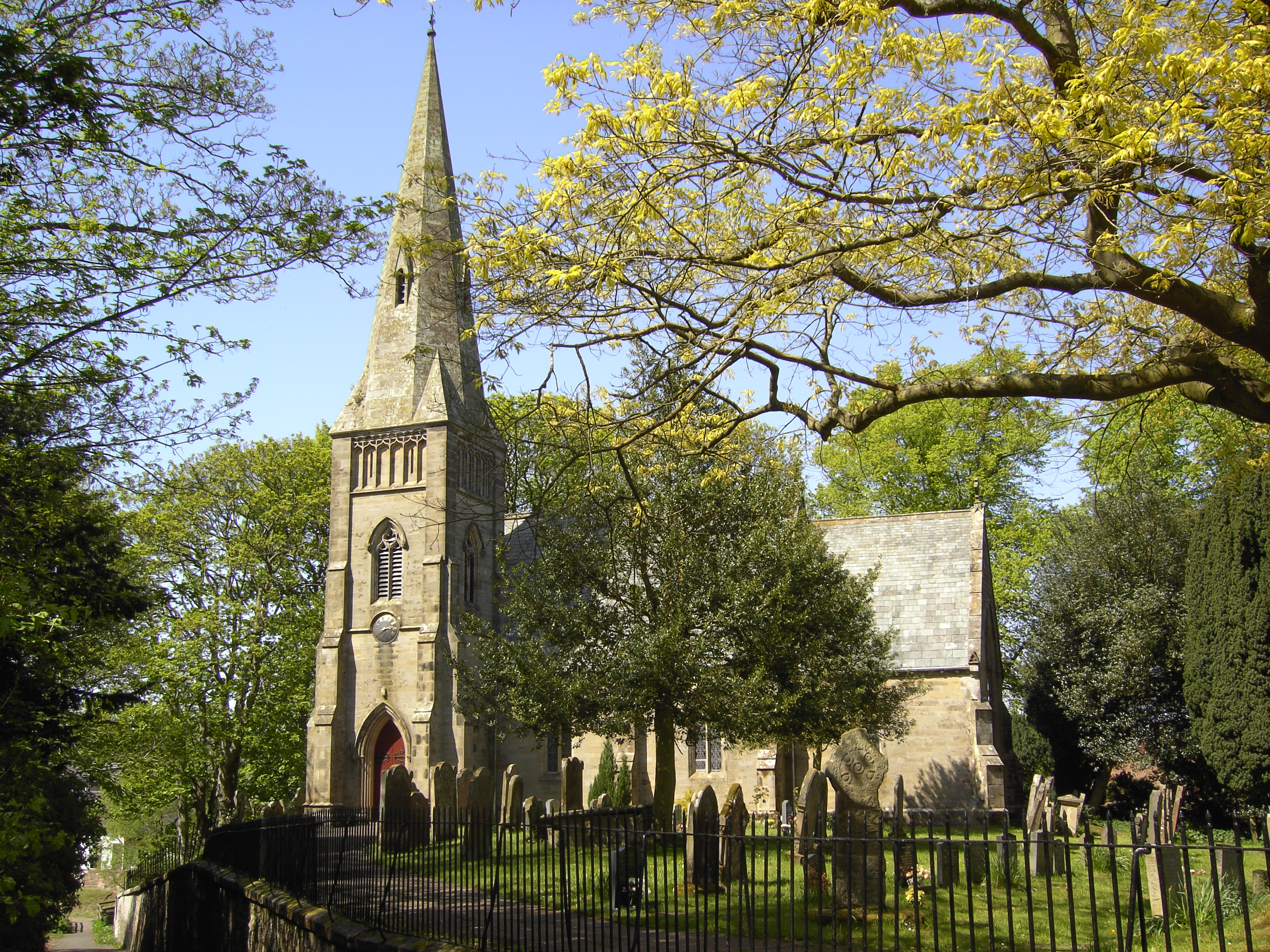
- St. Mary's Church, Rockcliffe

- Location within Cumbria
- Population: 801 (2021)
- OS grid reference: NY3709160293
- Civil parish: Rockcliffe
- Unitary authority: Cumberland
- Ceremonial county: Cumbria
- Region: North West
- Country: England
- Sovereign state: United Kingdom
- Post town: CARLISLE
- Postcode district: CA6
- Dialling code: 01228
- Police: Cumbria
- Fire: Cumbria
- Ambulance: North West
- UK Parliament: Carlisle

Rockcliffe is a village and civil parish in the Cumberland district of Cumbria, England. Part of the parish is a marshy peninsula between the mouths of the rivers Esk and Eden. The parish includes the settlements of Rockcliffe, Rockcliffe Cross, Floristonrigg, Todhills, Low Harker and Harker. In 2021, the parish had a population of 801.

Rockcliffe formerly had a railway station, on the Caledonian Railway Main Line, that closed in 1965. Another station was located nearby at Floriston that closed in 1950.

== Toponymy ==
Rockcliffe does not mean 'cliff by rocks' or 'rocky cliff' as many might think. The name means 'red cliff', implying a sandstone cliff-face. The name is from Old Norse rauðr meaning "red" and Old English clif for "cliff", similar to Radcliffe in Greater Manchester.

== Governance ==
Rockcliffe is the largest parish in the electoral ward of Longtown & Rockcliffe. The ward covers the two parishes and the area in between. The total ward population at the 2011 Census was 4,123.

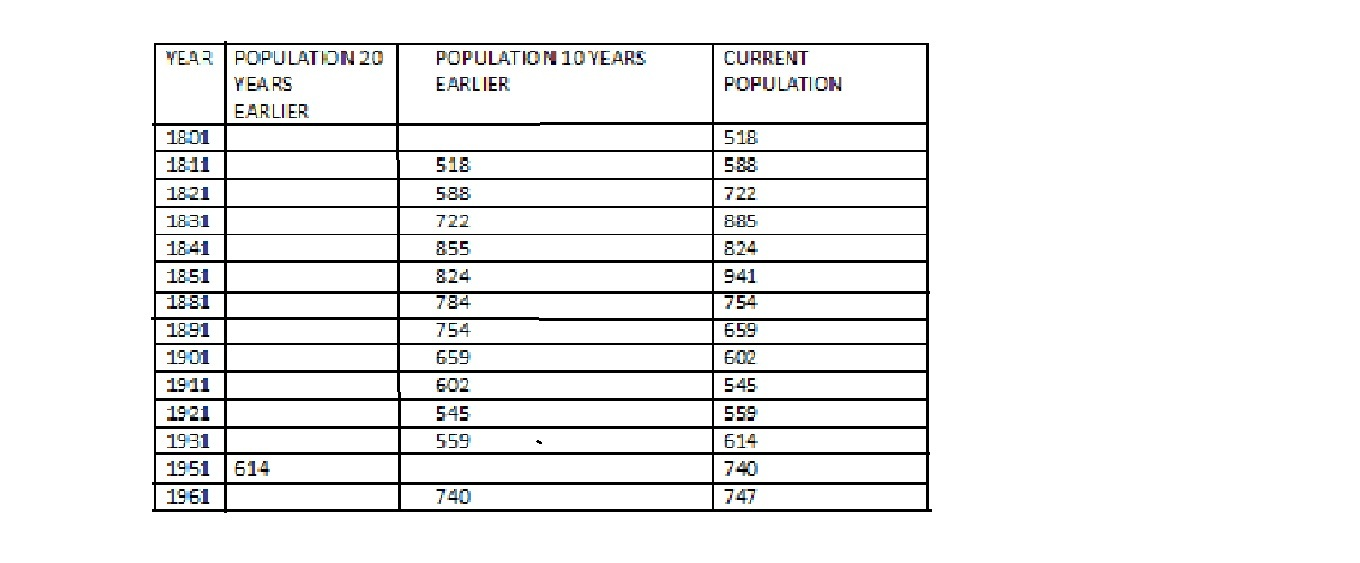
Population of Rockcliffe Parish through time

== See also ==
- Listed buildings in Rockcliffe, Cumbria
