= Scotby =

Coordinates: 54.888°N 2.873°W

- Village
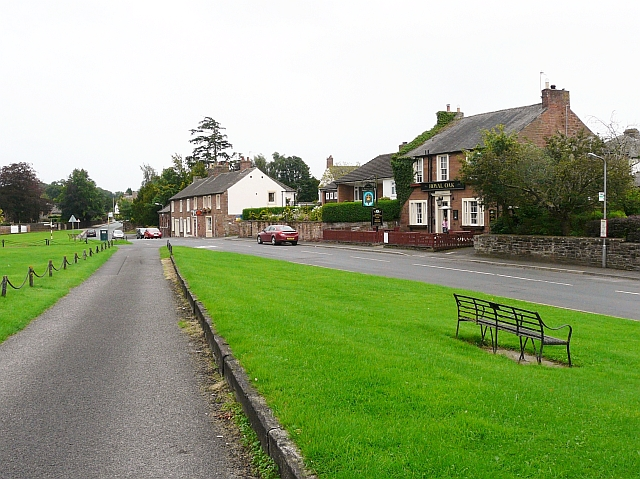
- Village green, Scotby

- Location within Cumbria
- Area: 0.818 km^{2} (0.316 sq mi)
- Population: 2,366 (2018 estimate)
  - Density: 2,892/km^{2} (7,490/sq mi)
- OS grid reference: NY440551
- Civil parish: Wetheral
- Unitary authority: Cumberland
- Ceremonial county: Cumbria
- Region: North West
- Country: England
- Sovereign state: United Kingdom
- Post town: CARLISLE
- Postcode district: CA4
- Dialling code: 01228
- Police: Cumbria
- Fire: Cumbria
- Ambulance: North West
- UK Parliament: Carlisle

Scotby is a village in the Cumberland unitary authority area of Cumbria, England. It is separated from Carlisle by the M6 motorway, and it is close to other dormitory villages in the area, such as Wetheral, Cumwhinton and Aglionby. It is part of the Wetheral civil parish. In 2018 it had an estimated population of 2366.

== History ==
During the Second World War, on 11 March 1943, a village dance was being held in the village hall when a bomb penetrated the hall roof which resulted in a local farmer being killed.

In the field on the opposite side of the Tyne Valley Line to the Church, rubber tubes were laid out so as to represent railway lines to make the German Luftwaffe think that it was a major railway sidings of Carlisle. It is thought that the Luftwaffe, which was returning from a bombing raid on the munitions factory at Gretna, released their bomb load on to the fake sidings in the hope of destroying them, and also to lighten their plane load for their flight home. On the same night, a bomb also landed near to the War Memorial in the churchyard. Although it did not explode, damage was done to some of the church windows.

== Community ==
Scotby School is the main primary school for children living in the area. It has around 282 registered pupils, and its catchment includes Wetheral village and parts of eastern Carlisle. There is also a Preschool for younger children

There is a village green in the centre of the village, and the village hall is located beside it. The hall, which is arranged as a single floor, was constructed in 1926, and an extension was added to the front of the building in 1953.

Also on this side of the green is a building which used to be the Quaker Meeting house. It is now part of a small development called Scotby Green Steading. The Quakers had a strong religious presence in the village going back to at least the mid 1600s. The Meeting House was used by them until as late the Second World War. Along with the cemetery adjacent to the Meeting House, the Quakers also had a burial ground situated off Broomfallen Road on what is known as White Hill. This can be seen from Ladysteps; it is the small wood to the right of the skyline.

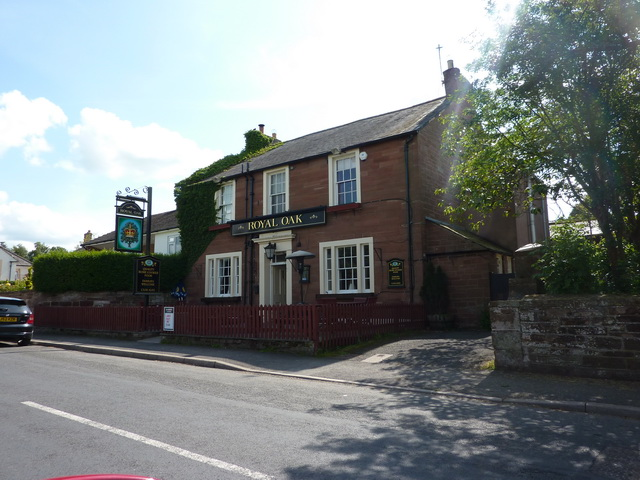
The Royal Oak public house

Opposite the green is the village Shop and Post Office, a public house and Scotby Parish Centre. The Parish Centre was originally built as a Reading Room by the Quakers in the 1880s.

The village Church is the All Saints Church, which is located on a piece of high ground situated between the village green and the Tyne Valley Line railway. The church was consecrated on 11 October 1855. Before this date, residents of the village had to travel to the Holy Trinity church in Wetheral to worship, and to be buried in Wetheral Churchyard cemetery. To reach the cemetery, a number of Corpse Roads were used and many of these lonnings exist today, for example, the lonning at the top of Ghyll Road in Scotby.

=== Sport ===
The village has its own cricket club, Scotby Cricket Club. The town also has a football team called Scotby FC and they play in the Carlisle Sunday league division.

== Transport ==
There was formerly a railway station on the Tyne Valley Line, however the station was closed in 1959, before the Beeching Axe. The Settle-Carlisle Railway also runs through the village and Scotby also had a station on this line until 1942.

== Notable residents ==
- Lisa McGrillis (1982-), actress, grew up in Scotby.

== See also ==
- Listed buildings in Wetheral
