= Scotby railway station =

Railway station in Cumbria, England

Scotby railway station was a station on the Newcastle and Carlisle Railway, situated in the village of Scotby, two miles outside of Carlisle, England.

== History ==
This railway station (54.8891°N 2.8778°W) was originally built to help accommodate the two tanneries located in the village. The station was closed in 1959, due to financial problems, some four years before the Beeching Axe.

Preceding station	Historical railways	Following station
Wetheral	North Eastern Railway; Newcastle and Carlisle Railway	Carlisle
