= Carlisle railway station =

Railway station in Cumbria, England

Carlisle Carlisle Citadel
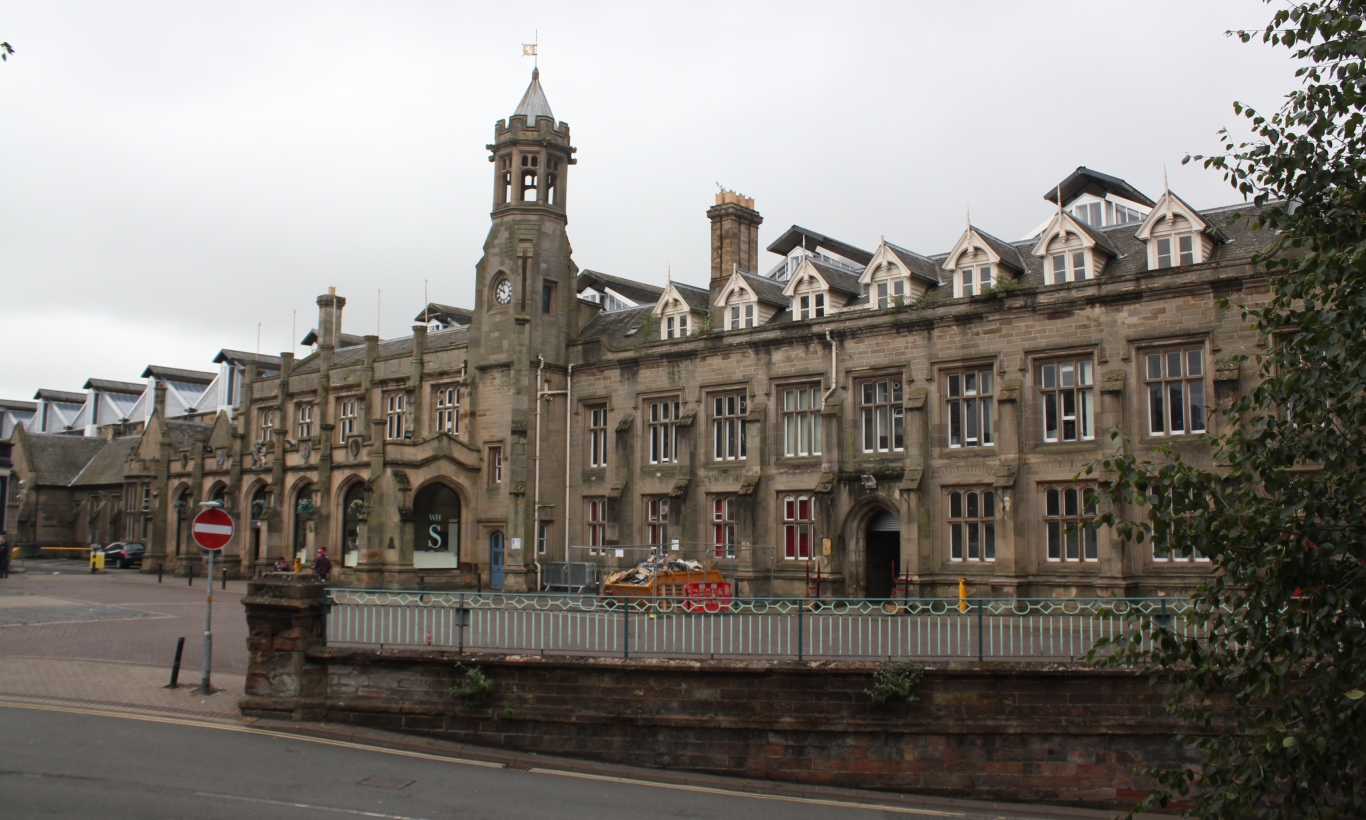
- The main facade of Carlisle station in July 2018

General information
- Location: Carlisle, Cumberland, England
- Coordinates: 54.891°N 2.934°W
- Grid reference: NY401555
- Owner: Network Rail
- Manager: Avanti West Coast
- Platforms: 8

Other information
- Station code: CAR
- Classification: DfT category B

History
- Original company: Caledonian Railway/Lancaster and Carlisle Railway joint
- Pre-grouping: Caledonian Railway/London and North Western Railway joint
- Post-grouping: London, Midland and Scottish Railway

Key dates
- 1 September 1847: Opened as Carlisle Citadel
- 1875: Extended
- (after 1948): Renamed Carlisle

Passengers
- 2021/22: ▲1.779 million
- Interchange: ▲0.241 million
- 2022/23: ▲1.801 million
- Interchange: ▲0.302 million
- 2023/24: ▲2.103 million
- Interchange: ▲0.347 million
- 2024/25: ▲2.316 million
- Interchange: ▲0.368 million
- 2025/26: ▲2.537 million
- Interchange: ▲0.407 million

Listed Building – Grade II*
- Feature: Citadel Station
- Designated: 13 November 1972
- Reference no.: 1196969
Location
Notes
- Passenger statistics from the Office of Rail and Road

Carlisle, or Carlisle Citadel, is a Grade II* listed railway station serving the cathedral city of Carlisle, in Cumbria, England. It is a principal stop on the West Coast Main Line, 102 miles (164 km) south-east of Glasgow Central and 299 miles (481 km) north-north-west of London Euston. It is the northern terminus of the Settle and Carlisle Line. The station is so named because it is adjacent to Carlisle Citadel, a former medieval fortress (not to be confused with Carlisle Castle). The station is owned by Network Rail.

In September 1847, the first services departed the station, even though construction was not completed until the following year. It was built in a neo-Tudor style to the designs of English architect William Tite. Carlisle station was one of a number in the city; the others were Crown Street and London Road, but it became the dominant station by 1851. The other stations had their passenger services redirected to it and were closed. Between 1875 and 1876, the station was expanded to accommodate the lines of the Midland Railway which was the seventh railway company to use it.

The Beeching cuts of the 1960s affected Carlisle, particularly the closure of the former North British Railway lines to Silloth, on 7 September 1964, and the Waverley Line to Edinburgh Waverley via Galashiels on 6 January 1969. The closure programme claimed neighbouring lines, including the Castle Douglas and Dumfries Railway and Portpatrick Railway (the "Port Road") in 1965; this resulted in a significant mileage increase via the Glasgow South Western Line and Ayr to reach Stranraer Harbour and ferries to Northern Ireland. The station layout has undergone few changes other than the singling of the ex-NER Tyne Valley route to London Road Junction in the 1972–73 resignalling scheme, which was associated with the electrification of the West Coast Main Line (WCML). Renovations to the platforms and glass roof were performed between 2015 and 2018.

== History ==
=== Construction and early operations ===
Close to the English border with Scotland, Carlisle became an important railway interchange in the first half of the 19th century. In 1836, Carlisle's first station opened at London Road for the Newcastle and Carlisle Railway; seven years later, Crown Street opened for the Maryport & Carlisle Railway. In the mid-1840s, work commenced on Carlisle Citadel on the south side of Court Square. Citadel station was built for the Lancaster & Carlisle Railway and the Caledonian Railways.

Carlisle station was designed by the architect William Tite. His design incorporated Tudor and Gothic styles. Built at a cost of £53,000, the station was constructed between 1846 and 1848. On 10 September 1847, it was officially opened to rail traffic, even though construction was incomplete and only one long through platform with a bay at each end had been finished.

The main station buildings have a multi-bay sandstone facade of two storeys, capped by rows of slate roofs at differing levels. The entrance portico is supported by five pointed arches with buttresses between. Roundels are placed over three arches; the central roundel bears the royal arms of Queen Victoria, flanked by those of the Lancaster & Carlisle and the Caledonian Railways but the outer plaques, intended for the Maryport & Carlisle and the Newcastle and Carlisle who did not contribute towards the cost of the station's construction, are blank.

Carlisle Citadel Station Act 1861
- Act of Parliament
- Parliament of the United Kingdom
- Long title: An Act for the Enlargement, Regulation and Management of "The Citadel Station" at Carlisle, situate at the Junction of the Lancaster and Carlisle and the Caledonian Railways, and for other Purposes.
- Citation: 24 & 25 Vict. c. clxvi

Dates
- Royal assent: 22 July 1861

As a consequence of the station accommodating the complex timetables operated by two (and eventually seven) operating companies, a joint management committee was established. On 10 May 1857, the Carlisle Citadel Station Agreement was drawn up and established under the Carlisle Citadel Station Act 1861 (24 & 25 Vict. c. clxvi) of 22 July 1861. The committee had eight directors: four each from the boards of the Caledonian and the London and North Western Railway (L&NWR), which had absorbed the Lancaster & Carlisle in 1859.

Carlisle Citadel Station Act 1873
- Act of Parliament
- Parliament of the United Kingdom
- Long title: An Act for enlarging the extent and improving the accommodation of the Citadel station at Carlisle, and making and maintaining new Connecting Lines between the various Railways converging there; and for other purposes.
- Citation: 36 & 37 Vict. c. clxxxvii

Dates
- Royal assent: 21 July 1873

Text of statute as originally enacted

To improve freight services the Carlisle Goods Traffic Committee was formed after the Carlisle Citadel Station Act 1873 (36 & 37 Vict. c. clxxxvii). The London & North Western, Midland, Caledonian and Glasgow & South Western each had two directors on the committee. To minimise the danger to passengers, a goods avoidance line was constructed to divert freight trains around the station.

=== Expansion and later service ===
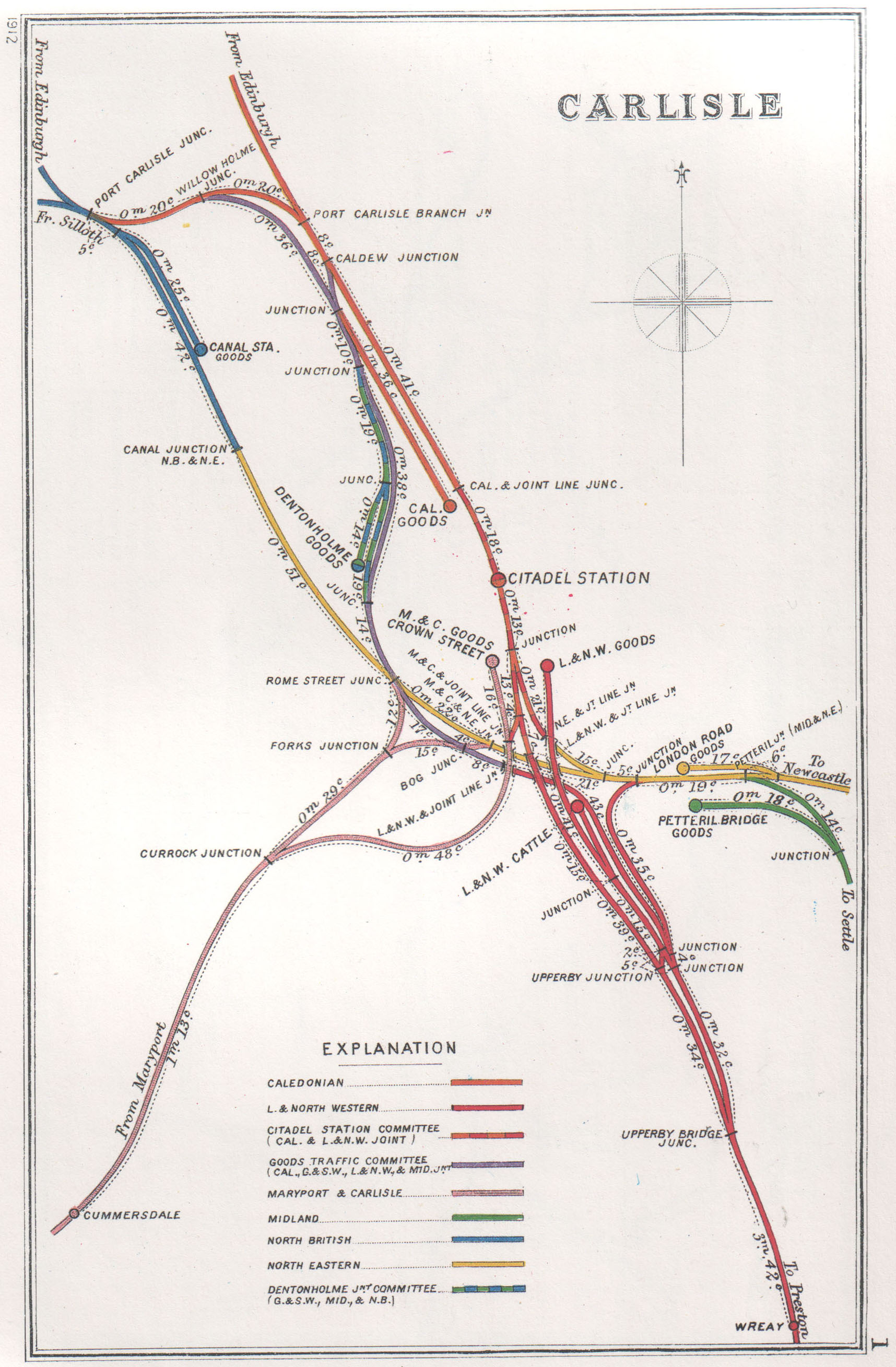
A 1912 Railway Clearing House junction diagram, showing railways in the vicinity of Carlisle (shown here as Citadel station)

The Carlisle Citadel Station Act 1873 (36 & 37 Vict. c. clxxxvii) authorised changes, not restricted to freight, including an instruction "enlarging and improving facilities". Expansion work took place between 1873 and 1876 followed by a second phase between 1878 and 1881. While construction was taking place, the opening of the Midland Railway's Settle–Carlisle line generated more freight trains from August 1875 and passenger services started in April 1876.

On 20 July 1881, improvements were officially completed. Carlisle station was used by seven railway companies: the London and North Western, North Eastern, Midland, Caledonian, North British, Glasgow & South Western, and Maryport & Carlisle. Each company operated its own passenger amenities, with separate booking and parcels offices.

Additional tracks, buildings and platforms were constructed including an island platform with two-storey buildings which increased the 400 metre-long through platforms to three. Five terminal bay platforms were constructed and an overarching footbridge which connected the through platforms inside the train shed. Below the platforms, the undercroft contains a network of passageways, offices, service rooms and staff accommodation; parts of the underground areas are reputed to be haunted.

During the construction programme, an iron and glass large roof was installed behind the station buildings. As built, it spanned 85 metres across the platforms and tracks to cover an area in excess of 2.6 hectares. It consisted of 26 deep lattice girders, with a transverse span and 12.2 metre centres; each girder had 10 panels, stiffened end posts and a flat bottom tie. The girders supported a series of slender balanced cantilever half-truss hooped beams at approximately 3.7m centres, spanning the tracks. The ornate timber end screens had Gothic-style glazing bars. The roof was glazed using shingled panels, possibly making use of Rendel's patented Indestructible System, and was designed by Edinburgh-based engineering firm Blyth & Cunningham.

=== Twentieth century ===
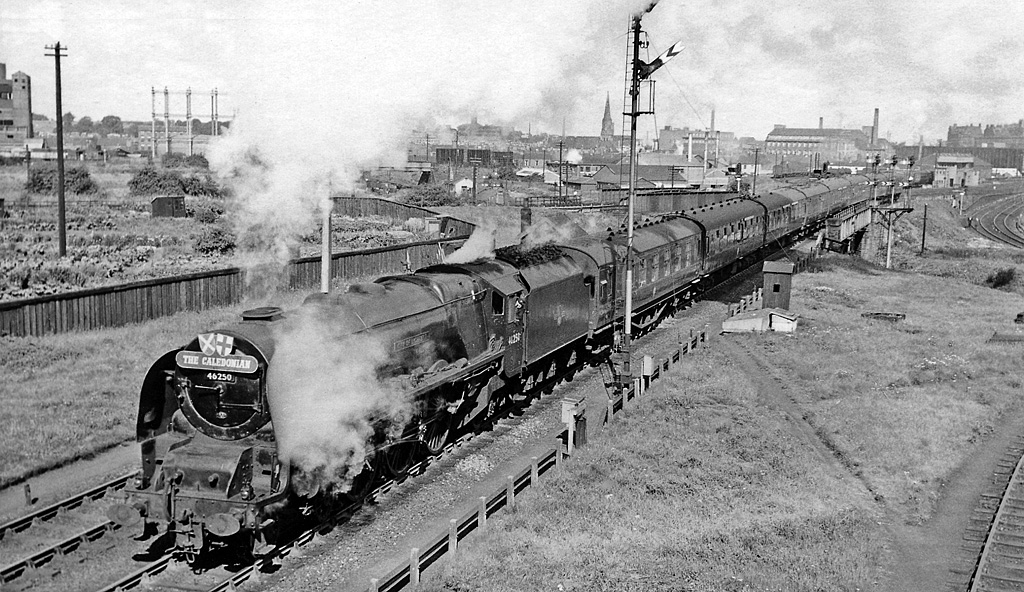
The up Caledonian leaving Carlisle in August 1960

During 1922, five of the seven companies that operated at the station were absorbed into the London Midland & Scottish Railway (LMS) after the Railways Act 1921. During the Second World War, black paint was applied to the roof glazing as a precautionary measure against enemy air raids.

Preventative maintenance gradually led to large areas of the glass roof becoming unsafe and forcing occasional platform closures after falling glass. In 1957, it was decided to reduce the area of the roof and concentrate maintenance activities on the remaining area. Between 1957 and 1958, the south-western half of the station roof, and portions of its north-eastern half and the end screens were removed. The original glass panes were replaced by large patent glazing panels. The substantial supporting wall at the south-western side of the station was left in place. The wall is built of sandstone and linked to the main buildings by a series of arched tunnels in the undercroft.

In November 1972, the station received Grade II* listed status; its citation notes: "The building by Tite is among the most important early major railway stations in Britain." In April 1994, the freestanding retaining wall was also listed separately as Grade II.

=== Restorations ===
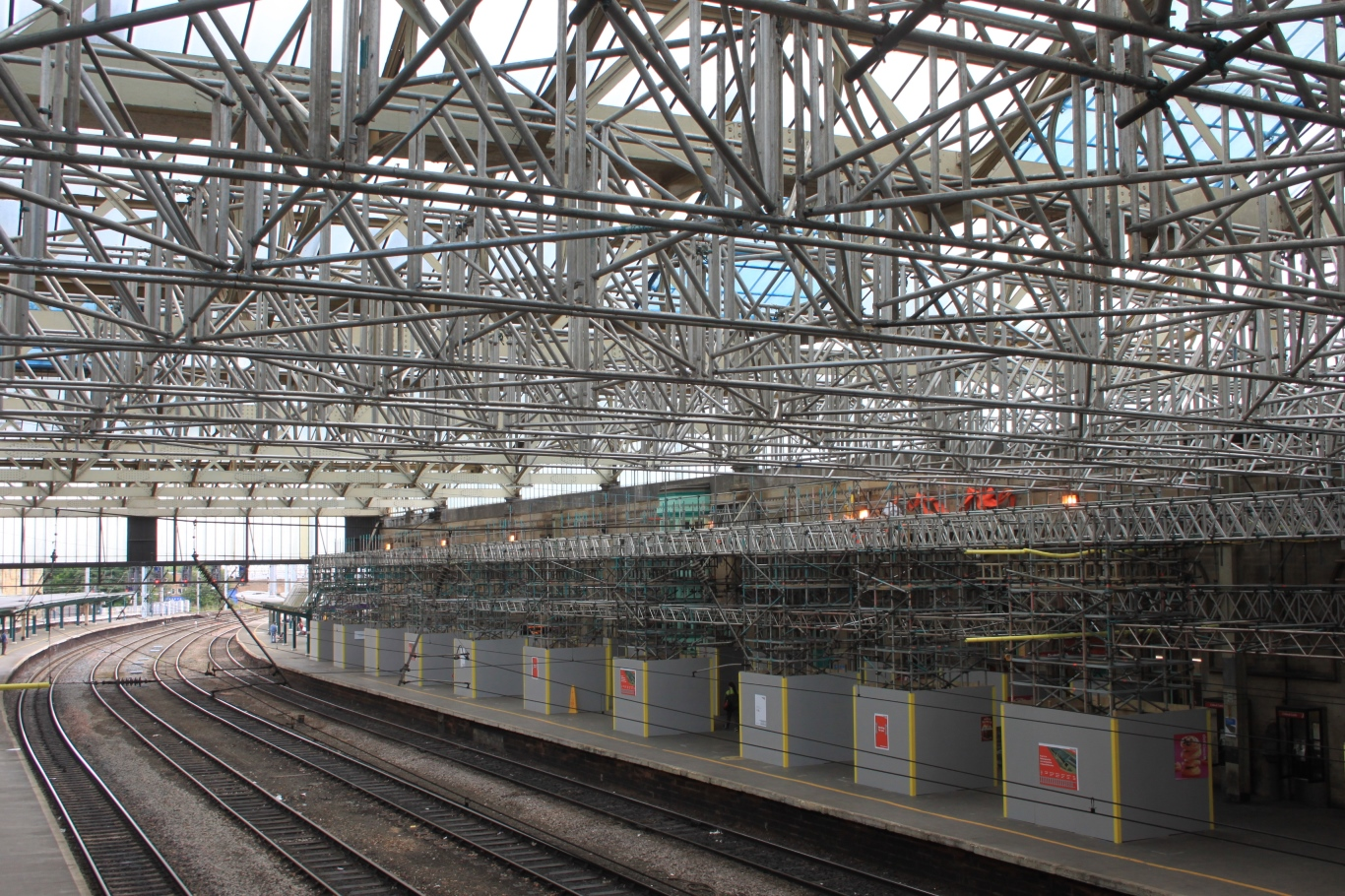
Refurbishment of the train shed roof in July 2016

Between October 2010 and March 2011, a series of improvements were performed at Carlisle station; these were focused on its passenger amenities, such as the waiting, meeting and seating areas. From 13 July 2013 to 7 April 2014, as part of a £1.5 million refurbishment project, accessibility at the station was improved via the refurbishment of the lifts and other alterations to achieve step-free access to all of the platforms. In conjunction, a formerly-disused subway was also renovated.

According to rail industry publication Rail Engineer, it was clear by 2014 that the station's roof was in need of restoration. The steel trusses were found to have been sagging in places, which was speculated to have been a result not only of the structure's age but also come as a consequence of the alterations performed during the 1950s it had been exacerbated by the adoption of rigid glazing and insufficient drainage systems. Multiple panels have cracked or broken, resulting in the deployment of several nets to catch falling glass, while rainwater often pooled in areas of the roof rather than draining away. Furthermore, maintenance activities were complicated by a lack of access to the roof on the part of safety restrictions, preventing even routine cleaning, thus the panels were perpetually dirty and provided poor natural lighting conditions throughout the platforms.

During November 2015, work commenced upon the repair and refurbishment of the station's roof, as well as the rebuilding of all eight platforms under a £14.7 million scheme that was managed and carried out by national rail infrastructure management company Network Rail. This programme was planned by global design consulting firm Arcadis, in close cooperation with both Historic England and Carlisle City Council. The renovated roof was designed to incorporate modern elements and contemporary construction techniques; significant attention was reportedly paid to maintaining its historical aesthetic. The new roof is primarily composed of ethylene tetrafluoroethylene (EFTE) sheeting and aluminium frames, which is claimed to possess a high level of resistance to corrosion as well as retaining considerable strength and being far lighter than conventional glass panes. Other benefits include the roof being shatterproof and self-cleaning. Construction company Galliford Try served as the principal contractor performing the roof replacement, while Vector Foiltec manufactured and fitted the EFTE sheets. It was also decided to repaint the metalwork of the roof, which was not originally included in the programme's scope.

During February 2018, a second phase of this renovation programme, which was focused upon the platforms themselves, was scheduled to commence. Work to resurface and install tactile paving on platforms 1, 2, and 3 was completed in March 2022.

=== Accidents and incidents ===
- On 4 March 1890, a night express from London was unable to stop on approaching the station, overran signals and collided with a light engine, killing 4 people. The driver claimed that the automatic vacuum brake had failed due to icing in the train pipe between engine and train. The Inspecting Officer disputed this and concluded that the driver had accidentally switched to the simple vacuum brake and released the brakes. This verdict caused some controversy at the time and in subsequent years.
- On 6 June 1961, a light engine and a freight train collided under the Caldewgate road bridge.
- On 1 May 1984, a runaway freight train collided with and destroyed the River Caldew bridge at Denton Holme. This incident directly contributed to the decision to permanently close the goods line shortly thereafter. However, the goods line was not dismantled; it has been speculated that it could be restored and reopened to traffic one day, if the measure was to be deemed necessary for the relief of freight congestion in the vicinity of the station.
- On 19 October 2022, a freight train carrying cement derailed while crossing the bridge over the River Petteril east of the station, causing significant damage to the infrastructure. At least one of the five derailed wagons ended up in the river.

== Facilities ==
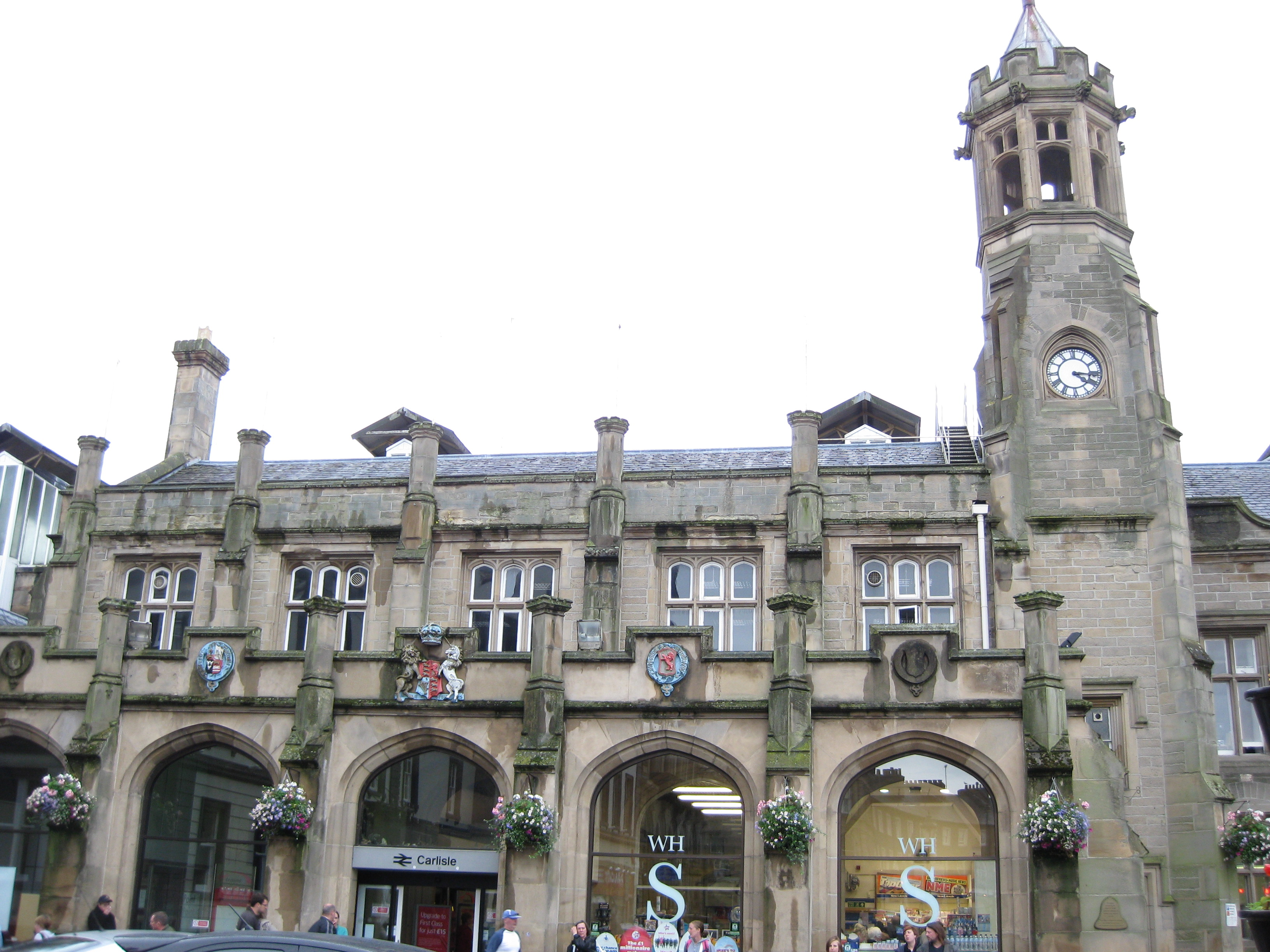
The station frontage, photo taken in August 2009

The station is a fully staffed facility during normal hours; the booking office is typically open each day from the start of services in the morning up until 20:00 in the evening. A number of ticket machines are also available in the booking hall. To the north of the station's portico, located directly between the main entrance and the station offices, is a square clock tower, furnished with an octagonal lantern; to the south of the portico are single-storey waiting and refreshment rooms. Interior details of these rooms included Tudor and Gothic-style fireplaces and linen-fold wood-panelled doors.

Multiple waiting rooms are located on both of the station's main platforms; additionally, there is a newsagent on the concourse and a buffet on platform three. Train running information is provided across the station in the form of auditory announcements over a public address system, along with a series of distributed digital display screens. In line with accessibility legislation, full step-free access is possible to all platforms on the station via ramps to the footbridge or lifts and subway.

== Layout ==
There are eight platforms at the station in total: three through and five bays, organised as follows (from west to east):

1. Relief West Coast Main Line platform (bi-directional) and occasional Caledonian Sleeper; this is the normal northbound West Coast Main Line platform
2. Cumbrian Coast Line bay
3. West Coast Main Line northbound platform (bi-directional), mostly TransPennine Express northbound
4. West Coast Main Line southbound platform (bi-directional)
5. Tyne Valley Line bay/Settle and Carlisle line bay
6. As platform 5; services at these platforms often alternate
7. Scottish services to various destinations between Carlisle and Glasgow, via the Glasgow South Western Line
8. Used instead of Platform 7 occasionally for ScotRail services to Glasgow

There are stabling roads between platforms 3 and 4 in the train shed, and a loop around platform 1. There are several electrified sidings to the west of platform 1. There are substantial buildings on both the western island and the main up platform on the east side, with the main station buffet on the former and the travel centre/ticket office and shop on the latter. Both main platforms have waiting rooms and toilets; they are linked by a fully accessible footbridge.

Freight trains formerly used a goods line to the west to bypass the station, but this was closed in 1984 after a runaway rake of container wagons derailed at high speed on the River Caldew bridge at Denton Holme, damaging it beyond economic repair. Nearly all freight services (apart from those running directly from the Cumbrian Coast Line toward the Tyne Valley Line or the Settle–Carlisle Line, or vice versa) now have to use one of the main platform lines when passing through the station, which can cause congestion at peak times.

== Services ==
The station is served by six train operating companies, with the following general off-peak service pattern in trains per hour (tph) / day (tpd):

=== Avanti West Coast ===
- 1 tph to London Euston, via the Trent Valley line
- 1 tph to London Euston, via Birmingham New Street
- 1 tph to Glasgow Central, which have taken the Trent Valley line route
- 1 tp2h to Edinburgh Waverley
- 1 tp2h to Glasgow Central, which have taken the route via Birmingham New Street.

=== Northern Trains ===
- 1 tph to Barrow-in-Furness, via Whitehaven
- 1 tph to Middlesbrough, via Hexham and Newcastle
- 1 tph to Newcastle, via Hexham
- 1 tp2h to Leeds, via Settle.

=== ScotRail ===
- 1 tp2h to Dumfries
- 1 tp2h to Glasgow Central, via Kilmarnock.

=== TransPennine Express ===
- 1 tph to Manchester Airport
- 3 tpd to Liverpool Lime Street
- 1 tp2h to Edinburgh Waverley
- 1 tp2h to Glasgow Central (from Manchester Airport)
- 3 tpd to Glasgow Central (from Liverpool Lime Street).

=== Caledonian Sleeper ===
- 1 tpd to London Euston
- 1 tpd to Glasgow Central

=== Lumo ===
- 4 tpd to London Euston
- 4 tpd to Stirling

Preceding station	National Rail	Following station
Terminus	ScotRail Glasgow South Western Line	Gretna Green
Penrith North Lakes	Avanti West Coast West Coast Main Line; London Euston – Glasgow Central or Edinburgh Waverley	Lockerbie
Penrith North Lakes	Avanti West Coast West Coast Main Line; London Euston – Glasgow Central or Edinburgh Waverley	Motherwell
Oxenholme Lake District	Avanti West Coast West Coast Main Line; London Euston – Glasgow Central or Edinburgh Waverley	Glasgow Central
Oxenholme Lake District	Avanti West Coast West Coast Main Line; London Euston – Glasgow Central or Edinburgh Waverley	Haymarket
Watford Junction	Caledonian Sleeper Lowland Caledonian Sleeper	Carstairs
Wetheral	Northern Trains Tyne Valley Line	Terminus
Armathwaite	Northern Trains Settle-Carlisle Line	Terminus
Terminus	Northern Trains Cumbrian Coast Line	Dalston (Cumbria)
Penrith North Lakes	TransPennine Express TransPennine North West; Manchester Airport – Glasgow Central or Edinburgh Waverley	Lockerbie
Oxenholme Lake District	TransPennine Express TransPennine North West; Manchester Airport – Glasgow Central or Edinburgh Waverley	Motherwell
Lancaster	TransPennine Express TransPennine North West; Manchester Airport – Glasgow Central or Edinburgh Waverley	Glasgow Central
Preston	TransPennine Express TransPennine North West; Manchester Airport – Glasgow Central or Edinburgh Waverley	Haymarket
Penrith North Lakes	TransPennine Express Liverpool Lime Street - Glasgow Central	Lockerbie
Oxenholme Lake District	TransPennine Express Liverpool Lime Street - Glasgow Central	Glasgow Central
Terminus	Northern Trains; Carlisle – Middlesbrough	Hexham
Preston	Lumo; London Euston to Stirling	Lockerbie
	Historical railways	
Terminus	Caledonian Railway; CR Main Line	Rockcliffe
Terminus	North British Railway; Border Union Railway	Harker
Terminus	North British Railway; Carlisle and Port Carlisle Railway and Dock Company	Kirkandrews
Terminus	Maryport and Carlisle Railway	Cummersdale; Line open, station closed
Brisco	London and North Western Railway; Lancaster and Carlisle Railway	Terminus
Scotby	Midland Railway; Settle and Carlisle Line	Terminus
Scotby	North Eastern Railway; Newcastle and Carlisle Railway	Terminus

== See also ==
- Grade II* listed buildings in Cumberland
- Listed buildings in Carlisle, Cumbria
