= Gretna =

Gretna may refer to:

== Places ==
=== Australia ===
- Gretna, Tasmania

=== Canada ===
- Gretna, Manitoba

=== Scotland ===
- Gretna, Dumfries and Galloway
- Gretna Green, Dumfries and Galloway

=== United States ===
- Gretna, Florida
- Gretna, Kansas
- Gretna, Louisiana
- Gretna, Nebraska
- Gretna, Ohio
- Mount Gretna, Pennsylvania
  - Mount Gretna Narrow Gauge Railway
- Mount Gretna Heights, Pennsylvania
- Gretna, Virginia

== Transportation ==
- Gretna Green railway station, a railway station in Gretna Green, Dumfries and Galloway, Scotland
- Gretna railway station (Border Union Railway), a former station
- Gretna railway station (Caledonian Railway), a former station

== Other uses ==
- Gretna F.C., a now defunct Scottish football club
- Gretna F.C. 2008, a Scottish football club founded by the fans of the above
- Gretna (skipper), a genus of butterflies in the grass skipper family
- Gretna Campbell, American painter
