= Kirkpatrick railway station =

Former railway station in Scotland

Kirkpatrick
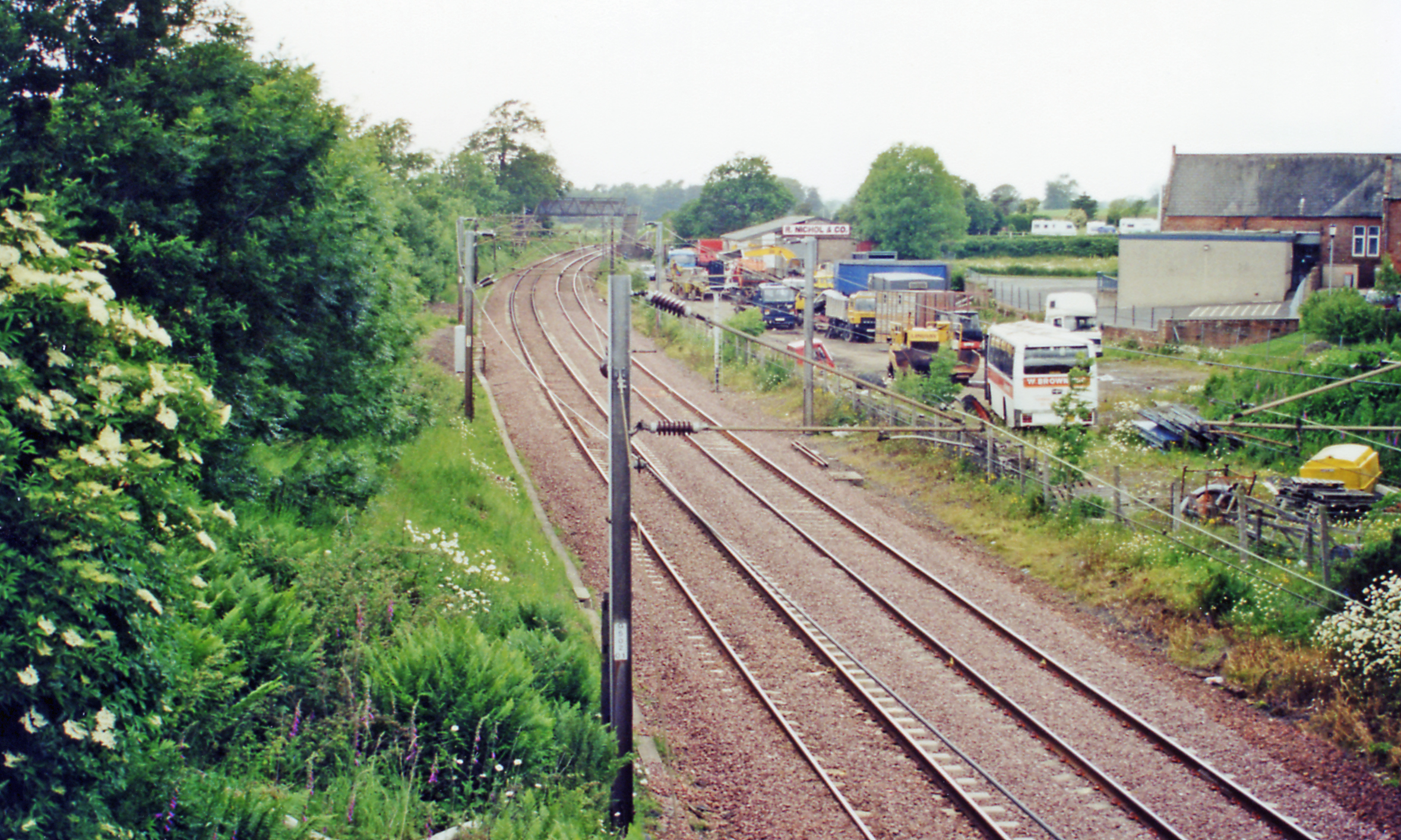

General information
- Location: Kirkpatrick Fleming, Dumfries and Galloway; Scotland
- Coordinates: 55.0231°N 3.1358°W
- Grid reference: NY2748170431
- Platforms: 2

Other information
- Status: Disused

History
- Original company: Caledonian Railway
- Pre-grouping: Caledonian Railway
- Post-grouping: London Midland and Scottish Railway

Key dates
- 10 September 1847: Station opened
- 13 June 1960: Station closed
Location

Kirkpatrick railway station was a station which served the rural area around Kirkpatrick Fleming, north of Gretna in the Scottish county of Dumfries and Galloway. It was served by local trains on what is now known as the West Coast Main Line. The nearest station for Kirkpatrick Fleming is now at Gretna Green.

== History ==
Opened by the Caledonian Railway, it became part of the London Midland and Scottish Railway during the Grouping of 1923 and was then closed by British Railways in 1960.

The station had a number of sidings, a signal box on the western side controlling the level crossing, a pedestrian overbridge, weighing machine, and goods yard.

== Accident ==
A rail crash that took place near Kirkpatrick at the Quintinshill Loops on 22 May 1915. Quintinshill was an intermediate signal box with loops on each side on the Caledonian Railway Main Line. The crash involved five trains, killed a probable 230[nb 1] and injured 246 and remains the worst rail crash in the United Kingdom in terms of loss of life. The cause of the accident was poor working practices on the part of the two signalmen involved which resulted in their imprisonment for culpable homicide.

Preceding station	Historical railways	Following station
Gretna; Line open; Station closed	Caledonian Railway; Main Line	Kirtlebridge; Line open; Station closed

== The site today ==
Trains pass at speed on the electrified West Coast Main Line. The station platforms have been demolished, the pedestrian overbridge is still present and the main station buildings survive as private dwellings. The Station Inn still stands nearby.
