= Bowness railway station =

Disused railway station in Cumbria, England

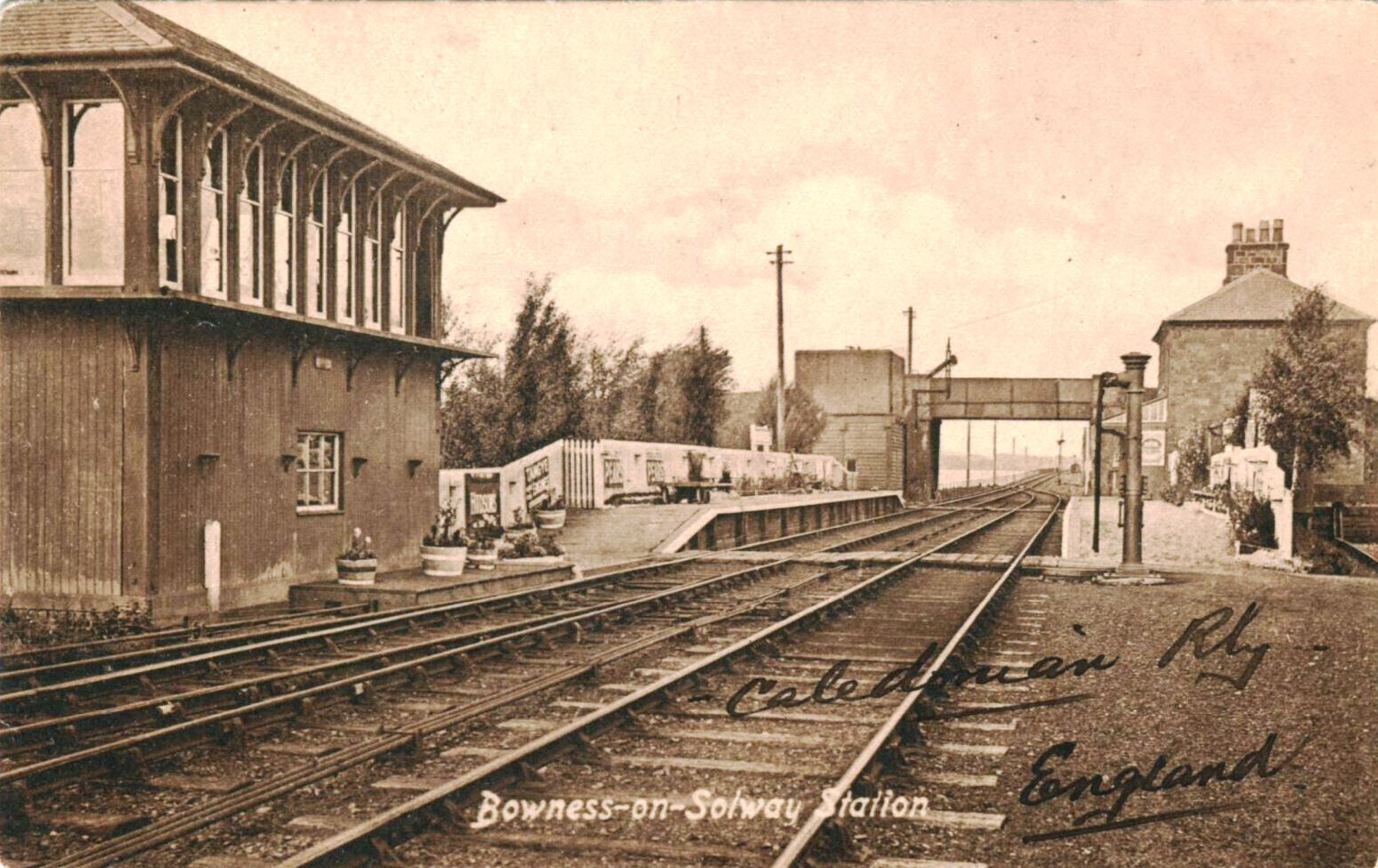

General information
- Location: Bowness-on-Solway, Cumbria; England
- Coordinates: 54.949214°N 3.229683°W
- Grid reference: NY213623
- Platforms: 2

Other information
- Status: Disused

History
- Original company: Solway Junction Railway
- Pre-grouping: Caledonian Railway

Key dates
- 8 August 1870: Opened
- September 1917: closed
- 1920: reopened
- 1 September 1921: Closed to all traffic
Location

Bowness was a station which served Bowness-on-Solway, a village in Cumbria on the English side of the Solway Firth. The station was opened on 8 August 1870 by the Caledonian Railway on a line constructed from the Caledonian Railway Main Line at Kirtlebridge across the Glasgow South Western Line, then forming the Solway Junction Railway over the Solway Viaduct to Brayton. The line had opened for freight from 13 September 1869.

== History ==
Bowness was opened by the Solway Junction Railway, then part of the Caledonian Railway. The passenger service was never well patronised, and it reduced to just one carriage at the front of an occasional goods train. In September 1917 this was suspended, but it was reinstated in 1920. Passenger services were finally withdrawn in 1921, and the line south of Annan over the Solway Viaduct was closed completely.

The station was only built as an afterthought following a petition from local people. It had two platforms, a signal box, cattle pens and an overbridge at the northern end. Old photographs show a carriage body on one platform as a shelter. In 1910 a water tank was located next to the overbridge and the platform beside the signal box had no buildings, not even a passenger shelter. In 1915 the signal box was open from 4 am to 8:30 pm.

Disused, the station became the property of the London, Midland and Scottish Railway in 1923 until sold together with the viaduct.

=== Solway railway viaduct ===
Beyond Bowness station the railway ran along an embankment and then crossed the estuary of the Solway upon an iron girder viaduct, one mile 176 yards in length. The local people's frustration at the delay in reopening the Solway Viaduct after it was damaged in 1881 is recorded in the newspapers of the day.

Preceding station	Historical railways	Following station
Annan Shawhill	Caledonian Railway; Solway Junction Railway	Whitrigg

=== Fate ===
The station house is now a private dwelling.
