= Whitrigg railway station =

Disused railway station in Cumbria, England

Whitrigg

General information
- Location: Whitrigg, Cumbria; England
- Coordinates: 54.908174°N 3.212369°W
- Grid reference: NY223577
- Platforms: 1

Other information
- Status: Disused

History
- Original company: Solway Junction Railway
- Pre-grouping: Caledonian Railway

Key dates
- 1 October 1870: Opened
- 1 September 1917: closed
- 1920: opened
- 1 September 1921: Station closed to all traffic
Location

Whitrigg was a railway station on the Bowness Moss which served Whitrigg, a hamlet in Cumbria on the English side of the Solway Firth. The station opened on 8 August 1870 by the Caledonian Railway on a line constructed from the Caledonian Railway Main Line at Kirtlebridge across the Glasgow South Western Line, then forming the Solway Junction Railway over the Solway Viaduct to Brayton. The line opened for freight on 13 September 1869.

== History ==
Whitrigg station was opened by the Solway Junction Railway, then part of the Caledonian Railway. At first the station was a 'flag' station or request stop with passengers wishing to alight informing the guard at Abbey Junction or Bowness, depending on their direction of travel. The gateman likewise signalled if a train was to stop. From 1 January 1873 a crossing keeper had been appointed and the level crossing itself signalled. North of the station was a goods siding, worked by a frame which was controlled by train tablet for the section Bowness and Kirkbride Junction.

The passenger service was never very well patronised and reduced to being just one carriage at the front of an occasional goods train and in September 1917 this was suspended, but was reinstated in 1920. Passenger services were finally withdrawn in 1921 and the line south of Annan over the Solway Viaduct was closed completely.

The station had one platform with a simple wooden station building. The closure of the station was directly linked to the closure of the Solway viaduct.

== Micro-history ==
The first up goods train used to call at Whitrigg to attach livestock wagons.

== The site today ==
The station waiting room and platform have been demolished and a private dwelling has been built on the site.

Preceding station	Historical railways	Following station
Bowness	Caledonian Railway; Solway Junction Railway	Sleightholme
