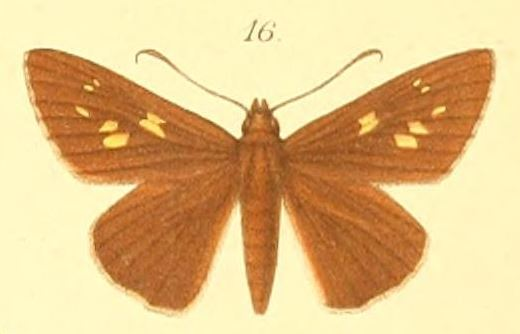

Scientific classification
- Kingdom: Animalia
- Phylum: Arthropoda
- Clade: Pancrustacea
- Class: Insecta
- Order: Lepidoptera
- Family: Hesperiidae
- Genus: Gretna
- Species: G. waga

Binomial name
- Gretna waga (Plötz, 1886)

Synonyms
- Telesto waga Plötz, 1886; Hesperia ilerda Möschler, 1887

= Gretna waga =

Species of butterfly

Gretna waga, also known as the common crepuscular skipper, is a species of butterfly in the family Hesperiidae. It is found in Senegal, the Gambia, Guinea, Sierra Leone, Liberia, Burkina Faso, Ivory Coast, Ghana, Togo, Nigeria, Cameroon, Gabon, the Republic of the Congo, the Democratic Republic of the Congo and Uganda. The habitat consists of forests and open areas in the forest zone.

Adults have been recorded feeding on the nectar of asclepiad flowers.

The larvae feed on Elaeis guineense.

Torben Larsen developed a species numbering system for his 2005 publication Butterflies of West Africa. This species is #1381. The 'Larsen' numbers have since been used with permission in A Sharp Eye on Butterflies of Ghana.
