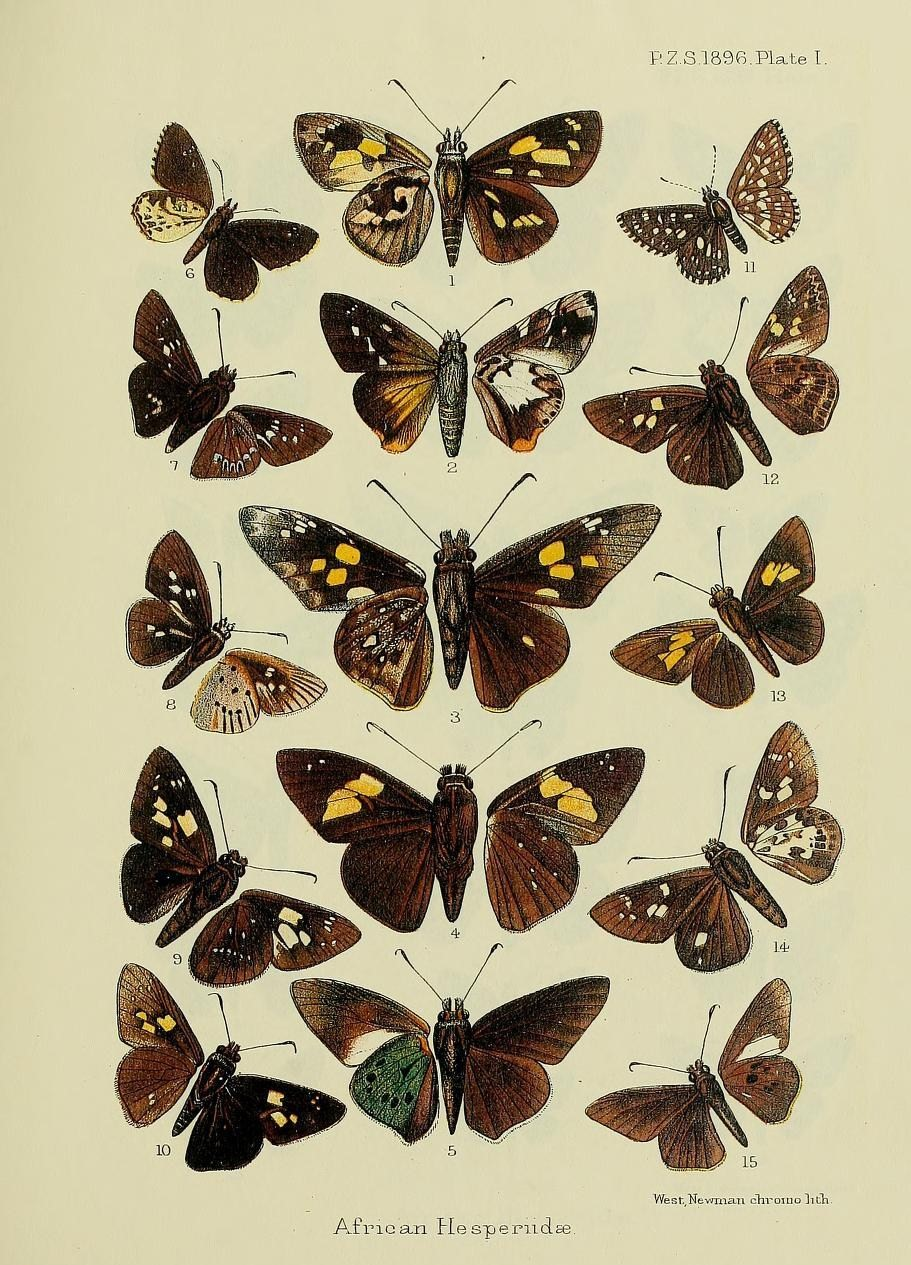
- Figure 3

Scientific classification
- Kingdom: Animalia
- Phylum: Arthropoda
- Class: Insecta
- Order: Lepidoptera
- Family: Hesperiidae
- Genus: Gretna
- Species: G. balenge

Binomial name
- Gretna balenge (Holland, 1891)

Synonyms
- Proteides balenge Holland, 1891

= Gretna balenge =

Species of butterfly

Gretna balenge, commonly known as the giant crepuscular skipper, is a species of butterfly in the family Hesperiidae. It is found in Sierra Leone, Liberia, Ivory Coast, Ghana, Togo, Nigeria, Cameroon, Gabon, the Central African Republic, the Democratic Republic of the Congo, Uganda, Tanzania and Zambia. The habitat consists of all areas where suitable palms grow.

Adults are attracted to various kinds of foul substances.

The larvae feed on Raphia farinifera and Eremospatha species.

== Subspecies ==
- Gretna balenge balenge - Nigeria, Cameroon, Gabon, Central African Republic, Democratic Republic of the Congo, western Uganda, north-western Tanzania, northern Zambia
- Gretna balenge zowa Lindsey & Miller, 1965 - Sierra Leone, Liberia, Ivory Coast, Ghana, Togo
