= Gretna carmen =

Scientific classification
- Kingdom: Animalia
- Phylum: Arthropoda
- Clade: Pancrustacea
- Class: Insecta
- Order: Lepidoptera
- Family: Hesperiidae
- Genus: Gretna
- Species: G. carmen

Binomial name
- Gretna carmen Evans, 1937

Species of butterfly

Gretna carmen, commonly known as the violet crepuscular skipper, is a species of butterfly in the family Hesperiidae. It is found in Ivory Coast, Ghana, Cameroon, the Central African Republic, the Democratic Republic of the Congo, Uganda, Kenya, Tanzania and Zambia..

The larvae feed on Raphia fanoidra, Phoenix, Borassus and Cocus species.

== Subspecies ==
- Gretna carmen carmen (Ivory Coast, Burkina Faso, Ghana, Cameroon, Central African Republic, Democratic Republic of the Congo, Uganda, western Kenya, western Tanzania)
- Gretna carmen capra Evans, 1937 (coast of Kenya, Tanzania: coast to the eastern shores of Lake Tanganyika, Zambia)

Torben Larsen developed a species numbering system for his 2005 publication Butterflies of West Africa. The nominate subspecies is #1382. The 'Larsen' numbers have since been used with permission in A Sharp Eye on Butterflies of Ghana.
