= Langholm railway station =

Disused railway station in Langholm, Dumfries and Galloway

Langholm
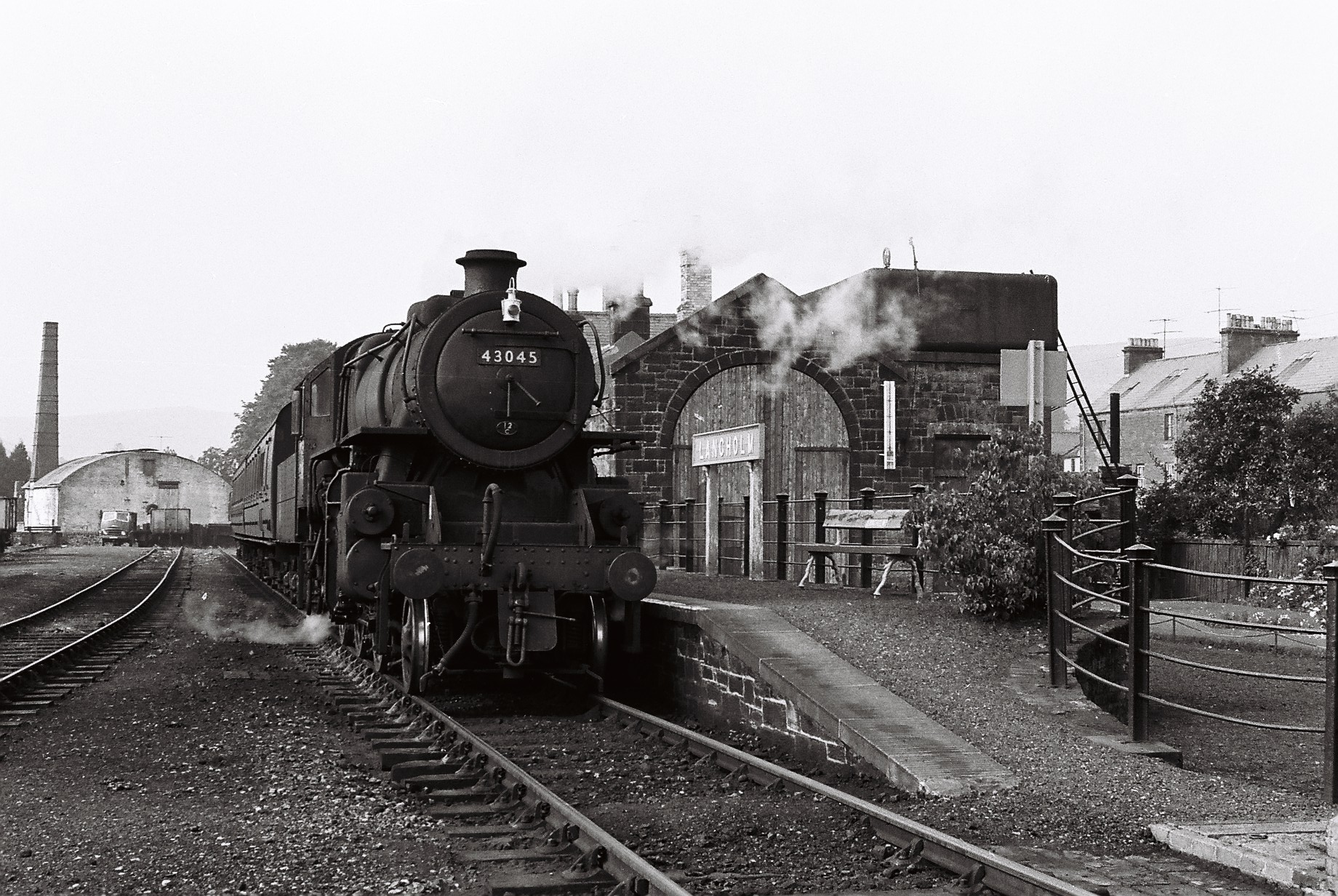
- Ex-LMS 2-6-0 loco with train at the station in 1962

General information
- Location: Langholm, Dumfries and Galloway; Scotland
- Coordinates: 55.149°N 2.9978°W
- Grid reference: NY365843
- Platforms: 1

Other information
- Status: Disused

History
- Original company: Border Union Railway
- Pre-grouping: North British Railway
- Post-grouping: LNER; British Rail (Scottish Region)

Key dates
- 18 April 1864: Opened
- 15 June 1964: Closed to passengers
- 18 September 1967: Closed completely
Location

Langholm railway station served the burgh of Langholm, Dumfries and Galloway, Scotland from 1864 to 1967 on the Border Union Railway.

== History ==
The station opened on 18 April 1864 by the Border Union Railway. It was originally planned to open a week earlier but problems were encountered with Byreburn Viaduct. The goods yard consisted of three sidings, one of which passed through a cattle dock and continued through a goods shed and out of the other end. After its closure to passengers on 15 June 1964, the station was still open to goods traffic, although the passenger track to the platform had been lifted. Final closure was on 18 September 1967.

Preceding station	Historical railways	Following station
Terminus	North British Railway; Border Union Railway	Gilnockie
