= Gilnockie railway station =

Disused railway station in Hollows, Dumfries and Galloway

Gilnockie
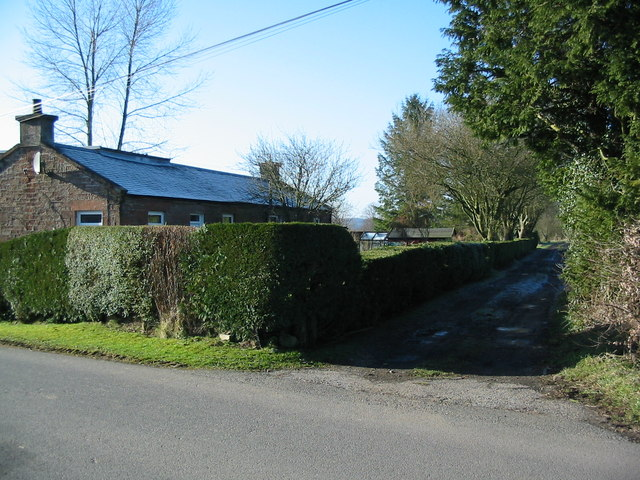

General information
- Location: Hollows, Dumfries and Galloway; Scotland
- Coordinates: 55.0968°N 2.9537°W
- Grid reference: NY392784
- Platforms: 1

Other information
- Status: Disused

History
- Original company: Border Union Railway
- Pre-grouping: North British Railway
- Post-grouping: LNER; British Rail (Scottish Region)

Key dates
- December 1864: Opened
- 15 June 1964: Closed to passengers
- 18 September 1967: Closed completely
Location

Gilnockie railway station served the hamlet of Hollows, Dumfries and Galloway, Scotland from 1864 to 1967 on the Border Union Railway.

== History ==
The station opened in December 1864 by the Border Union Railway. The station was situated on the west side of an unnamed minor road. Despite the station opening in December 1864, it actually didn't appear in the Bradshaw timetable until October 1865. A loop to the west of the station served a cattle dock and to the east a siding passed a brick plinth for a crane. The station was always quiet except the Second World War when Canadian foresters were working in the forest dispatching large amounts of timber from the goods yard. The station was unstaffed from 2 February 1953, although 'halt' didn't appear on the end of its name. However, the goods yard was downgraded to a public delivery siding. After closure to passengers on 15 June 1964, the station remained open to goods traffic until 18 September 1967.

The station remains today as a private residence. The station platform and crane plinth are still extant and remain part of the property, with the track bed now forming parts of historic Eskdale valley walks.

Preceding station	Disused railways	Following station
Langholm; Line and station closed	North British Railway; Border Union Railway	Canonbie; Line and station closed
