= Kirtlebridge railway station =

Former railway station in Scotland

Kirtlebridge
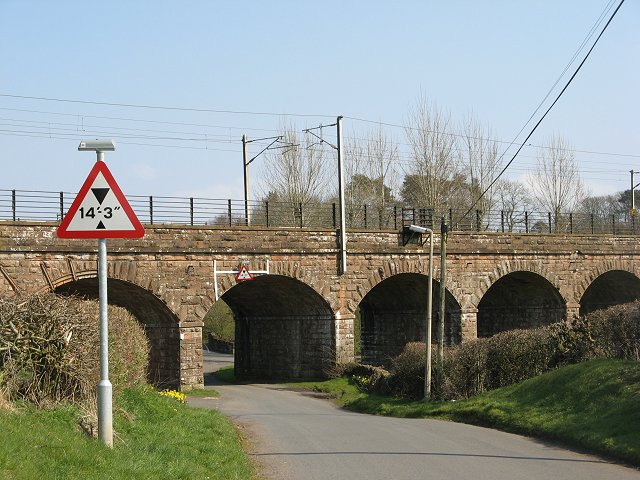
- Kirtlebridge Viaduct near the old station

General information
- Location: Ecclefechan, Dumfries and Galloway; Scotland
- Coordinates: 55.0502°N 3.2117°W
- Grid reference: NY2268373536
- Platforms: 2

Other information
- Status: Disused

History
- Original company: Caledonian Railway
- Pre-grouping: Caledonian Railway
- Post-grouping: London Midland and Scottish Railway

Key dates
- 10 September 1847: Station opened
- 13 June 1960: Station closed
Location

Kirtlebridge railway station was a station which served the rural area around Kirtlebridge and Eaglesfield, north of Annan in Dumfriesshire, Scotland; the location is now within the area of Dumfries and Galloway unitary council.

The station was served by local trains on the Caledonian Railway main line between Carlisle and Glasgow, now the West Coast Main Line, and the station was the junction for the Solway Junction Railway. The nearest station for Kirtlebridge is now at Lockerbie.

== History ==
Opened by the Caledonian Railway, it became part of the London Midland and Scottish Railway following the Grouping of 1923 and was then closed by British Railways in 1960. The station was the junction for the Solway Junction Railway, which connected the mineral districts of Cumberland and Westmoreland to the Caledonian line.

The station had a number of sidings, a goods shed, turntable, signal box, a bay platform and an interchange with the main line. A narrow gauge mineral line ran over the main line to serve local quarries and the old bridge survives as part of a narrow access lane.

Passenger services on the Solway line as far as Annan were withdrawn on 27 April 1931, the line south of Annan over the Solway Viaduct having already closed completely. Goods services were withdrawn on 28 February 1955.

== Accident ==
A rail crash that took place on 2 October 1872 when a night express passenger train from London ran at 40 mph into a shunting goods train. Eleven passengers and one engineman were killed.

== Location ==
Preceding station	Historical railways	Following station
Kirkpatrick; Line open; Station closed	Caledonian Railway; Main Line	Ecclefechan; Line open; Station closed
	Disused railways	
Terminus	Caledonian Railway; Solway Junction Railway	Annan Shawhill; Line and station closed

== The site today ==
Trains pass at speed on the electrified West Coast Main Line. The station has been demolished and the M74 runs over part of the old station site. The Station Hotel stood nearby, but it has also been demolished.
