= Gretna bugoma =

Scientific classification
- Kingdom: Animalia
- Phylum: Arthropoda
- Class: Insecta
- Order: Lepidoptera
- Family: Hesperiidae
- Genus: Gretna
- Species: G. bugoma

Binomial name
- Gretna bugoma Evans, 1947

Species of butterfly

Gretna bugoma is a species of butterfly in the family Hesperiidae. It is found in Uganda (from the western part of the country to the Bugoma Forest).
