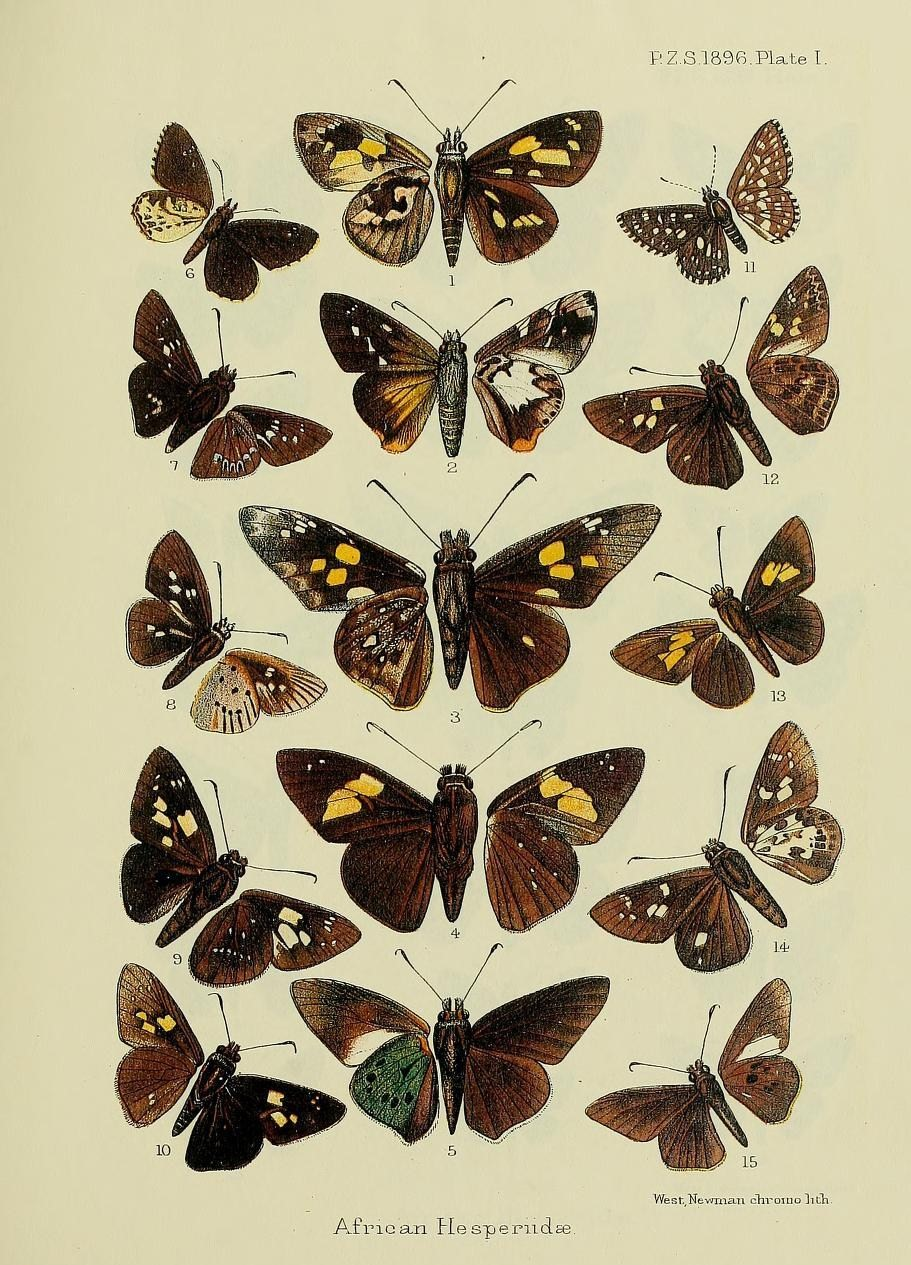
- Figure 14

Scientific classification
- Domain: Eukaryota
- Kingdom: Animalia
- Phylum: Arthropoda
- Class: Insecta
- Order: Lepidoptera
- Family: Hesperiidae
- Genus: Gretna
- Species: G. lacida

Binomial name
- Gretna lacida (Hewitson, 1876)

Synonyms
- Hesperia lacida Hewitson, 1876

= Gretna lacida =

Species of butterfly

Gretna lacida, commonly known as the scarce crepuscular skipper, is a species of butterfly in the family Hesperiidae. It is found in Sierra Leone, Liberia, Ivory Coast, possibly Nigeria, Cameroon, Gabon, the Republic of the Congo and the central part of the Democratic Republic of the Congo. The habitat consists of forests.
