= Ecclefechan railway station =

Former railway station in Scotland

Ecclefechan
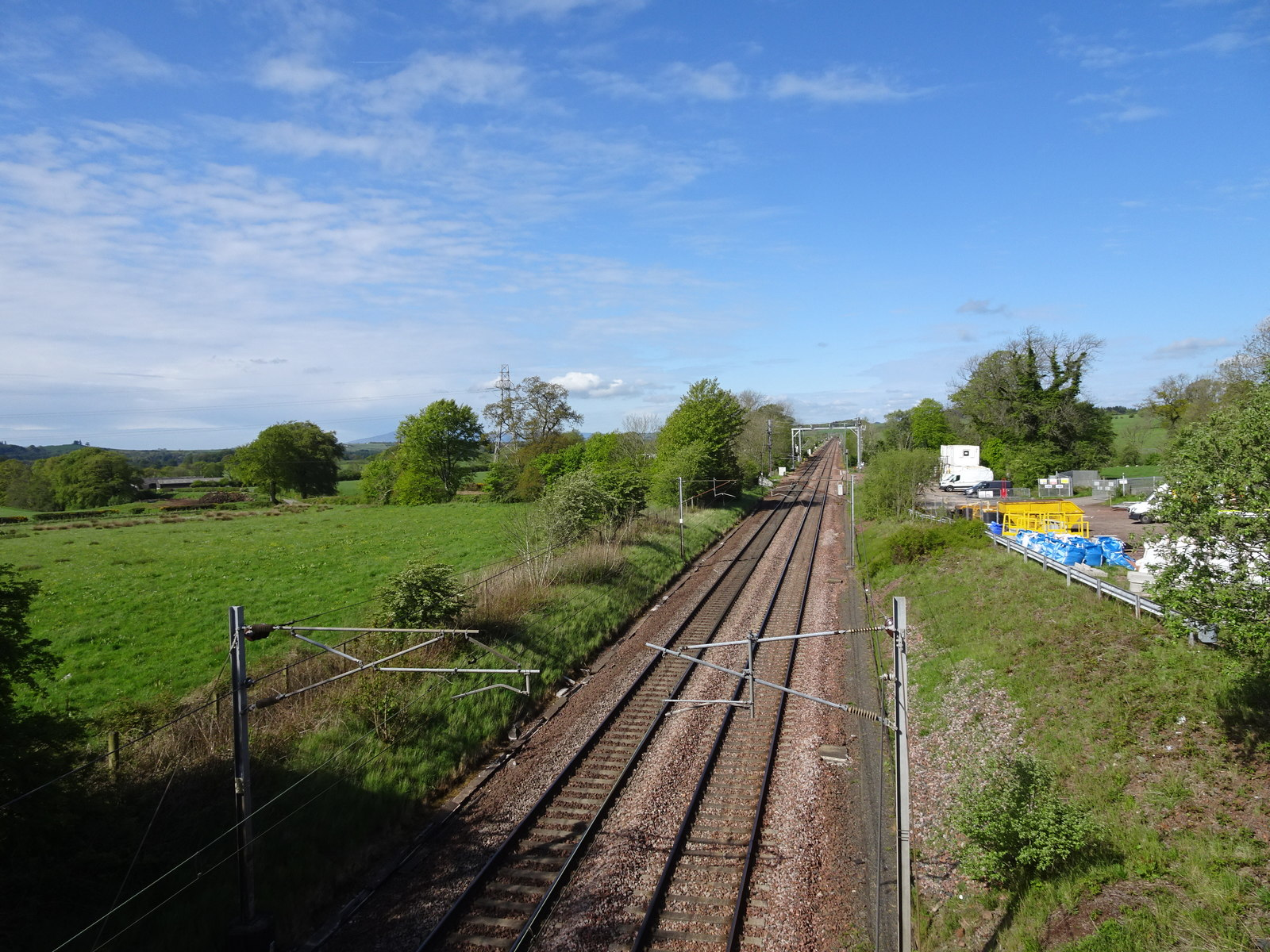
- The site of the station in 2019

General information
- Location: Ecclefechan, Dumfries and Galloway; Scotland
- Coordinates: 55.0665°N 3.2837°W
- Grid reference: NY1811575423
- Platforms: 2

Other information
- Status: Disused

History
- Original company: Caledonian Railway
- Pre-grouping: Caledonian Railway
- Post-grouping: London Midland and Scottish Railway

Key dates
- 10 September 1847: Station opens
- 13 June 1960: Station close
Location

Ecclefechan railway station was a station which served the rural area around Ecclefechan, south of Lockerbie in Applegarth parish, Scottish county of Dumfries and Galloway. It was served by local trains on what is now known as the West Coast Main Line. The nearest station for Ecclefechan is now at Lockerbie.

== History ==
Opened by the Caledonian Railway, it became part of the London Midland and Scottish Railway during the Grouping of 1923 and was then closed by British Railways in 1960. The station had a goods shed with a signal box on the platform next to it. Several sidings were present and a minor road to Nether Collinhirst had run through the site.

== Accidents and incidents ==
- On 28 January 1854 an accident occurred near Ecclefechan when a goods train which left Glasgow for Carlisle on the evening of the 27th, was, after repeated mishaps, brought to a stand between the Ecclefechan and Kirtlebridge stations. The train was run into by a passenger train going in the same direction, at 2 1/2 miles (4 km) from Ecclefechan. The injuries to the passengers were not serious; two ladies suffered slightly, and the driver was hurt when he jumped from the engine of the passenger train, which, as well as the van of the goods train, was badly damaged.
- On 21 July 1945, an express passenger train overran signals and was in collision with a freight train that was being shunted. Two people were killed and 31 were injured.

== The site today ==
Preceding station	Historical railways	Following station
Kirtlebridge; Line open; Station closed	Caledonian Railway; Main Line	Lockerbie; Line open; Station open

Trains pass at speed on the electrified West Coast Main Line. The station has been demolished, however part of one of the platforms survives.
