= Annan Shawhill railway station =

Disused railway station in Dumfries and Galloway, Scotland

Annan Shawhill
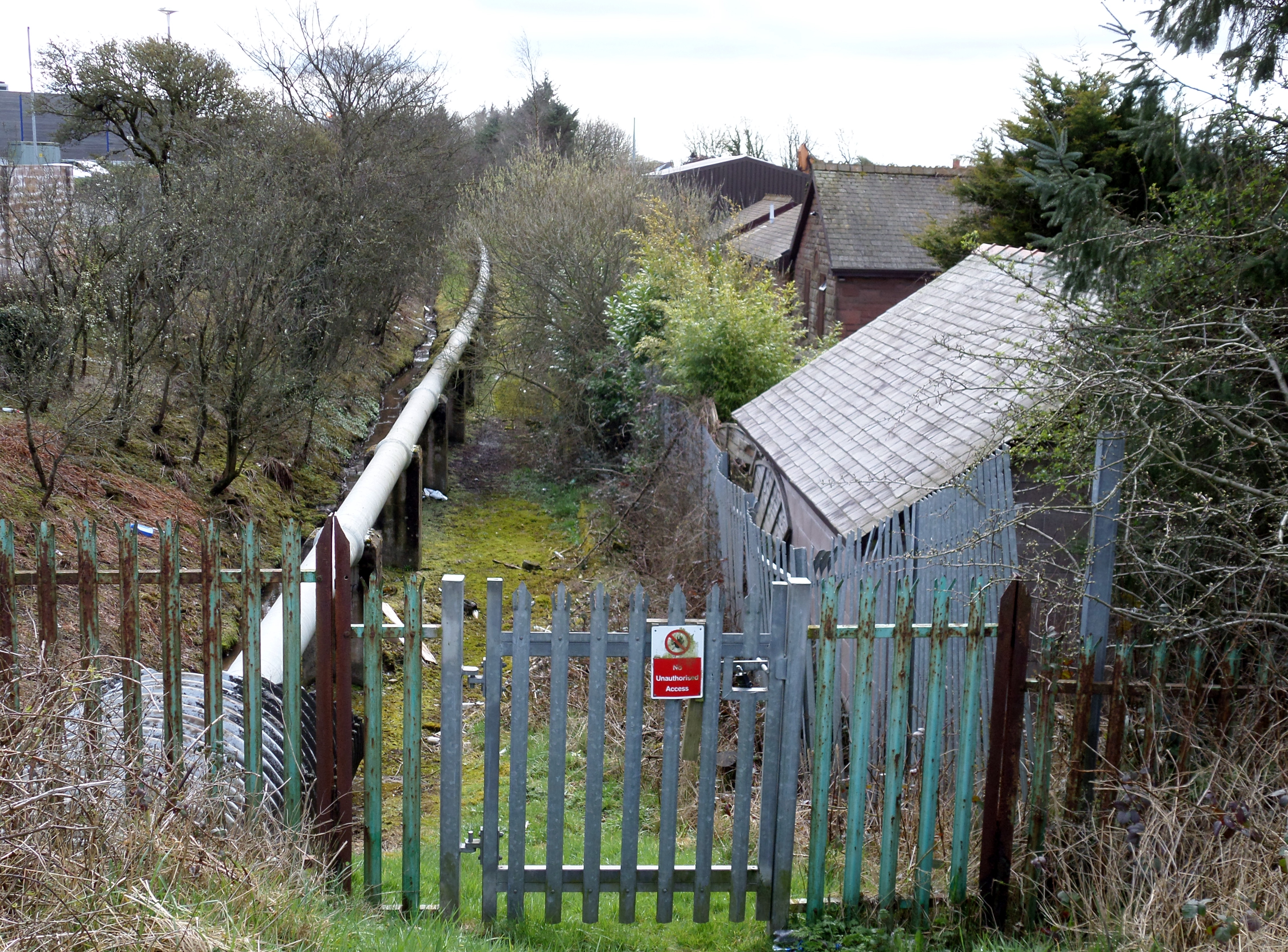
- The site of the station in 2016

General information
- Location: Dumfries and Galloway; Scotland
- Coordinates: 54.9860°N 3.2505°W
- Platforms: 1

Other information
- Status: Disused

History
- Original company: Solway Junction Railway
- Pre-grouping: Caledonian Railway
- Post-grouping: London Midland and Scottish Railway

Key dates
- 8 August 1870: Station opened as Annan
- 1 January 1917: Closed
- 2 March 1919: Re-opened
- 2 June 1924: Station renamed Annan Shawhill
- 27 April 1931: Station closed to passenger traffic
- 1955: Station closed for freight traffic
Location

Annan Shawhill was a station on the Solway Junction Railway at Annan in Dumfries and Galloway, Scotland. The branch line ran between a junction with the Caledonian Railway Main Line at Kirtlebridge, across the Glasgow South Western Line, over the Solway Viaduct into Cumberland, England. The station opened for passenger services in 1870. Passenger services were withdrawn in the early 1930s when the cost of maintaining the Solway Viaduct was deemed too high to sustain. Although the line to England was removed, the Scottish part of the branch to Annan Shawhill remained opened for freight until it was finally closed in the 1950s.

== History ==
The station was opened by the Solway Junction Railway in 1870, a year after the completion of the line. The SJR was then part of the Caledonian Railway before becoming part of the London Midland and Scottish Railway after the Grouping in 1923.

The fate of the line was sealed in 1921 when the wooden railway viaduct across the Solway Firth was closed because it had become too costly to maintain. Its rising cost of repairs and maintenance was due to its susceptibility to damage in winter from floating ice. Falling mineral traffic from the Cumberland Coalfields also made the line through Annan Shawhill uncompetitive and loss making.

In 1931, passenger services were withdrawn when the line south of Annan across the Solway Firth was officially closed. However, the line remained open from Annan to Kirtlebridge for freight traffic until 1955 when it was closed completely. In 1965 the station's surviving goods shed along with the line's trackbed was reused for a waste water pipeline from Chapelcross nuclear power station. The station house at Annan Shawhill is now a private dwelling.

The town of Annan continues to be served by the Annan railway station on the Glasgow South Western Line.

== Services ==
Preceding station	Historical railways	Following station
Kirtlebridge; Caledonian main line	Caledonian Railway; Solway Junction Railway	Bowness; Solway Junction Railway

== Notes ==
=== Sources ===
- Butt, R. V. J. (October 1995). The Directory of Railway Stations: details every public and private passenger station, halt, platform and stopping place, past and present (1st ed.). Sparkford: Patrick Stephens Ltd. ISBN 978-1-85260-508-7. OCLC 60251199. OL 11956311M.
- Jowett, Alan (March 1989). Jowett's Railway Atlas of Great Britain and Ireland: From Pre-Grouping to the Present Day (1st ed.). Sparkford: Patrick Stephens Ltd. ISBN 978-1-85260-086-0. OCLC 22311137.
- Jowett, Alan (2000). Jowett's Nationalised Railway Atlas (1st ed.). Penryn, Cornwall: Atlantic Transport Publishers. ISBN 978-0-906899-99-1. OCLC 228266687.
- Mullay, A. J. (1990). Rails across the border: the story of Anglo-Scottish Railways. Wellingborough: Patrick Stephens Limited. ISBN 1-85260-186-8.
- Railways of the Solway Plain
- Station on navigable O.S. map Route of line crosses open railway line to the east of current station (Start of former Solway Bridge can be seen)
