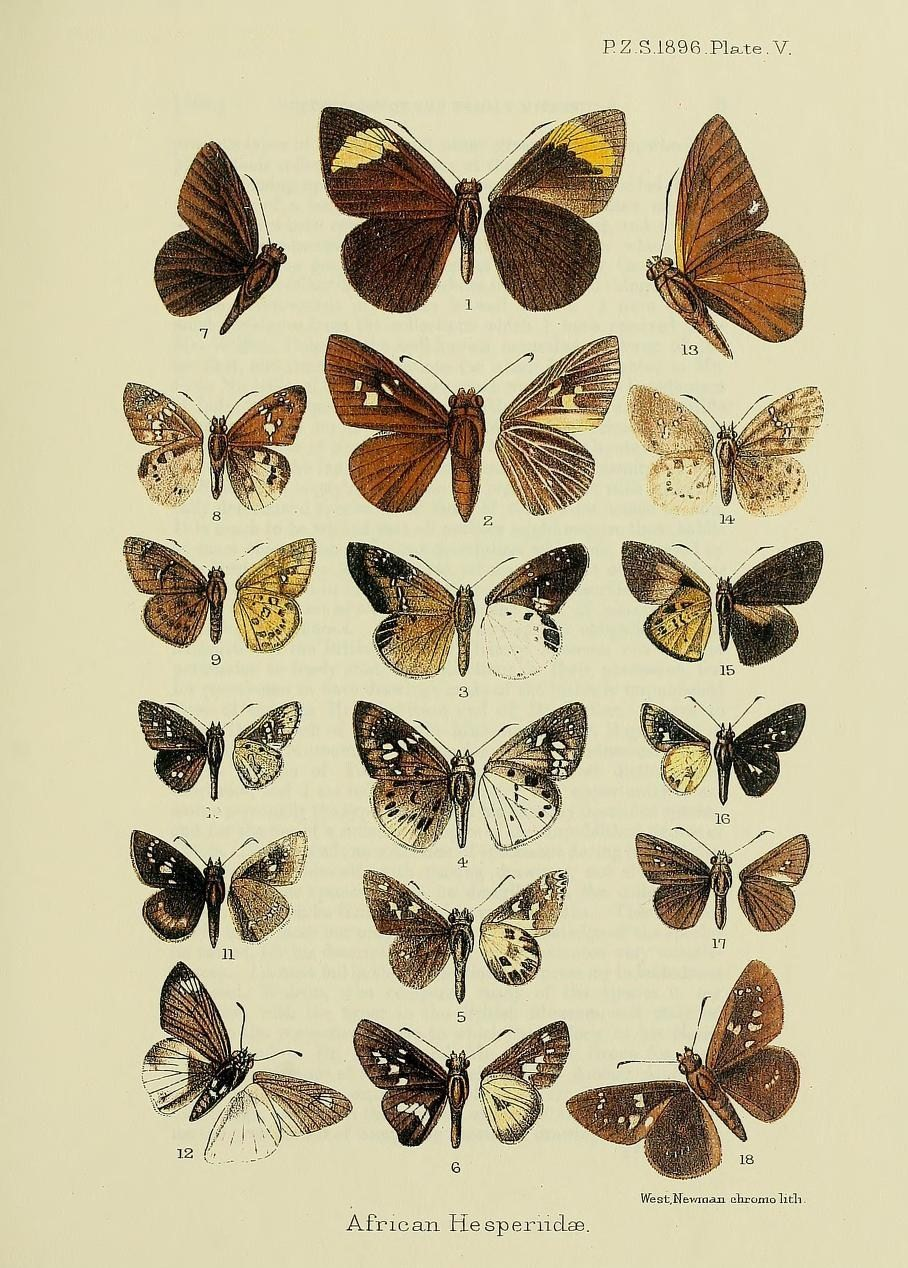
- Figure 5

Scientific classification
- Kingdom: Animalia
- Phylum: Arthropoda
- Class: Insecta
- Order: Lepidoptera
- Family: Hesperiidae
- Genus: Gretna
- Species: G. zaremba

Binomial name
- Gretna zaremba (Plötz, 1884)

Synonyms
- Telesto zaremba Plötz, 1884

= Gretna zaremba =

Species of butterfly

Gretna zaremba, commonly known as the variegated crepuscular skipper, is a species of butterfly in the family Hesperiidae. It is found in Nigeria, Cameroon, the Republic of the Congo, the Central African Republic and Uganda. The habitat consists of forests.

== Subspecies ==
- Gretna zaremba zaremba (Nigeria: Cross River loop, Cameroon, Congo, Central African Republic)
- Gretna zaremba jacksoni Evans, 1937 (Uganda)
