= Scotch Dyke railway station =

Railway station in Carlisle, England

Coordinates: 55.0417°N 2.9601°W

Scotch Dyke
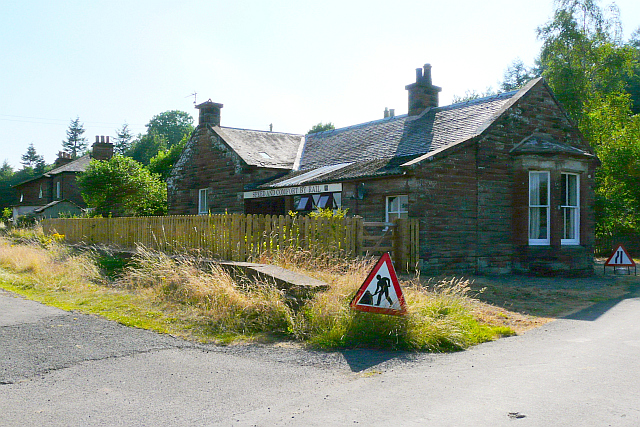
- The site of the station in 2013

General information
- Location: Cumbria; England
- Platforms: 2

Other information
- Status: Disused

History
- Original company: Border Union Railway
- Pre-grouping: North British Railway
- Post-grouping: LNER; British Railways

Key dates
- 25 October 1861: Opened
- 2 May 1949: Closed
Location

Scotch Dyke railway station was a railway station in Cumberland close to the Scots' Dike, the traditional border with Scotland.

== History ==
The station was opened on 25 October 1861 by the Border Union Railway as 'Scotsdyke' and later renamed 'Scotch Dyke'. It was a two-platform station with a level crossing to its north.

The station closed on 2 May 1949. The line was closed to all traffic by British Railways on 5 January 1969, and dismantled in 1971, see Border Union Railway.

Today (2006) the former station retains its building and platforms. The canopy of the building has a script reading "Speed and comfort by rail".

| Preceding station | Disused railways | Following station |
|---|---|---|
| Riddings Junction; Line and station closed | North British Railway; Waverley Route | Longtown; Line and station closed |
