= Canonbie railway station =

Disused railway station in Canonbie, Dumfries and Galloway

Canonbie
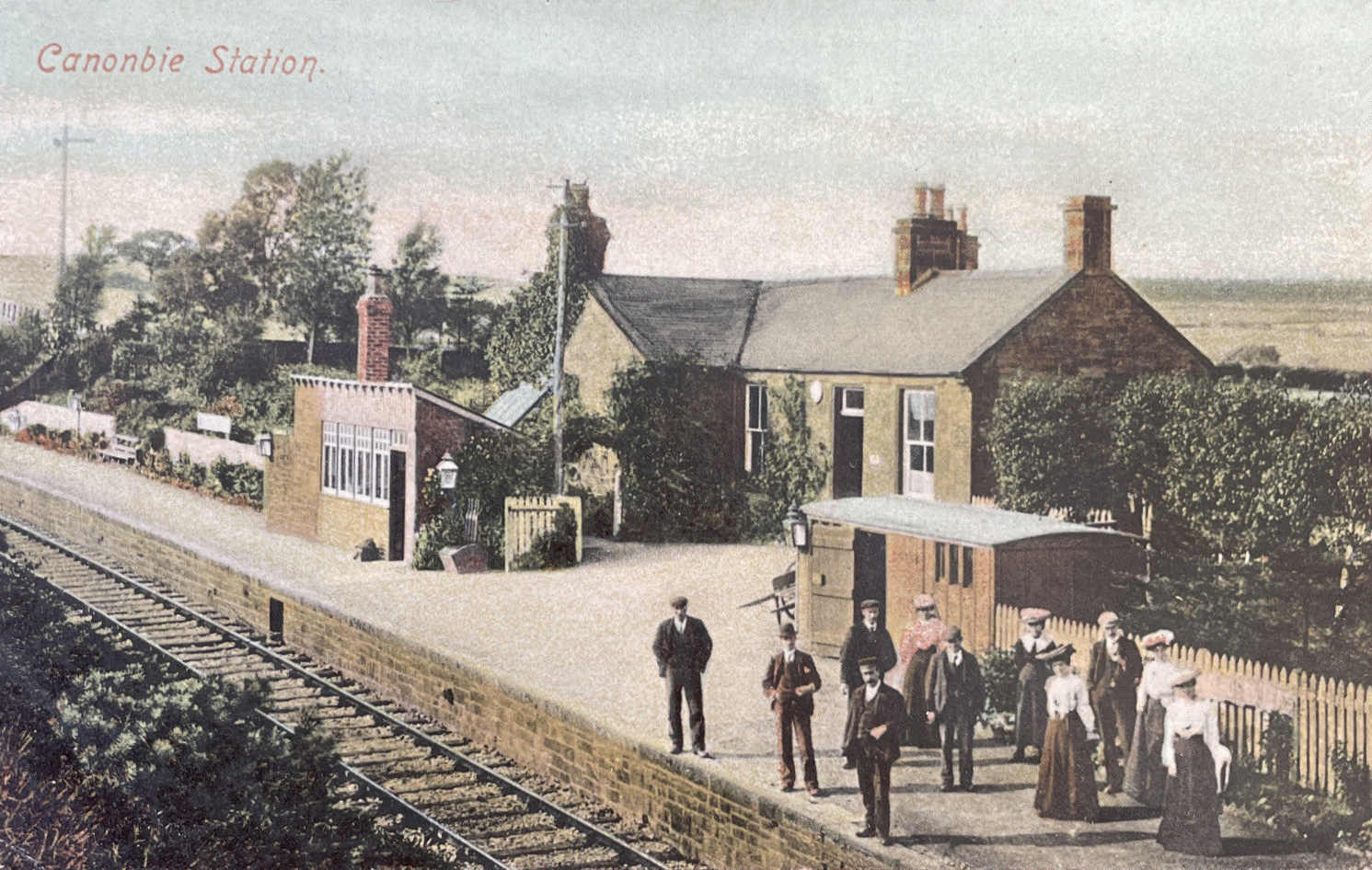
- Canonbie station looking north about 1905

General information
- Location: Canonbie, Dumfries and Galloway; Scotland
- Coordinates: 55.0848°N 2.9309°W
- Grid reference: NY406771
- Platforms: 1

Other information
- Status: Disused

History
- Original company: Border Union Railway
- Pre-grouping: North British Railway
- Post-grouping: LNER; British Rail (Scottish Region)

Key dates
- 5 May 1862: Opened as Canobie
- 1 February 1904: Name changed to Canonbie
- 15 June 1964: Closed to passengers
- 18 September 1967: Closed completely
Location

Canonbie railway station served the village of Canonbie, Dumfries and Galloway, Scotland from 1862 to 1967 on the Border Union Railway.

== History ==
The station opened on 5 May 1862 (its first appearance in the Bradshaw timetable) as Canobie by the Border Union Railway. The station was situated on the north side of the B6357. The station's name was changed to Canonbie on 1 February 1904. The goods yard consisted of a loop serving a two-level cattle dock. To the north was a timber goods shed. After closure to passengers on 15 June 1964, the station remained open to goods traffic until 18 September 1967.

Preceding station	Disused railways	Following station
Gilnockie; Line and station closed	North British Railway; Border Union Railway	Riddings Junction; Line and station closed
