= Gretna leakeyi =

Scientific classification
- Kingdom: Animalia
- Phylum: Arthropoda
- Class: Insecta
- Order: Lepidoptera
- Family: Hesperiidae
- Genus: Gretna
- Species: G. leakeyi

Binomial name
- Gretna leakeyi Collins & Larsen, 1995

Species of butterfly

Gretna leakeyi is a species of butterfly in the family Hesperiidae. It is found in Cameroon.
