= Riddings Junction railway station =

Disused railway station in Cumbria, England

Riddings Junction

General information
- Location: Cumbria; England
- Coordinates: 55.067°N 2.9297°W
- Grid reference: NY407751
- Platforms: 3

Other information
- Status: Disused

History
- Original company: Border Union Railway
- Pre-grouping: North British Railway
- Post-grouping: LNER; British Rail (Scottish Region)

Key dates
- 1 March 1862: Opened
- 15 June 1964: Closed to passengers
- 2 January 1967: Closed completely
Location

Riddings Junction railway station was a railway station in Cumbria, England, from 1862 to 1967 on the Border Union Railway.

== History ==
The station opened on 1 March 1862 by the Border Union Railway. The station was situated at the end of an unnamed minor road. The goods yard was moderately sized and was on a lower level than the station. It was composed of three sidings, the siding to the north serving a cattle dock and pens. The station closed to passengers on 15 June 1964. The station remained open to goods traffic although it was downgraded to a public delivery siding on 8 November 1965 and it closed on 2 January 1967.

Preceding station	Disused railways	Following station
Scotch Dyke; Line and station closed	North British Railway; Border Union Railway	Penton; Line and station closed
Scotch Dyke; Line and station closed	North British Railway; Border Union Railway	Canonbie; Line closed, station closed
