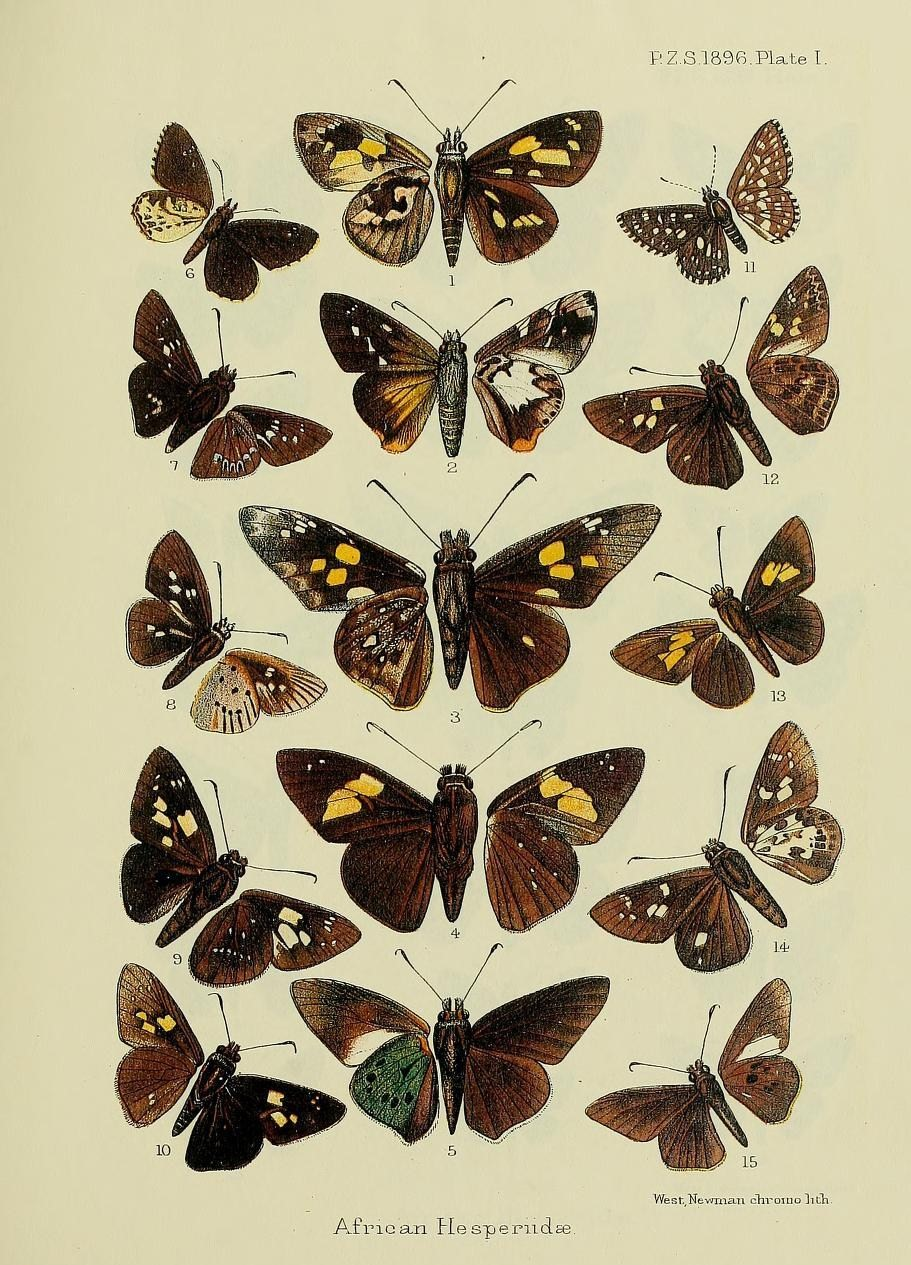
- Figure 12

Scientific classification
- Kingdom: Animalia
- Phylum: Arthropoda
- Clade: Pancrustacea
- Class: Insecta
- Order: Lepidoptera
- Family: Hesperiidae
- Genus: Gretna
- Species: G. cylinda

Binomial name
- Gretna cylinda (Hewitson, 1876)

Synonyms
- Hesperia cylinda Hewitson, 1876; Proteides ruralis Mabille; Holland, 1896

= Gretna cylinda =

Species of butterfly

Gretna cylinda, commonly known as the lesser crepuscular skipper, is a species of butterfly in the family Hesperiidae. It is found in Sierra Leone, Liberia, Ivory Coast, Ghana, Togo, Nigeria, Cameroon, Gabon, the Republic of the Congo, the Central African Republic, Angola, the Democratic Republic of the Congo, southern Sudan, Uganda and north-western Tanzania. The habitat consists of forests.

Adults are attracted to flowers, including those of Clerodendron splendens.

The larvae feed on Trachyphrynium braunianum, Thalia welwitschii and Marantochloa cuspidata.

Torben Larsen developed a species numbering system for his 2005 publication Butterflies of West Africa. This species is #1383. The 'Larsen' numbers have since been used with permission in A Sharp Eye on Butterflies of Ghana.
