= Gretna, Dumfries and Galloway =

Coordinates: 54.994°N 3.062°W

Gretna: Scottish Gaelic: Greatna
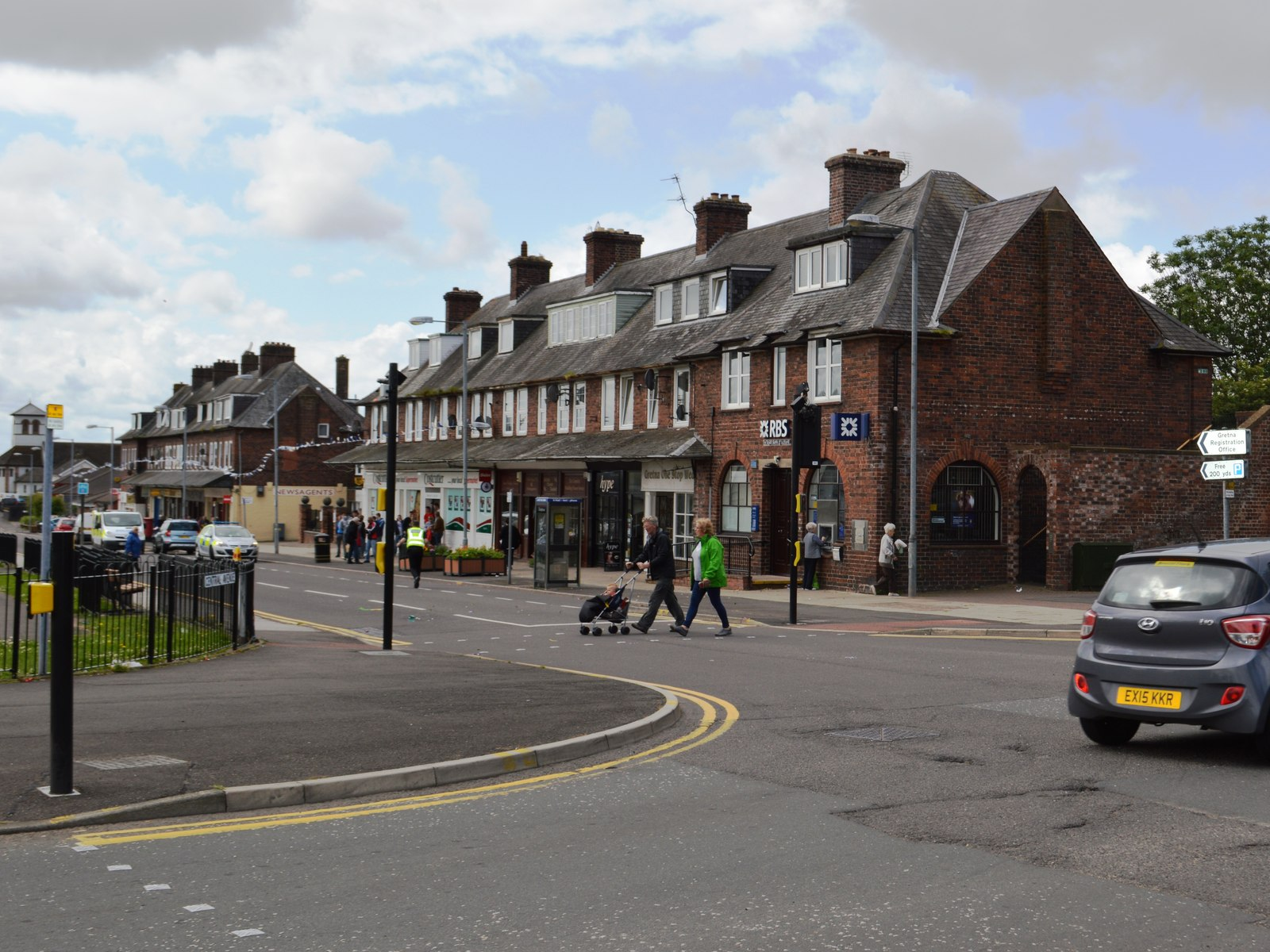
- Central Avenue, Gretna

- Location within Dumfries and Galloway
- Population: 3,110 (2020)
- OS grid reference: NY320671
- Council area: Dumfries and Galloway
- Lieutenancy area: Dumfries
- Country: Scotland
- Sovereign state: United Kingdom
- Post town: GRETNA
- Postcode district: DG16
- Dialling code: 01461
- Police: Scotland
- Fire: Scottish
- Ambulance: Scottish
- UK Parliament: Dumfriesshire, Clydesdale and Tweeddale
- Scottish Parliament: Dumfriesshire

Gretna is a town in Dumfries and Galloway, Scotland, originally part of the historic county of Dumfriesshire. It is located close to the A74(M) on the border of Scotland and England and near the mouths of the rivers Esk and Sark. Gretna was built from 1915 and is about 1km south of the older village Gretna Green.

The town is situated 22 mi (35 km) east-south-east of Dumfries, 8 mi (13 km) east of Annan, 10 mi (16 km) north-west of Carlisle, 88 mi (142 km) south-east of Glasgow and 89.5 mi (144 km) south of Edinburgh.

== History ==
=== First World War ===
HM Factory, Gretna, codenamed Moorside, was a cordite munitions factory built between Gretna Green and the Solway Firth to supply ammunition to British forces during the First World War. This developed into the town of Gretna.

=== 1941 bombing ===
Gretna was bombed on 7 April 1941 by an aircraft that had earlier taken part in a raid near Glasgow. Twenty-eight people were killed.

== Transport ==
=== Rail ===
In the 1840s, there were three main railway companies building lines around Gretna, and this resulted in three railway stations named "Gretna". The first station called "Gretna" was opened by the Glasgow, Dumfries and Carlisle Railway on 23 August 1843. The station was renamed Gretna Green railway station in April 1852. It closed on 6 December 1965, but a new station was opened by British Rail nearby on 20 September 1993. The station is served by Glasgow South Western Line. This station had a new platform added in 2009, to coincide with the redoubling of this section of track. The other two stations were located a short distance to the east of Gretna, over the border in England. Gretna (Caledonian) railway station was opened on 9 September 1847 by the Caledonian Railway on its main line between Carlisle and Glasgow and Edinburgh. The station closed on 10 September 1951. The North British Railway built Gretna (Border Union) railway station next to the Caledonian station, at Gretna junction, on its short link to the Border Union Railway. The station opened on 1 November 1861 and closed during World War One on 9 August 1915.

=== Roads ===
A military road was built in 1763 by General Wade linking Gretna to Portpatrick, then the main ferry port to Northern Ireland. This was later to become the route of much of the A75 road to Stranraer. The original route between Gretna and Annan is now the B721 road, and the A75 diverges significantly from it; similarly, the B724 was the original route between Annan and Dumfries.

The main Anglo-Scottish trunk road running north-south through Gretna was the A74 road. With the opening of the M6 motorway to the south of Carlisle in December 1970, most of the A74 in Scotland was upgraded to motorway, these upgraded sections were renamed the A74(M). The Cumberland Gap was the remaining six miles (ten kilometres) of non-upgraded dual-carriageway A74 between the northern terminus of the M6 at Carlisle.

In 2008, the six remaining miles were upgraded to a three-lane motorway.

== Sport ==
Gretna was the official home of Gretna Football Club, who played in the Scottish Premier League during the 2007–2008 season. A reformed club, Gretna F.C. 2008 is based in Gretna.

AFC Gretna are the town's amateur football team who like to give local players a chance. The club, based in the nearby Springfield, played in the DSAFL. However, they now play in the Carlisle City Sunday League system.

Border Towns United are another amateur football team in the town, formed in 2022. The club also play in the Carlisle City Sunday League system in the same league as AFC Gretna. They play at the Gartney.

== Gretna Green ==
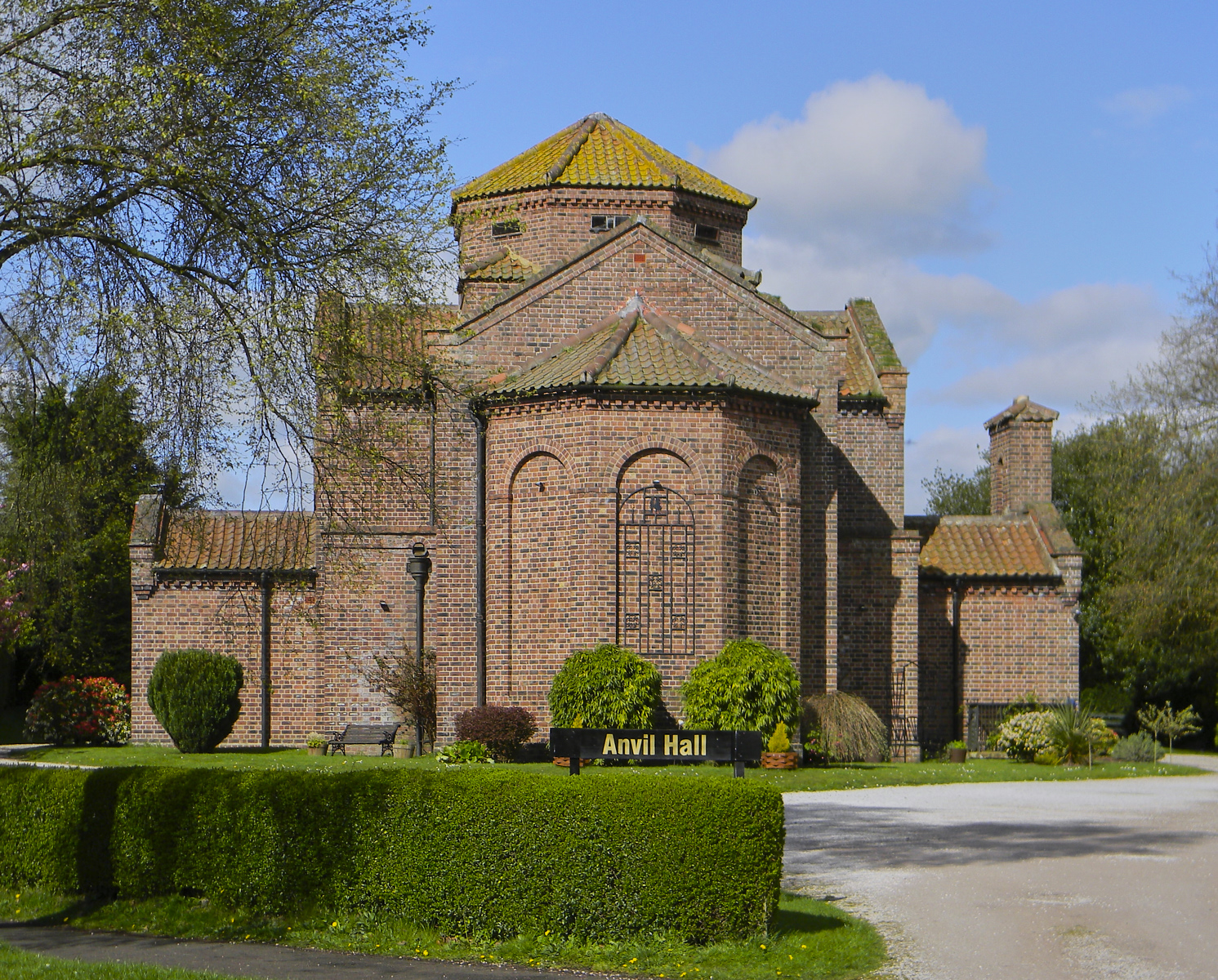
St Ninian's RC Church, now a dedicated wedding venue

Nearby Gretna Green, is traditionally associated with eloping English couples because of the more liberal marriage provisions in Scots law compared to English law. Because of this, "Gretna" has become a term for a place for quick, easy marriages.

== Shopping ==
Gretna Gateway Outlet Village is a shopping centre on the east side of Gretna. In 2021, this was renamed Caledonia Park.

== In popular culture ==
Gretna is shown and mentioned explicitly in the BBC Drama series Nightsleeper when the train is passing over Quintinshill near Gretna Green. It is also Mentioned at the end of the series when Abby Aysgarth (Played by Actress Alexandra Roach) has a phone call with Paul Peveril (Played by Actor David Threlfall) when Paul says that he gave an RV to Abby at Gretna.

Gretna is also the primary location for the Action Film Zombies Have Fallen by Director Sam Fountayne. It’s used for most of the film when Kyra (Played by Actress Tansy Parkinson) arrives there at the start of the film looking for a man named John Northwood (Played by Actor Heath Hampson). The scene would then follow into a brawl inside Gretna’s The Chapel which was unfortunately permanently closed.

Gretna is Mentioned in the BBC Documentary Series A Different League when Gretna F.C. are up against Ross County F.C.

== Media ==
=== Television ===
Local television news programmes that cover the town are:

- BBC Reporting Scotland broadcasting from Glasgow.
- ITV News Lookaround which broadcast from Gateshead.
- BBC Look North which broadcasts from Newcastle.

=== Radio ===
Radio stations are served by:

- BBC Radio Scotland on 94.7 FM
- BBC Radio Cumbria on 95.6 FM
- Greatest Hits Radio Dumfries & Galloway on 103.0 FM
- GFM Radio on app, website and alexa

=== Newspapers ===
The local newspaper is The Dumfries Courier which publishes on Fridays.
