= Longtown railway station =

Disused railway station in Longtown, Cumbria

Longtown
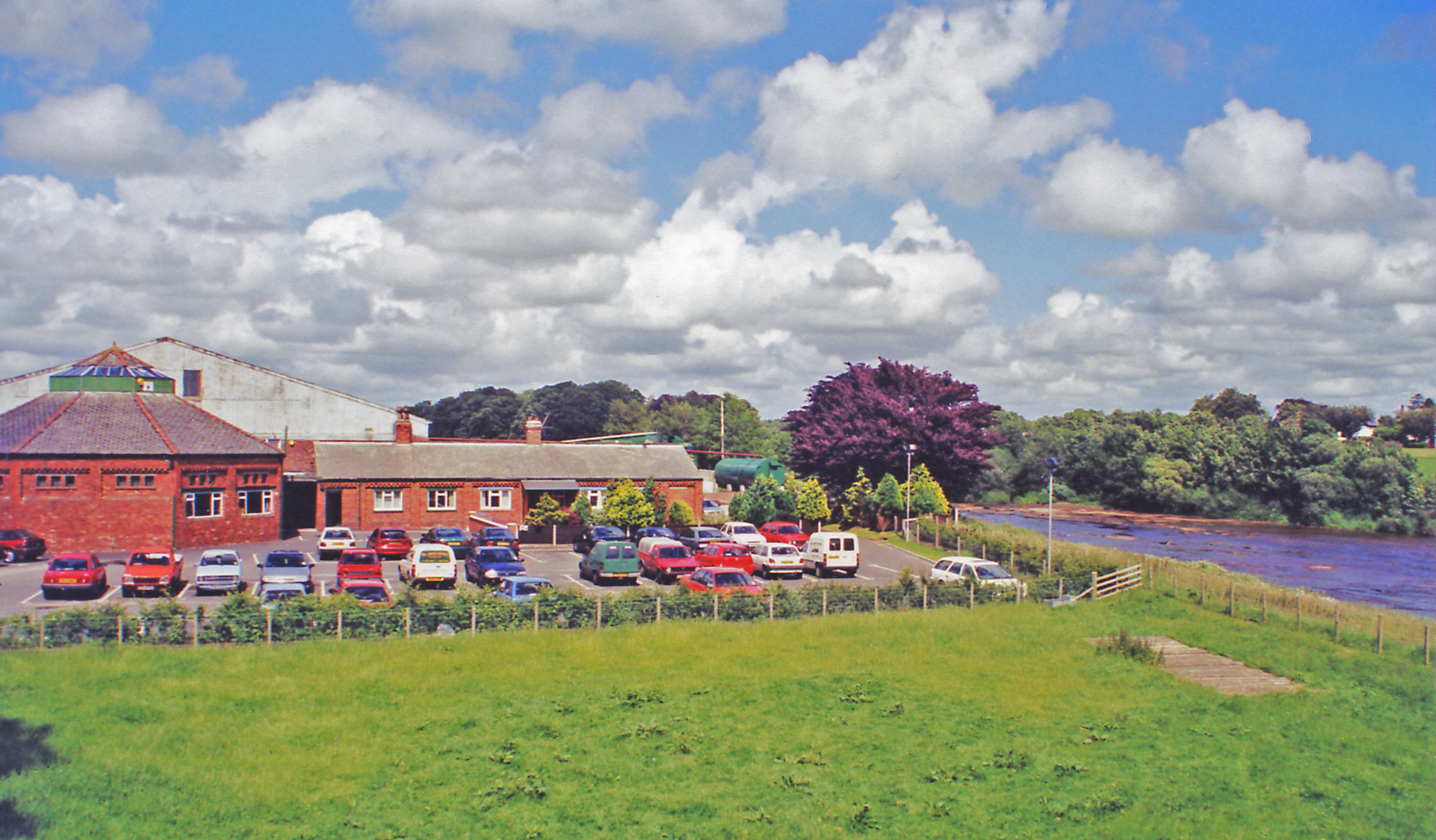
- The site of the station, looking north from the A6071, in 2000

General information
- Location: Longtown, Cumbria; England
- Coordinates: 55.012079°N 2.976512°W
- Grid reference: NY376690
- Platforms: 2

Other information
- Status: Disused

History
- Original company: North British Railway
- Post-grouping: London and North Eastern Railway

Key dates
- 29 October 1861: Opened
- 6 January 1969: Closed to passengers
- 31 August 1970: Closed completely
Location

Longtown railway station served the town of Longtown, Cumbria, England, from 1861 to 1970 on the Waverley Route.

== History ==
The station opened on 29 October 1861 by the North British Railway. The station was situated on the north side of the A7. There was a goods yard to the north of the station and had five sidings in total; the fifth running to the end of a cattle dock. The siding at the rear of the yard served a coal and lime depot. A two road engine shed opened to the north side of the station on 15 October 1861 but closed in 1924 and was demolished shortly after. The station closed in 1969, although the line was still open for goods traffic to the army depot, until the station closed completely in 1970.

Preceding station	Disused railways	Following station
Scotch Dyke; Line and station closed	North British Railway; Waverley Route	Gretna; Line and station closed
Scotch Dyke; Line and station closed	North British Railway; Waverley Route	Lyneside; Line and station closed
