= Gretna railway station (Caledonian Railway) =

Former railway station in Cumbria, England

Gretna
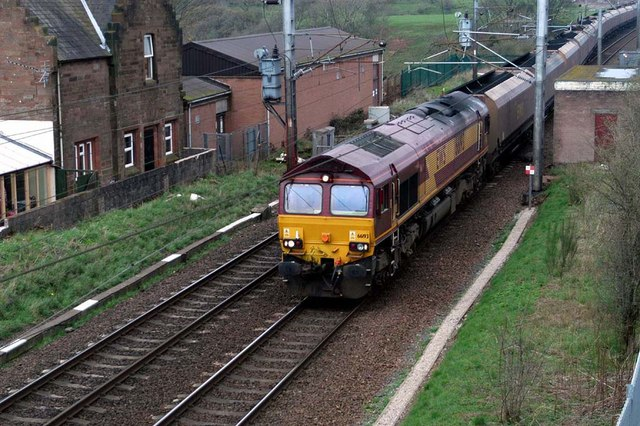
- 66139 passes the former station building at Gretna in 2005.

General information
- Location: Near Gretna Green, Cumbria; England
- Coordinates: 54.997°N 3.042°W
- Platforms: 2

Other information
- Status: Disused

History
- Original company: Caledonian Railway
- Post-grouping: LMS

Key dates
- 9 September 1847: Opened
- 10 September 1951: Closed
Location

Gretna railway station was a railway station close to Gretna Green in Scotland. The Caledonian Railway, however, built the station just south of Gretna Junction and the England/Scotland border, in Cumberland (now Cumbria).

== History ==
The station opened on 9 September 1847. It closed on 10 September 1951.

Very little remains of the station in 2008.

The Caledonian Railway station was one of three serving Gretna, the others being:

- Gretna built by Glasgow, Dumfries and Carlisle Railway in 1848 (successor station open)
- Gretna built by the Border Union Railway in 1861, closing in 1915.

A short distance to the north on the Caledonian Railway are Quintinshill loops, the site of the rail crash in 1915.

Preceding station	Historical railways	Following station
Floriston; Line open; station closed	Caledonian Railway; CR Main Line	Kirkpatrick; Line open; station closed
connenction to GD&CR	Glasgow and South Western Railway; Glasgow, Dumfries and Carlisle Railway	Gretna Green; Line and station open
Longtown; Line and station closed	North British Railway; Border Union Railway	connenction to BUR
