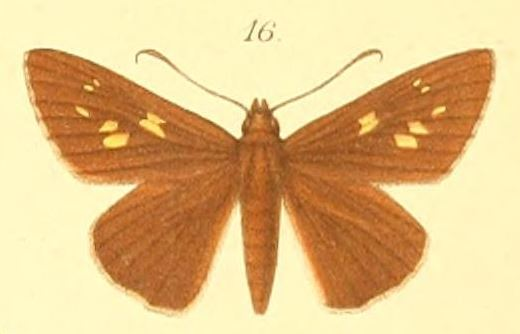
- Gretna waga

Scientific classification
- Kingdom: Animalia
- Phylum: Arthropoda
- Class: Insecta
- Order: Lepidoptera
- Family: Hesperiidae
- Tribe: Gretnini; Grishin, 2019
- Genus: Gretna; Evans, 1937

= Gretna (skipper) =

Genus of butterflies

Gretna is a genus of skipper butterflies in the family Hesperiidae. It is the only genus in the monotypic tribe Gretnini.

== Species ==
- Gretna balenge (Holland, 1891)
- Gretna bugoma Evans, 1947
- Gretna carmen Evans, 1937
- Gretna cylinda (Hewitson, 1876)
- Gretna lacida (Hewitson, 1876)
- Gretna leakeyi Collins & Larsen, 1995
- Gretna waga (Plötz, 1886)
- Gretna zaremba (Plötz, 1884)
