= Gretna railway station (Border Union Railway) =

Former railway station in Scotland

Gretna

General information
- Location: Near Gretna Green, Cumbria; England
- Coordinates: 54.9975°N 3.0413°W
- Platforms: 2

Other information
- Status: Disused

History
- Original company: Border Union Railway
- Pre-grouping: North British Railway

Key dates
- 1 November 1861: Opened
- 9 August 1915: Closed
Location

Gretna railway station was a railway station close to Gretna Green in Scotland although the station was on the English side of the border. However the Border Union Railway built the station adjacent to the Caledonian Railway's Gretna station south on Gretna Junction and in the England/Scotland border in Cumbria.

== History ==
The station opened on 1 November 1861. It closed on 9 August 1915.

As with the adjacent Caledonian station, very little remains of the station in 2008.

The Border Union Railway station was one of three serving Gretna, the others being:

- Gretna built by Glasgow, Dumfries and Carlisle Railway in 1848 (successor station open)
- Gretna built by the Caledonian Railway in 1847, closing in 1951.

Preceding station	Disused railways	Following station
Terminus	North British Railway; Waverley Route	Longtown; Line and station closed
