= Gretna Green railway station =

Railway station in Dumfries and Galloway, Scotland

Gretna Green
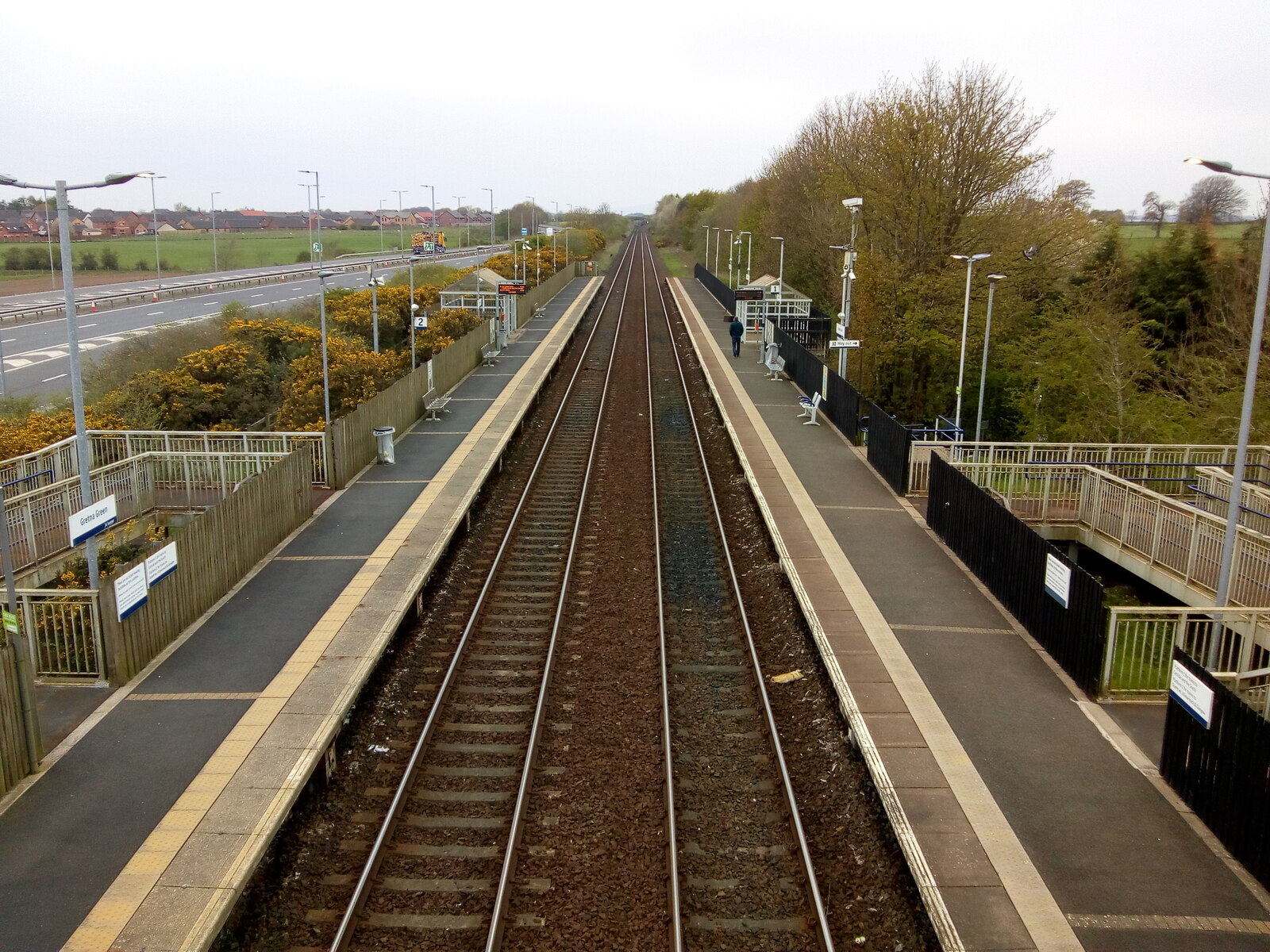
- View west towards Annan

General information
- Location: Gretna Green, Dumfries and Galloway; Scotland
- Coordinates: 55°00′03″N 3°03′59″W
- Grid reference: NY319678
- Owner: Network Rail
- Manager: ScotRail
- Platforms: 2
- Tracks: 2

Other information
- Station code: GEA

History
- Original company: Glasgow, Dumfries and Carlisle Railway
- Pre-grouping: Glasgow and South Western Railway
- Post-grouping: London, Midland and Scottish Railway; British Rail (Scottish Region)

Key dates
- 23 August 1848: Opened as Gretna
- April 1852: Renamed Gretna Green
- 6 December 1965: Closed
- 20 September 1993: Resited and reopened

Passengers
- 2021/22: ▲29,484
- 2022/23: ▲37,404
- 2023/24: ▲51,334
- 2024/25: ▲51,464
- 2025/26: ▲56,302
Location
- Location within Dumfries and Galloway
Notes
- Passenger statistics from the Office of Rail and Road

Gretna Green is a railway station on the Glasgow South Western Line, which runs between Carlisle and Glasgow Central via Kilmarnock. The station, situated 9 miles 58 chains (16 km) north-west of Carlisle, serves the town of Gretna and village of Gretna Green in Dumfries and Galloway, Scotland. It is owned by Network Rail and managed by ScotRail.

== History ==
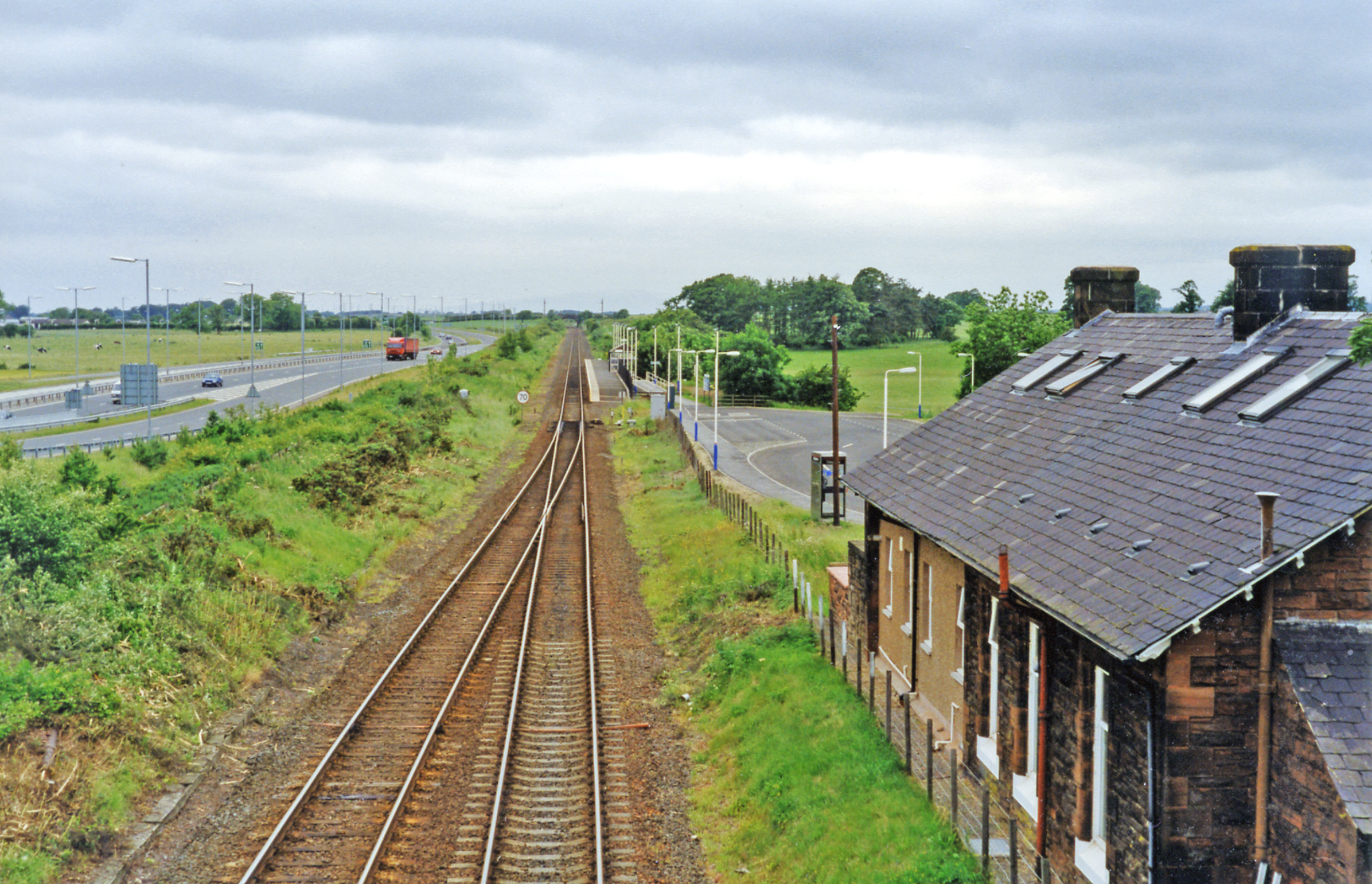
The station in 1997

The station was opened by the Glasgow, Dumfries and Carlisle Railway on 23 August 1848 as Gretna. The Glasgow and South Western Railway renamed the station Gretna Green in April 1852.

On 6 December 1965, the station was closed and the station building was subsequently sold. In 1975, the site of the station became the eastern end of a single line section to Annan, as part of the route rationalisation carried out by British Rail, following the electrification of the West Coast Main Line.

The station was reopened on 20 September 1993 by British Rail, with just one platform on the northern side of the line to the west of the previous station, coinciding with the western end of the points marking the end of the single track section from Annan. The second platform came into use when the line to Annan was restored to double track in August 2008.

The Glasgow, Dumfries and Carlisle Railway station was one of three serving the town of Gretna, the others being:

- Gretna, built by the Caledonian Railway. Opened on 9 September 1847 and closed on 10 September 1951.
- Gretna, built by the Border Union Railway. Opened on 1 November 1861 and closed on 9 August 1915.

== Services ==
Following the May 2021 timetable change, there is a mostly an uneven hourly to 2 hourly service (Monday to Saturday) heading north-west towards Dumfries, with seven trains of these to Glasgow Central via Kilmarnock. On Sunday, there are five trains per day to Dumfries, two of which extend to Glasgow Central. Heading south-east towards Carlisle, there is a mostly hourly service. All services are operated by ScotRail.

Services running through Carlisle to Newcastle were stopped at the May 2022 timetable change.

Rolling stock used: Class 156 Super Sprinter

Preceding station	National Rail	Following station
Carlisle	ScotRail; Glasgow South Western Line	Annan
	Historical railways	
Gretna (CR); Line open; station closed	Glasgow and South Western Railway; Glasgow, Dumfries and Carlisle Railway	Rigg; Line open; station closed

== Sources ==
- Butt, R. V. J. (October 1995). The Directory of Railway Stations: details every public and private passenger station, halt, platform and stopping place, past and present (1st ed.). Sparkford: Patrick Stephens Ltd. ISBN 978-1-85260-508-7. OCLC 60251199. OL 11956311M.
- Jowett, Alan (March 1989). Jowett's Railway Atlas of Great Britain and Ireland: From Pre-Grouping to the Present Day (1st ed.). Sparkford: Patrick Stephens Ltd. ISBN 978-1-85260-086-0. OCLC 22311137.
- Jowett, Alan (2000). Jowett's Nationalised Railway Atlas (1st ed.). Penryn, Cornwall: Atlantic Transport Publishers. ISBN 978-0-906899-99-1. OCLC 228266687.
- RAILSCOT on the Glasgow, Dumfries and Carlisle Railway
- Original Gretna Green railway station on a navigable Ordnance Survey map
