= Causewayhead railway station =

Disused railway station in Cumbria, England

Causewayhead

General information
- Location: Causewayhead, Cumberland; England
- Coordinates: 54.8629°N 3.3657°W
- Grid reference: NY124528
- Platforms: 1

Other information
- Status: Disused

History
- Original company: Carlisle & Silloth Bay Railway & Dock Company

Key dates
- November 1856: In Bradshaw as "Causey Head"
- 1857: Amended in Bradshaw to "Causewayhead"
- April 1859: Last appeared in Bradshaw
Location

Causewayhead or, originally, Causey Head, was an early, short lived railway station near Causewayhead, Cumbria on the Carlisle & Silloth Bay Railway & Dock Company's branch from Carlisle to Silloth

The station served the small hamlet of Causewayhead and its rural surrounds.

Its timetable entries show trains calling on Saturdays Only. It only appeared in public timetables from November 1856 to April 1859. The 18 September 1856 entry in a contemporary journal states that "[locomotives]...generally call at Causeway Head to quench the thirst of the Steam Horse. They pump the water out of the beck."

By 1866 no trace of a station could be seen on OS maps, though a building – almost certainly the crossing keeper's cottage - is clear. It is possible that this was a "use it or lose it" stopping place where no platforms were built.

The level crossing required the services of a crossing keeper until the line closed in 1964.

== History ==
The North British Railway (NBR) leased the line from the Carlisle & Silloth Bay Railway & Dock Company in 1862, and absorbed them in 1880, The NBR, in turn, was absorbed into the London and North Eastern Railway in 1923, passing to British Railways in 1948.

Preceding station	Disused railways	Following station
Blackdyke Halt; Line and station closed	Carlisle and Silloth Bay Railway	Silloth; Line and station closed
Blackdyke Halt; Line and station closed	Carlisle and Silloth Bay Railway	Silloth Convalescent Home; Line and station closed
Blackdyke Halt; Line and station closed	Carlisle and Silloth Bay Railway	Silloth Battery Extension; Line and station closed
