= Abbey Town railway station =

Disused railway station in Cumbria, England

Abbey Town
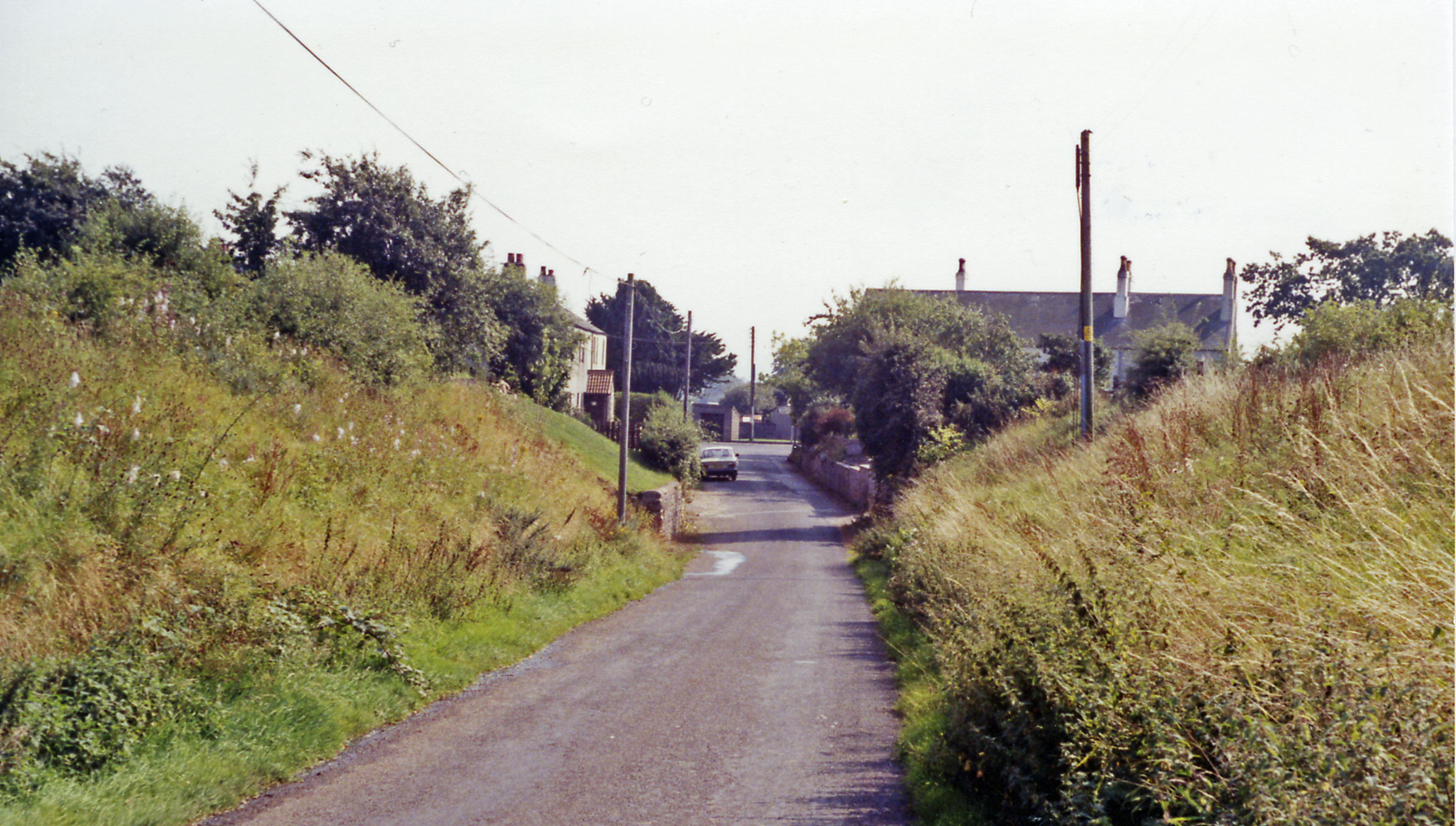
- Location of the former station (1991)

General information
- Location: Abbey Town, Cumberland; England
- Coordinates: 54.8459°N 3.2877°W
- Grid reference: NY174508
- Platforms: 1

Other information
- Status: Disused

History
- Opened: 22 August 1856
- Original company: Carlisle and Silloth Bay Railway
- Pre-grouping: North British Railway
- Post-grouping: London and North Eastern Railway

Key dates
- 22 August 1856: Station opened as Abbey
- August 1889: Renamed Abbey Town
- 7 September 1964: Station closed
Location

Abbey Town railway station was on the branch line off the Solway Junction Railway in the English county of Cumberland (later Cumbria). The first station after Abbey Junction on the branch to Silloth on the Solway Firth, it served the village of Abbey Town. The station closed with the line to Silloth in 1964.

== History ==
Opened as Abbey by the Carlisle and Silloth Bay Railway in 1856, then renamed Abbey Town by the North British Railway in 1889, it became part of the London and North Eastern Railway during the Grouping of 1923. The station then passed on to the London Midland Region of British Railways on nationalisation in 1948. The station closed on 7 September 1964.

== Further material ==
- Oatway, Jim (2003) [1964]. Cumberland Glory (DVD). Ultimate Archive Steam. Uffington, Shropshire: B&R Video Productions. Vol 44.

Preceding station	Disused railways	Following station
Sleightholme; Line and station closed	North British Railway; Carlisle and Silloth Bay Railway	Black Dyke Halt; Line and station closed
