= Kirkbride railway station =

Disused railway station in Cumbria, England

Kirkbride

General information
- Location: Kirkbride, Cumberland; England
- Coordinates: 54.8992°N 3.2032°W
- Grid reference: NY229567
- Platforms: 1

Other information
- Status: Disused

History
- Original company: Carlisle and Silloth Bay Railway
- Pre-grouping: North British Railway
- Post-grouping: London and North Eastern Railway

Key dates
- 22 August 1856: Station opened
- 7 September 1964: Station closed
Location

Kirkbride was a stone and brick built railway station with a single platform on the Carlisle and Silloth Bay Railway on the Solway Plain in Cumbria, England.

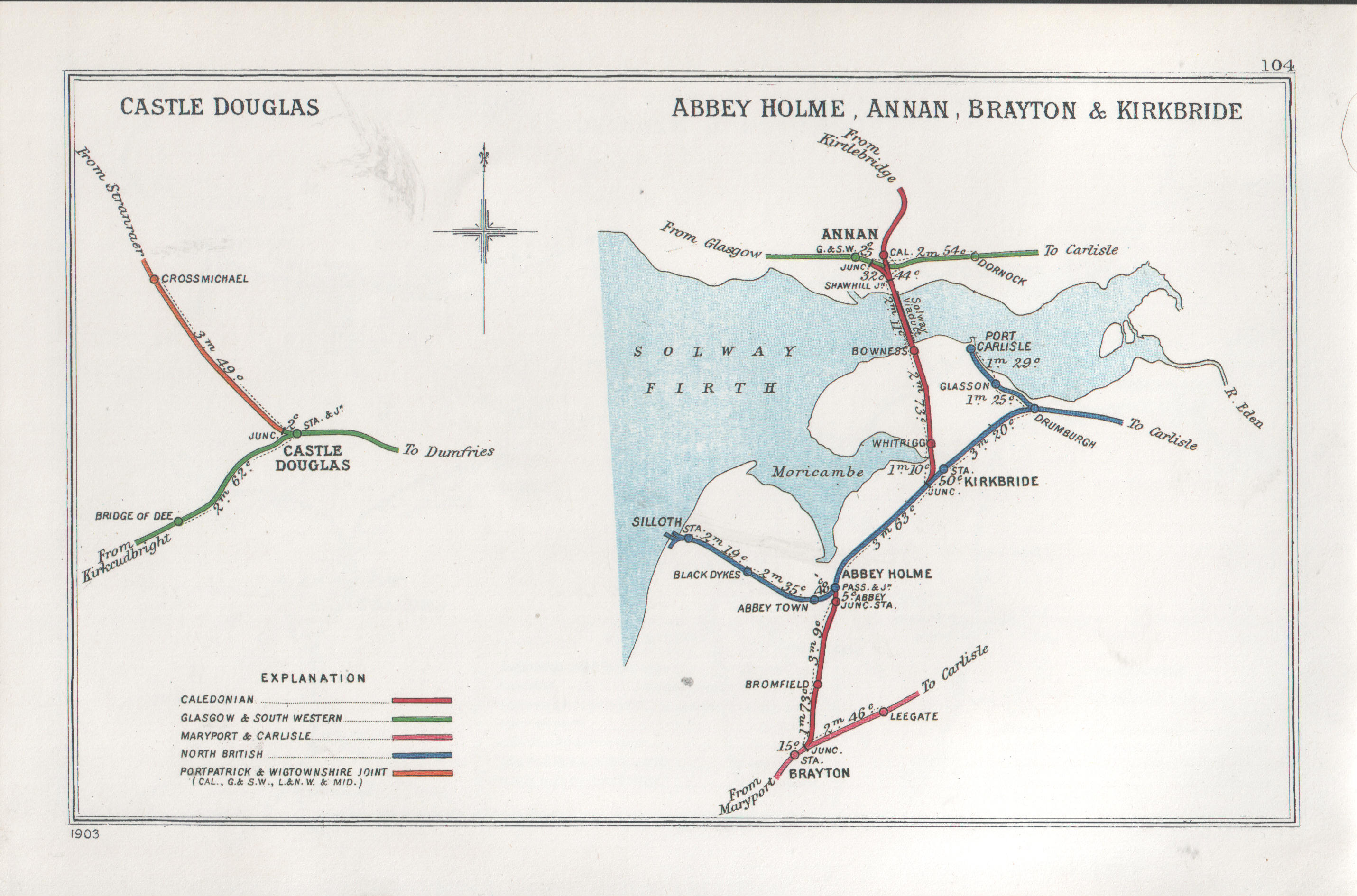
A 1903 Railway Clearing House Junction Diagram showing (right) railways in the vicinity of Kirkbride

The station opened in August 1856 with the line's extension to Silloth. The North British Railway leased the line and the station in 1862 and subsequently took it over in 1880. In 1923 the station became part of the London and North Eastern Railway and became part of British Railways after nationalisation in 1948. The station closed with the line on 7 September 1964.

The platform has been demolished, but in 2013 the station house still existed as a private residence.

Preceding station	Disused railways	Following station
New Dykes Brow; Line and station closed	North British Railway; Carlisle & Silloth Bay Railway & Dock Company	Abbey Junction; Line and station closed
