= New Dykes Brow railway station =

Disused railway station in Cumbria, England

New Dykes Brow

General information
- Location: 1 mile NW of Fingland, Cumberland; England
- Coordinates: 54.9086°N 3.1850°W
- Grid reference: NY241577
- Platforms: 1

Other information
- Status: Disused

History
- Original company: Carlisle & Silloth Bay Railway & Dock Company

Key dates
- November 1856: First appeared in Bradshaw, Saturdays Only
- October 1866: Last appeared in Bradshaw
Location

New Dykes Brow was an early, short lived railway station near Fingland, Cumbria on the Carlisle & Silloth Bay Railway & Dock Company's branch from Carlisle to Silloth

The station served the small hamlet of Fingland and its rural surrounds, though its name is unclear from this distance in time.

Its timetable entries show trains calling on Saturdays only (Market Day). It only appeared in public timetables from November 1856 to October 1866.

In 1866 no evidence of the station could be seen on OS maps. It is possible that this was a "use it or lose it" stopping place where no platforms were built.

The line through the station site closed on 7 September 1964.

== History ==
The North British Railway (NBR) leased the line from the Carlisle & Silloth Bay Railway & Dock Company in 1862, and absorbed them in 1880, The NBR, in turn, was absorbed into the London and North Eastern Railway in 1923, passing to British Railways in 1948.

Preceding station	Disused railways	Following station
Drumburgh; Line and station closed	North British Railway; Carlisle & Silloth Bay Railway & Dock Company	Kirkbride; Line and station closed
