= Sleightholme railway station =

Disused railway station in Cumbria, England

Sleightholme

General information
- Location: 1 mile SW of Newton Arlosh, Cumberland; England
- Coordinates: 54.8712°N 3.2557°W
- Grid reference: NY195536
- Platforms: 1

Other information
- Status: Disused

History
- Original company: Carlisle & Silloth Bay Railway & Dock Company

Key dates
- September 1856: First appeared in Bradshaw, Saturdays Only
- June 1857: Last appeared in Bradshaw
Location

Sleightholme was an early, short lived railway station near Newton Arlosh, Cumbria on the Carlisle & Silloth Bay Railway & Dock Company's branch from Carlisle to Silloth

The station served the small hamlet of Newton Arlosh and its rural surrounds, but was named after a farm which was nearer than the village.

Its timetable entries show trains calling on Saturdays Only. It only appeared in public timetables from September 1856 to June 1857.

By 1866 no trace of the station could be seen on OS maps.

The line through the station site closed on 7 September 1964.

== History ==
The North British Railway (NBR) leased the line from the Carlisle & Silloth Bay Railway & Dock Company in 1862, and absorbed them in 1880, The NBR, in turn, was absorbed into the London and North Eastern Railway in 1923, passing to British Railways in 1948.

| Preceding station | Disused railways | Following station |
|---|---|---|
| Abbey Town; Line and station closed | North British Railway; Carlisle and Silloth Bay Railway | Abbey Junction; Line and station closed |
