= Silloth Battery Extension railway station =

Disused railway station in Cumbria, England

Silloth Battery Extension

General information
- Location: Silloth, Cumberland; England
- Coordinates: 54.8576°N 3.4013°W
- Grid reference: NY101523
- Platforms: 1

Other information
- Status: Disused

History
- Original company: Carlisle & Silloth Bay Railway & Dock Company
- Pre-grouping: North British Railway
- Post-grouping: London and North Eastern Railway

Key dates
- 1886: Opened
- About 1928: Closed
Location
- Location within the former Allerdale Borough Location within Cumbria

Silloth Battery Extension railway station was the terminus of the Blitterlees Branch, which turned southwards off the Carlisle and Silloth Bay Railway's Silloth Branch a short distance east of Silloth station. The larger railway ran from Carlisle, England. The Bitterlees Branch does not appear on standard railway maps, but it is clear on OS maps, though the station is not identifiable as such.

The station's sole purpose was to serve the naval gun testing battery, built by Armstrong Whitworth. Most trains to the site consisted of military supplies, the passenger station was built to carry battery personnel and visitors, including royalty on at least one occasion. In 1895 the Shalzada of Afghanistan and Suite observed naval firing, but was said to be especially impressed with the Maxim machine gun.

Trains to the station were run on an ad hoc basis, the station never appeared on public timetables.

The station opened in 1886 and closed in 1928 when the battery closed, its operations being moved south to Eskmeals, near Drigg.

== See also ==
- List of closed railway stations in Britain

Preceding station	Disused railways	Following station
Black Dyke Halt; Line and station closed	North British Railway; Carlisle and Silloth Bay Railway	Terminus
