= Carlisle Canal =

Former English ship canal

Coordinates: 54.9489°N 3.1852°W

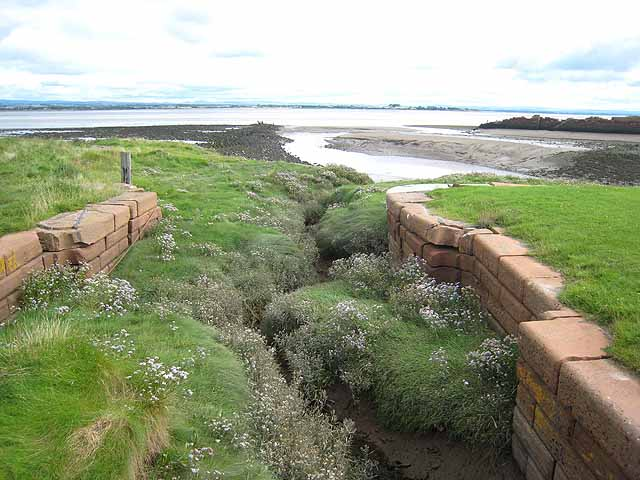
- The remains of the sea lock at Port Carlisle, where the canal joined the Solway Firth
- Interactive map of Carlisle Canal

Specifications
- Maximum boat length: 78 ft 0 in (23.77 m)
- Maximum boat beam: 18 ft 3 in (5.56 m)
- Locks: 8
- Status: replaced by railway

History
- Principal engineer: William Chapman
- Date completed: 12 March 1823
- Date closed: 1 August 1853

Geography
- Start point: Port Carlisle (formerly Fisher's Cross)
- End point: Carlisle
- Connects to: Solway Firth

The Carlisle Canal opened in 1823, linking Carlisle to the Solway Firth, to facilitate the transport of goods to and from the city. It was a short-lived venture, being replaced in 1854 by a railway which used the canal bed for most of its route.

== History ==
The River Eden flows through the city of Carlisle, and into the Solway Firth. There were coal mines at Maryport, a little further down the coast, and prior to 1720 places along the river were supplied with coal by boats. However, this trade ended in 1720, when duties were levied on all goods carried around the coast by sea, and it became cheaper to transport the coal by land. Three traders from Carlisle, John Hicks, Henry Orme and Thomas Pattinson, sought an act of Parliament which would waive the coastwise duties between Ellen Foot, as Maryport was then known, and Bank End, which was located on the river close to Carlisle. The act enabled them to build wharves, cranes and warehouses, and to dredge the river. They obtained the Eden River, Cumberland (Temporary Tolls for Improvement) Act 1721 (8 Geo. 1. c. 14) in February 1722, and could charge tolls on goods for 31 years, but there were no powers to make navigational cuts or build locks to improve the river.

On the other side of the country, there was a scheme to extend navigation on the River Tyne westwards from Newburn to Hexham, which was not actioned, but from 1794 there were various schemes to extend or bypass the River Tyne, most of which were described as being part of a coast to coast canal which might end at Carlisle or Maryport. The aspirations of the traders of Carlisle were more local, as they wanted improved facilities for ships bringing goods to Carlisle from Liverpool, Ireland, and Scottish ports. In 1795, three ships carrying around 35 tons each were regularly running between Liverpool and Sandsfield, about 3.5 miles (5.6 km) from Carlisle, from where some 1,000 tons of goods per year were carried by road to the city. In 1807, Mersey flats regularly made the journey from the River Mersey, carrying timber, and in 1818, six boats were engaged in the trade from Liverpool. Access along the river was not ideal, as the boats often had to wait in the estuary until the tide was suitable.

The idea of a canal gained support locally when a public meeting was held on 21 May 1807. The principal aim was to provide the city with a better and cheaper supply of coal, and a committee was appointed to push the plan forwards. They asked the engineer William Chapman to advise them, and he proposed a route from Carlisle to Maryport, which he had also promoted in 1795 as part of a coast to coast route. He estimated that it would cost between £90,000 and £100,000 to build, but conceded that a terminus near Bowness on the Solway Firth would be cheaper. £40,000 would pay for a canal suitable for 45-ton boats, but a larger canal, suitable for 90-ton boats that could cross the Irish Sea or reach the Forth and Clyde Canal, would cost between £55,000 and £60,000. The larger canal could still be part of a coast to coast route. The options as to the size and destination of the canal were put to subscribers by the committee. In August 1807 Chapman suggested that a ship canal for the Irish, Scottish and Liverpool trade, and a 50-ton canal to Maryport for the coal trade could both be built, with both finding support in the newspapers.

The committee sought a second opinion from Thomas Telford, who produced a report on 6 February 1808. He described a Cumberland Canal, which would allow sea-going vessels to reach Carlisle, but would also be part of a grander plan to link Carlisle to other parts of the country, and could be incorporated into the coast to coast waterway. He suggested that locks should be at least as big as those on the Forth and Clyde Canal, with a width of 20 feet (6.1 m) and a depth of water of 8 feet (2.4 m) over the lock cills. His canal would leave the Solway Firth about 1 mile (1.6 km) upstream of Bowness-on-Solway to reach Carlisle, and would cost £109,393. In order to provide a water supply, a navigable feeder would continue onwards to Wigton, which would be suitable for 7-foot (2.1 m) wide narrow boats, and would cost an additional £38,139. He also quoted two other prices for narrower canals, but noted that these would require goods to be transferred to smaller boats, with the inherent costs and inconvenience. Chapman suggested that a steam pump would be a better way to supply water, unless the Wigton route was likely to be commercially profitable, and also suggested somewhat smaller locks, at 65 feet (20 m) long, 16 feet (4.9 m) wide with 6 feet (1.8 m) of water over the cills. This would enable Mersey flats to reach Carlisle, without resorting to transhipment. However, no further progress was made at that time.

Carlisle Canal Act 1819
- Act of Parliament
- Parliament of the United Kingdom
- Long title: An Act for making and maintaining a Navigable Canal from or from near the City of Carlisle, to the Solway Frith, at or near Fisher's Cross, in the Parish of Bowness, in the County of Cumberland.
- Citation: 59 Geo. 3. c. xiii

Dates
- Royal assent: 6 April 1819

Other legislation
- Repealed by: Port Carlisle Dock and Railway Act 1853

Status: Repealed

Text of statute as originally enacted

After eight and a half years, another meeting was held at Carlisle on 7 October 1817, and Chapman was asked to produce a survey for a canal suitable for vessels of at least 70 tons. He was to ensure that it could become part of the coast to coast link. His canal started at Fisher's Cross, subsequently named Port Carlisle, although this name had also been applied to Sandsfield in earlier days. It would feature locks 74 by 17 feet (22.6 by 5.2 m), while the channel would be 50 feet (15 m) wide by 8 feet (2.4 m) deep, and would cost £75,392. A link to Newcastle upon Tyne could be built on a smaller scale, and another link could be built along the valley of the Eden to serve slate quarries near Ullswater. His plan was accepted, money was raised locally, and the Carlisle Canal Act 1819 (59 Geo. 3. c. xiii) was obtained, which authorised the Carlisle Canal to raise £80,000 in capital, and an extra £40,000 if required. The chairman of the committee, Dr John Heysham, suggested they look at other canals before starting work, and visits were made to the Lancaster Canal and the Forth and Clyde Canael.

=== Construction ===
The committee appointed Chapman as consulting engineer, but who held the position of resident engineer is less clear. Richard Buck had helped Chapman with the initial surveys, and it appears that his brother Henry fulfilled that role at the start of the project. Contracts to build the entire canal had been awarded by early 1820, but relationships between Chapman, Buck and the committee were not good, and the committee asked Thomas Ferrier from the Forth and Clyde Canal to oversee the works in March. Buck was not happy with this and resigned in July. but Richard Buck stayed on, effectively working for Ferrier. Chapman was not happy with this situation, and in November 1822, when most of the work had been completed, criticised Ferrier's workmanship, and recommended that Buck should be allowed to complete the canal. The committee took exception to this and dismissed him. Two months later, just before the canal was due to open, they dismissed Buck as well, although he did not leave and stayed on until May 1823.

The canal was 11.25 miles (18.11 km) long, had a surface width of 54 feet (16 m) and was 8 feet (2.4 m) deep. At Fisher's Cross, a basin 250 by 80 feet (76 by 24 m) had been built, which was connected to the Solway Firth by a sea lock with a long timber jetty. Seven more locks raised the level of the canal by 46 feet (14 m), and at Carlisle there was a second basin, 450 by 100 feet (137 by 30 m), complete with wharves and a warehouse. The locks were 78 feet (24 m) long and 18.5 feet (5.6 m) wide, and water supply was provided by a reservoir on Mill Beck near Grinsdale. The sea lock was built so that its top was at the same level as high tides on the lowest neap tides, and there was a second lock nearby, which maintained the level of the canal at 6 inches (15 cm) above the level of the highest tides. Beyond the two locks, the canal ran on a level for 6 miles (9.7 km), and then the remaining six locks were grouped together in the next 1.25 miles (2.01 km), after which the canal ran level again to reach Carlisle. Facilities at Carlisle were improved in 1838 by the construction of a timber pond below the basin. There were no fixed bridges on the route, so that it could be used by coastal vessels, and where crossings were required, they were built using two-leaved drawbridges, similar in style to those on the Forth and Clyde Canal.

While Paget-Tomlinson and Hadfield & Biddle agree on the number of locks, Priestley, writing in 1831, suggests that there were two locks immediately above the sea lock, each with a rise of 8 feet (2.4 m), and that the top level was 15.5 feet (4.7 m) above the level of the sea lock, this being the level reached by an abnormally high tide which was recorded in January 1796. He also says that there were two basins between the locks, known as the Upper and Lower Solway basins, and that the six locks further along raised the level by 46 feet (14 m).

The committee had succeeded in raising £70,600 of the authorised capital, most of it coming from local people. To complete the project, they had borrowed around £10,000, so the total cost was just over the estimated £80,000. The committee consisted of nine proprietors, each of whom was required to hold at least ten shares, and they were to be elected annually.

=== Operation ===
The committee set about encouraging trade on the canal, and built a timber yard at Carlisle. Shortly afterwards, the Treasury altered the rules on coastal taxes, and repealed the duties on coal, stone and slate carried between Whitehaven and Carlisle. However, no one could be found to run a trade in coal, so in June the committee sent a boat called Mary to Harrington to fetch some, which they then sold, but decided not to run the coal trade directly. Towing of boats on the canal was organised by a group of men called Trackers, and by the end of the year tolls of £928 had been collected. In 1824, they kick-started a trade in bricks, by importing two boat loads, which they sold from the quays at Carlisle. Suspecting that the reservoir might not be adequate for the number of boats using the canal, they built a feeder from the river, with a water wheel to raise the water to the level of the canal. There were attempts to avoid the tolls on the canal, with some ships carrying timber waiting for favourable tides, and using the river to reach Rockcliffe, where the timber was loaded into carts.

In 1825 the Carlisle & Liverpool Steam Navigation Company were looking to start a passenger service from Liverpool, and asked for an exclusive berth for their ship. The committee paid for a new berth, the cost to be repaid by the Navigation Company over the next ten years, and also bought a second-hand packet boat called Bailie Nicol Jarvie, to ferry the passengers from Port Carlisle to Carlisle. They leased it to a local innkeeper, Alexander Cockburn, for £30 per year, and the service began on 1 July 1826. The steamer service to Liverpool began at about the same time, although the packet boat only ran in the summer months to begin with. As well as passengers, the steamer also carried goods, and these were carried along the canal by lighters. The Solway Hotel opened in Port Carlisle soon afterwards.

In August 1824, there were public meetings in Newcastle, to consider again the idea of a canal to Carlisle, or possibly a railway. William Chapman, who had surveyed a route for a canal in 1796, suggested that the route was also suitable for a railway, and was asked to cost both options. He quoted £888,000 for a canal and £252,488 for a railway. A company was created to build a railway, although they did not obtain the Newcastle-upon-Tyne and Carlisle Railway Act 1829 (10 Geo. 4. c. lxxii) until a couple more years had past. There was support in Carlisle, and an agreement was reached that the railway would terminate at the canal basin. It opened in stages from 19 July 1836, reaching Redheugh, Gateshead on 18 June 1838, and Newcastle the following year. Through traffic boosted the profits of the canal. Tolls had averaged £2,905 for the three years to 1835, but by 1840, they had reached £6,605. Receipts from the packet boat had also climbed steadily, to £829 in 1850, and the company had been able to pay dividends to shareholders, starting at 1 per cent in 1833, and rising to 4 per cent by 1839.

Further progress was made. In early 1832, several shipowners had placed buoys in the Solway Firth, to mark the channel, and started collecting funds from ships to cover their costs. They asked the canal company to take over responsibility for this, and they did so. In 1833, the Carlisle and Annan Navigation Company asked for a berth at Port Carlisle for their new service to Annan and Liverpool, and one was built. With arrival of the railway imminent, the committee asked William Houston, of the Glasgow, Paisley and Ardrossan Canal to arrange the construction of a faster packet boat, and the Arrow entered service in 1834. The company purchased an ice-breaker, which enabled the packet service to run all year from the winter of 1836-37. The old packet boat, Bailie Nicol Jarvie, was sold for £7 12 shillings (£7.60), and the company also started an omnibus service between Carlisle basin and the town centre.

Port Carlisle Dock Act 1836
- Act of Parliament
- Parliament of the United Kingdom
- Long title: An Act to enable the Carlisle Canal Company to make a Dock or Docks at Port Carlisle otherwise Fishers Cross, and for amending and enlarging the Powers and Provisions of the Act for making and maintaining the said Canal.
- Citation: 6 & 7 Will. 4. c. lx

Dates
- Royal assent: 7 June 1836

Other legislation
- Repealed by: Port Carlisle Dock and Railway Act 1853

Status: Repealed

Text of statute as originally enacted

To improve the water supply, William Fairbairn was paid £1,391 to construct a new waterwheel and pumps, and these were commissioned in 1835. However, they pumps did not work as well as anticipated, and Harvey's of Hoyle provided a 60-inch (150 cm) steam engine and pumps in 1838, at a cost of £3,700. These supplemented the waterwheel, being used when river levels were too low to drive it, or when the reservoir needed filling. The Admiralty surveyed the Solway Firth in 1835, and were asked for advice on buoys to mark the channel. The berths at Port Carlisle were dredged, and plans for an inner and outer dock were formulated. John Hartley of Liverpool had produced designs by November 1835, and an act of Parliament, the Port Carlisle Dock Act 1836 (6 & 7 Will. 4. c. lx), was obtained. It allowed the company to borrow another £40,000, and included powers to light and buoy the Solway Firth. Hartley's plans to start enclosing the dock area in June 1836 were delayed due to objections from Lord Lonsdale, who had rights over the foreshore, but work eventually started in August 1838. The purchase of eighteen new buoys was begun in May 1837, and they were installed during 1838. A lightship was built in 1840, and a lighthouse was constructed at Lees Scar near Silloth.

=== Railways ===
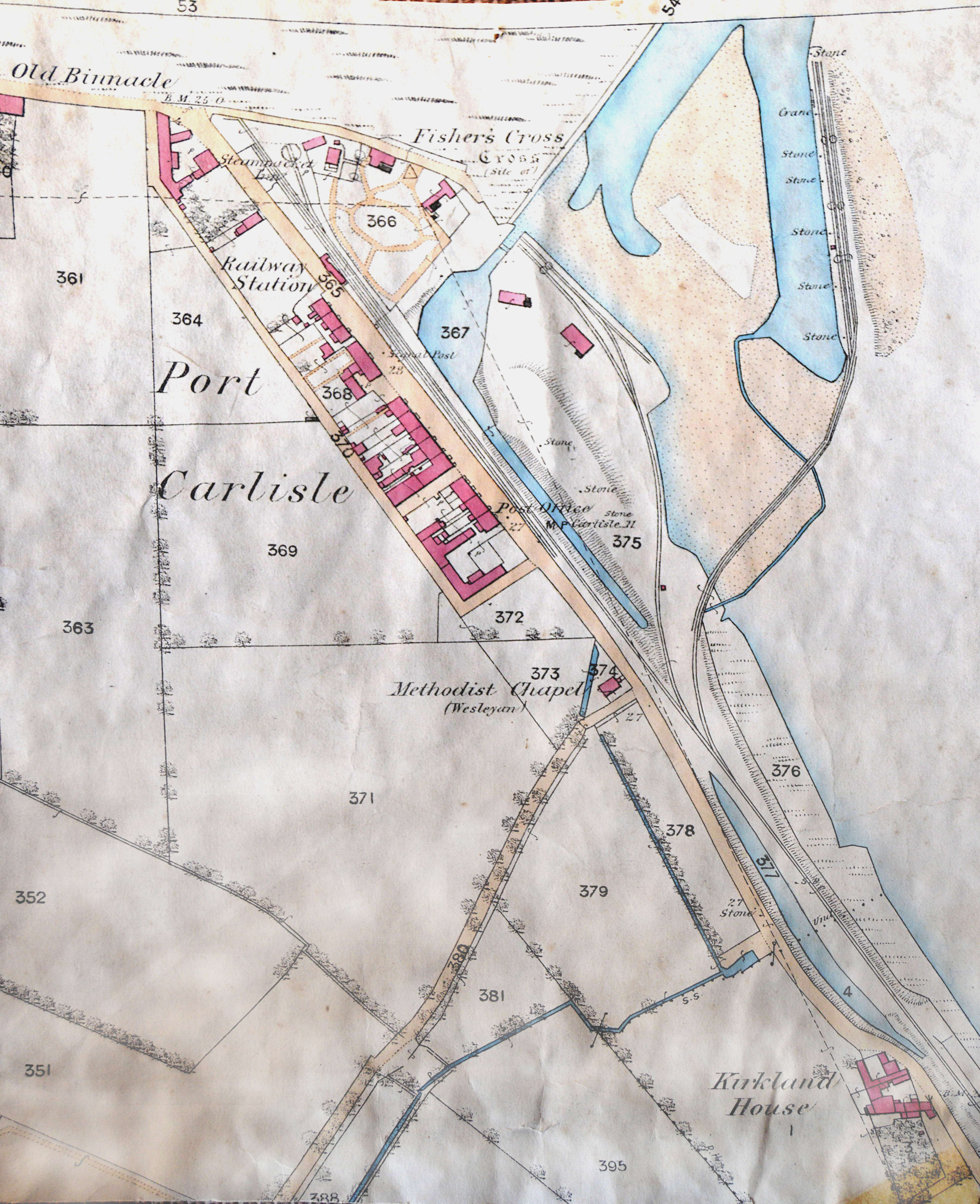
Map of Port Carlisle, after 1854, showing the infilled canal and new railway

Traffic on the canal increased with the arrival of the railway at Carlisle basin. This included coal from Lord Carlisle's mines, and also from the Blenkinsopp Coal Company, who were based at Greenhead. The company decided to carry coal in barges, which were towed by a tug when operating on the Solway Firth, although they had initially considered using boats or rafts onto which the loaded railway wagons would be shunted. A second packet boat was obtained from Paisley in July 1838, and tolls on the canal and railway were reduced in 1838 and 1839, to encourage through traffic. The increase in traffic was sufficient that the men who worked as bridge and lock keepers were paid extra amounts in view of their increased workload. An intermittent traffic was carrying railway locomotives, notably ones built in Newcastle destined to be exported to the USA and some destined for the new Liverpool and Manchester Railway. Stephenson's Rocket was a pioneer made famous at the Rainhill Trials, but by 1837 it had been overtaken by more powerful designs. It was moved to the Brampton Railway near Carlisle to end its career in colliery use. Its journey to Brampton included being shipped from Liverpool then along the Carlisle Canal.

However, the boom did not last long, and the company found that it was in competition with the railways. The Lancaster and Carlisle Railway was authorised in 1844, and was a direct threat to the steamer service and canal. The Maryport and Carlisle Railway had been authorised in 1837, but its opening was delayed until 1845 by financial difficulties. It was extended to Whitehaven in early 1847 by the opening of the Whitehaven Junction Railway, and at the end of the year the Lancaster and Carlisle Railway opened. The Caledonian Railway opened in February 1848, running northwards from Carlisle to Scotland.

By the autumn of 1846, the company was seriously considering converting the canal into a railway, and commissioned a report, which was produced in February 1847, and suggested the idea was feasible. They entertained the directors of the Newcastle and Carlisle Railway in May, and in July were instructed by the shareholders to begin negotiations with that company, or another of the railway companies with lines to Carlisle. Little progress was made, and the canal company and steamboat companies looked at ways to reduce costs, and thus lower their tolls. Despite the sale of the packet boat Clarence in 1847, and the withdrawal of the steamer service from Port Carlisle to Annan, passenger traffic remained good, but in April 1850 was affected by the introduction of cheaper fares to Liverpool, using the railway from Carlisle to Whitehaven, and a much shorter sea voyage from there to Liverpool. In March 1852 the company decided that the best option was to convert the canal into a railway, raised some money from shareholders and loan holders, and sought an act of Parliament. Work began in June 1853, although the Port Carlisle Dock and Railway Act 1853 (16 & 17 Vict. c. cxix) was not obtained until 3 August. An omnibus service was used to ferry passengers between Carlisle and the steamers at Port Carlisle, and the canal closed on 1 August 1853.

The Port Carlisle Dock and Railway Act 1853 wound up the canal company, and created the Port Carlisle Dock and Railway Company. In less than a year, construction was completed, with the line opening for goods traffic on 12 May 1854. Passenger services followed on 22 June. A second act of Parliament, the Carlisle and Silloth Bay Railway and Dock Act 1855 (18 & 19 Vict. c. cliii) authorised the Carlisle and Silloth Bay Railway and Dock Company, with a working capital of £165,000. Their railway left the Port Carlisle line at Drumburgh and ran to Silloth, where a dock to rival Maryport was constructed. The North British Railway leased both lines in 1862, and they all merged in 1880. The stub from Drumburgh to Port Carlisle became known as the Port Carlisle Branch, and lasted until 1 June 1932, when it closed.

== Bibliography ==
- Hadfield, Charles; Biddle, Gordon (1970). The Canals of North West England, Vol 2 (pp.241-496). David and Charles. ISBN 978-0-7153-4992-2.
- Paget-Tomlinson, Edward (2006). Canal and River Navigations. Landmark Publishing. ISBN 978-1-84306-207-3.
- Perriam, Denis (May 2021). Peascod, Michael (ed.). "Locomotives Shipped along Carlisle Canal". Cumbrian Railways. 13 (10). Pinner: Cumbrian Railways Association. ISSN 1466-6812. 178.
- Priestley, Joseph (1831). "Historical Account of the Navigable Rivers, Canals and Railways of Great Britain". Archived from the original on 7 March 2016.
- Skempton, Sir Alec; et al. (2002). A Biographical Dictionary of Civil Engineers in Great Britain and Ireland: Vol 1: 1500 to 1830. Thomas Telford. ISBN 978-0-7277-2939-2.
