= Abbey Junction railway station =

Disused railway station in Cumbria, England

Coordinates: 54°51′8.8″N 3°16′42.8″W

Abbey Junction
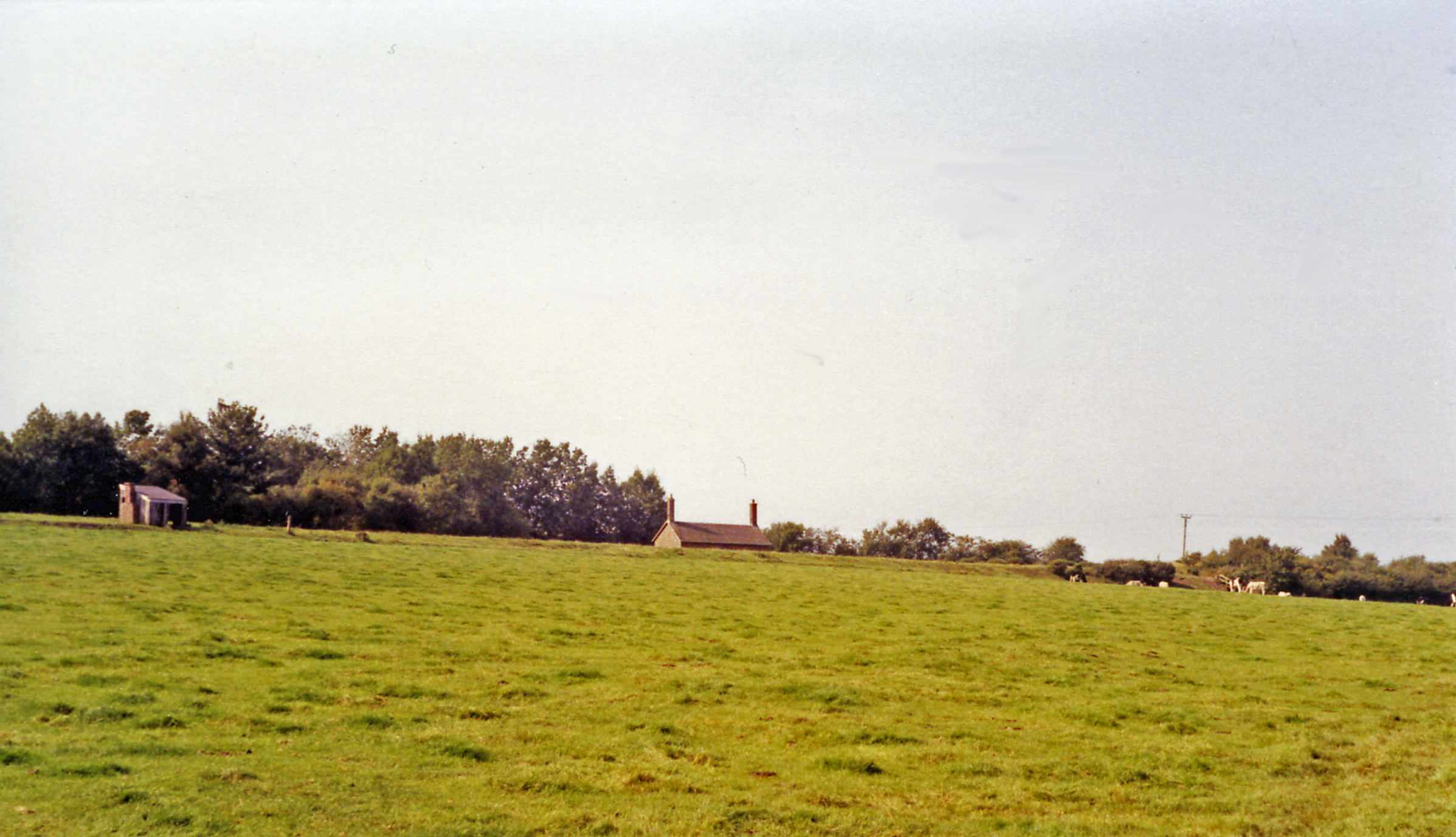
- The station site years after closure

General information
- Location: Abbey Town, Cumberland; England
- Platforms: ?

Other information
- Status: Disused

History
- Opened: 1856
- Original company: Solway Junction Railway
- Pre-grouping: Caledonian Railway

Key dates
- 1856: Station opened as Abbeyholme
- 31 August 1870: Station opened as Abbey Junction
- 1 January 1917: Closed
- 2 March 1919: Reopened
- 1 September 1921: Closed
Location

Abbey Junction railway station was the railway junction where the branch line to Silloth on the Solway Firth divided from the Solway Junction Railway in the English county of Cumberland (later Cumbria).

== History ==
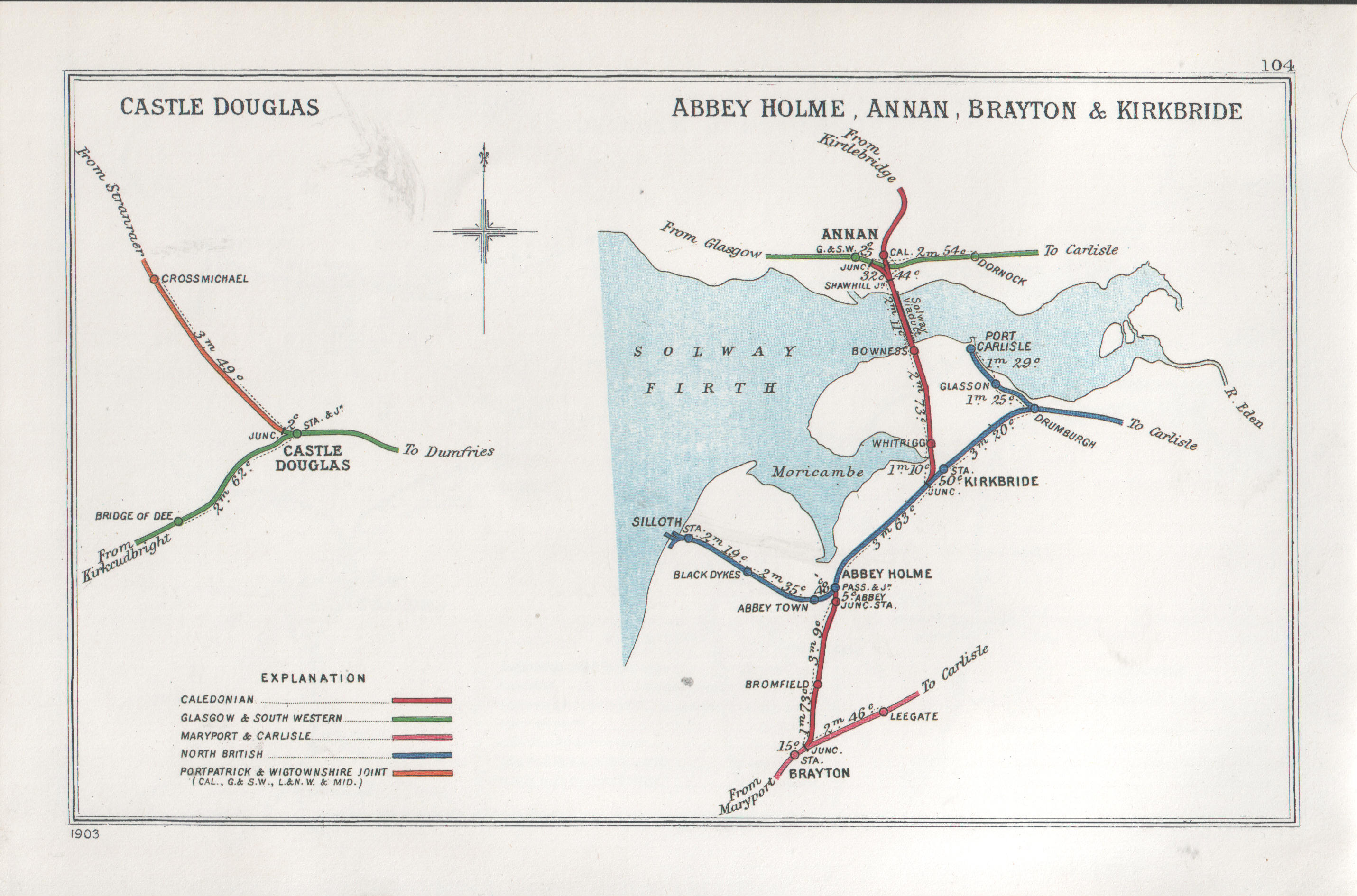
A 1903 Railway Clearing House Junction Diagram showing (right) railways in the vicinity of Abbey Junction

A station on the site was opened as Abbeyholme by the Carlisle and Silloth Bay Railway in 1856, and was then renamed Abbey Junction by the North British Railway in 1870. It closed in 1921.

A parallel station on the site was opened as Abbey Junction by the Maryport and Carlisle Railway. It closed briefly from 1917 to 1919 then permanently in 1921.

The closure of the stations was linked to the closure of the Solway viaduct.

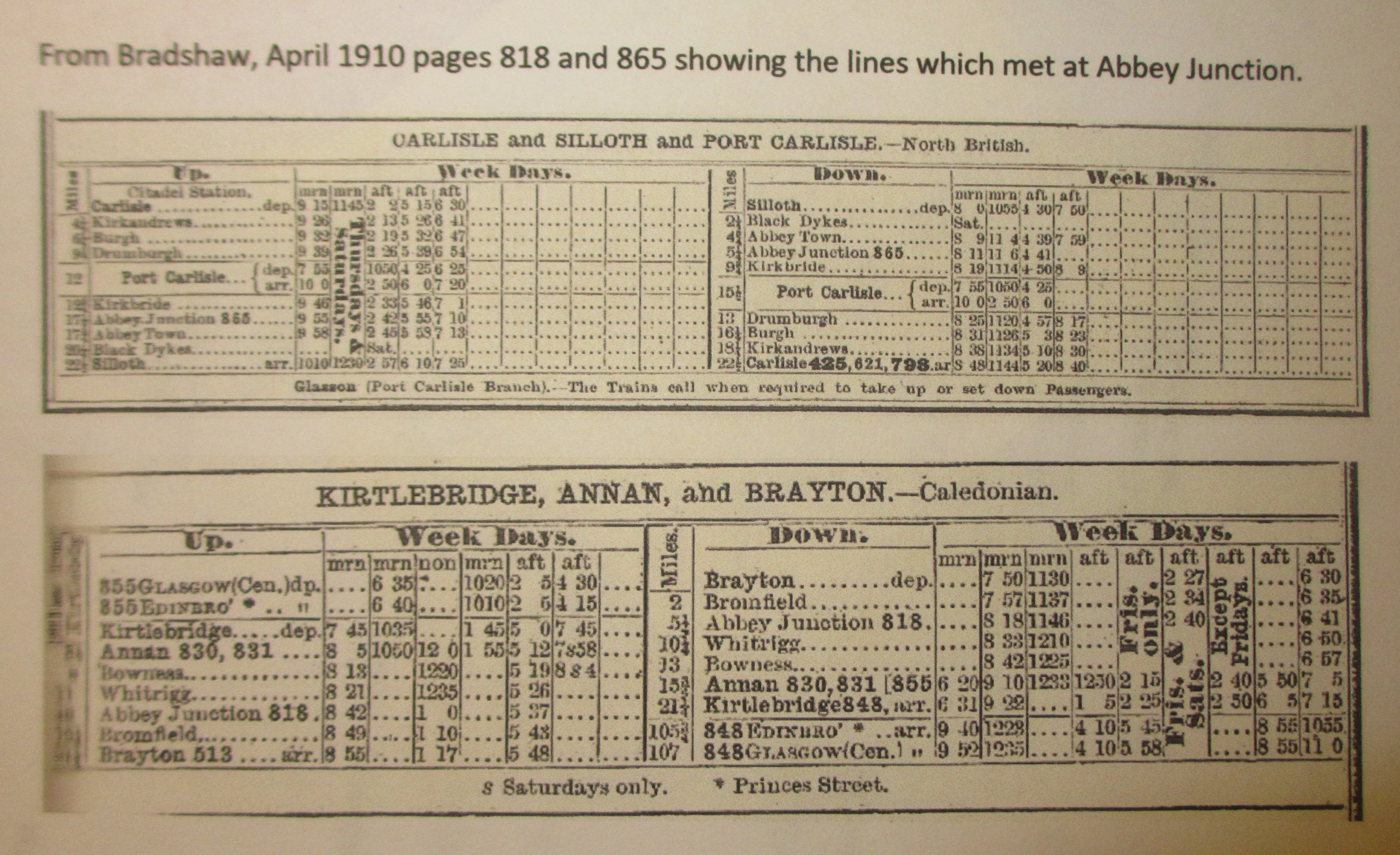
Extracts from Bradshaw's Guide, April 1910 showing the two lines which crossed at Abbey Junction, Cumberland

== Sources ==
- Butt, R. V. J. (October 1995). The Directory of Railway Stations: details every public and private passenger station, halt, platform and stopping place, past and present (1st ed.). Sparkford: Patrick Stephens Ltd. ISBN 978-1-85260-508-7. OCLC 60251199. OL 11956311M.
- Jowett, A. (2000). Jowett's Nationalised Railway Atlas. Atlantic Publishing. ISBN 0-906899-99-0.
- Robinson, Peter W. (2002). Cumbria's Lost Railways. Catrine: Stenlake Publishing. ISBN 978-1-84033-205-6.

Preceding station	Disused railways	Following station
Sleightholme; Line and station closed	North British Railway; Carlisle and Silloth Bay Railway	Kirkbride; Line and station closed
Whitrigg; Line and station closed	Caledonian Railway; Solway Junction Railway	Bromfield; Line and station closed
