= Cumberland and Westmorland Convalescent Institution railway station =

Disused railway station in Cumbria, England

Cumberland and Westmorland Convalescent Institution
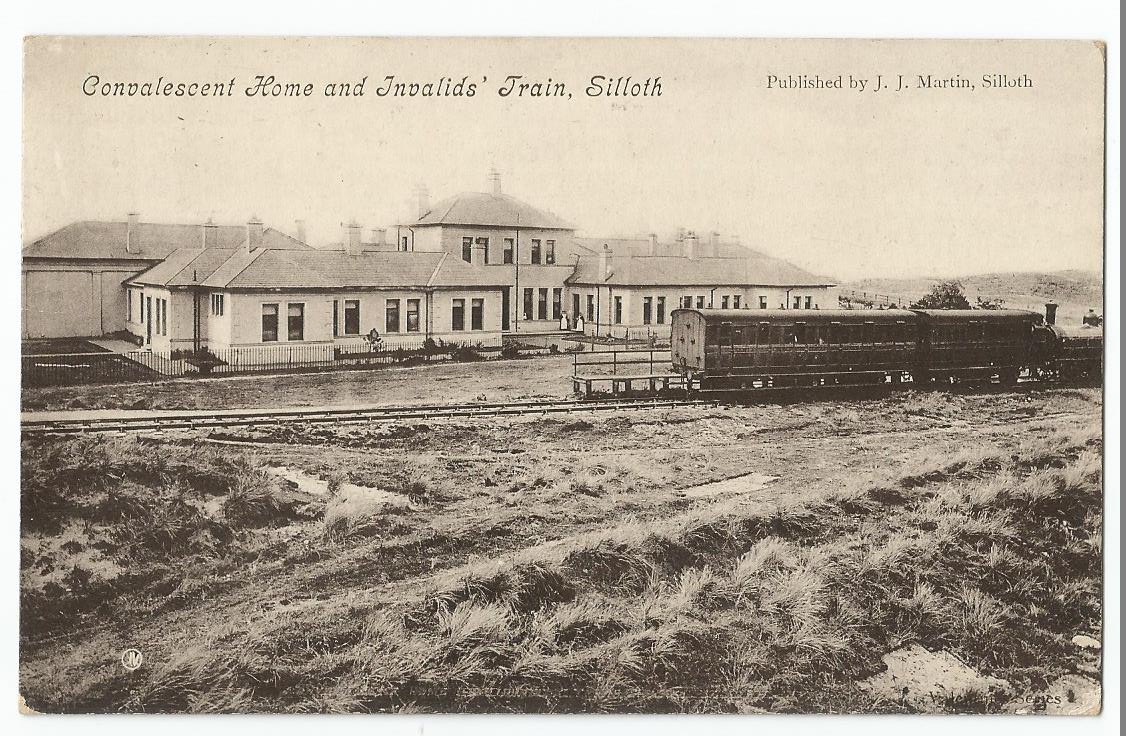
- The station with a typical train, around the beginning of the 20th century

General information
- Location: Silloth, Cumberland; England
- Coordinates: 54.8651°N 3.3967°W
- Grid reference: NY104531
- Platforms: 1

Other information
- Status: Disused

History
- Original company: Carlisle & Silloth Bay Railway & Dock Company
- Pre-grouping: North British Railway
- Post-grouping: London and North Eastern Railway

Key dates
- 1862: Opened
- Unclear, either about 1928 or after 1937: Closed
Location
- Location within the former Allerdale Borough Location within Cumbria

Cumberland and Westmorland Convalescent Institution railway station was a terminus off the short Blitterlees Branch off the Carlisle and Silloth Bay Railway, within Silloth itself. The larger railway ran from Carlisle, England. The station does not appear on standard railway maps, but it can be discerned with a magnifying glass on at least two published maps and clearest of all on the 1914 25" OS map.

The station's sole purpose was to serve the convalescent home of the same name. Although this was the home's formal title, it was widely referred to as "Silloth Convalescent Home", as was the station. The station never appeared in public timetables.

"Invalid Trains" to the station were run on an ad hoc basis, though for many years they commonly ran on Thursdays around 15:00, preceded by a shunter or a guard on foot, as the line to the station was a siding without signals or fencing.

The unstaffed station was minimalist, consisting of a single wooden platform next to the single track.

The home and station opened in 1862. One source states that the station is believed to have closed around 1928, whilst another, with local knowledge, refers to it as both mentioned in the 1937 Sectional Appendix and "open during the Second World War". In 2015 the home was still operating.

== See also ==
- List of closed railway stations in Britain

Preceding station	Disused railways	Following station
Black Dyke Halt; Line and station closed	North British Railway; Carlisle and Silloth Bay Railway	Terminus
