= Black Dyke Halt railway station =

Disused railway station in Cumbria, England

Black Dyke Halt
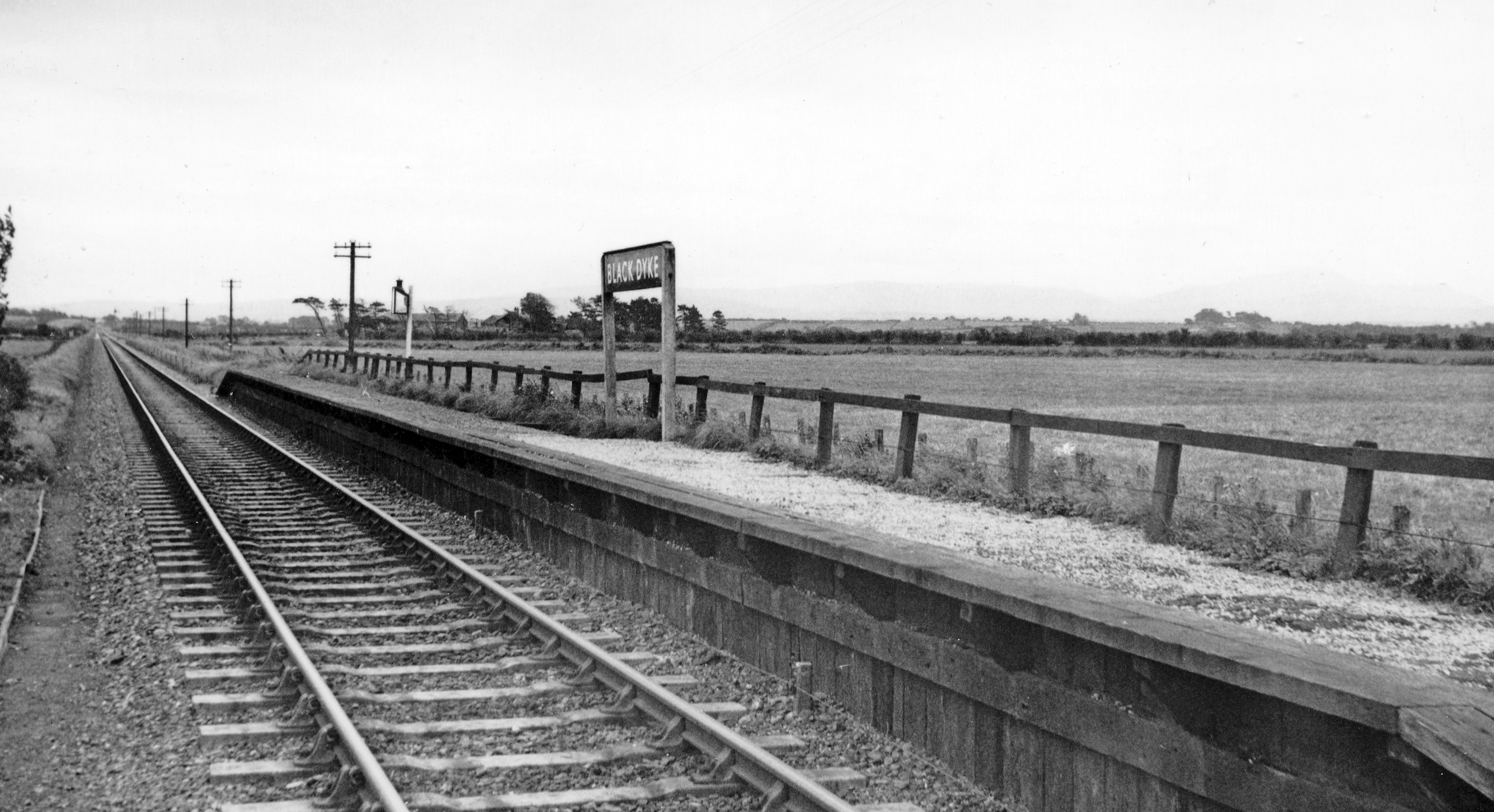
- Black Dyke Halt

General information
- Location: Blackdyke, Cumberland; England
- Coordinates: 54.8556°N 3.3408°W
- Grid reference: NY139520
- Platforms: 1

Other information
- Status: Disused

History
- Original company: Carlisle & Silloth Bay Railway & Dock Company
- Pre-grouping: North British Railway
- Post-grouping: London and North Eastern Railway

Key dates
- 22 August 1856: Opened
- 7 September 1964: Closed
Location

Black Dyke Halt or Blackdyke was a railway station near Blackdyke, Cumbria on the Silloth branch, serving the small hamlet of Black Dyke and its rural district. In its early days trains called on Saturdays only (Market Day), being upgraded some years later. The station closed on 7 September 1964. with the line to Silloth as part of the Beeching cuts.

== History ==
The North British Railway leased the line from 1862, it was absorbed by them in 1880, and then taken over by the London and North Eastern Railway in 1923. The halt then passed on to the London Midland Region of British Railways on nationalisation in 1948. The platform has been demolished.

=== Infrastructure ===
The halt sat close to the hamlet and had a single wood fronted platform with no platform shelter. Light was provided by two lamps. Level crossing gates were located at the platform end and a passenger shelter, or crossing keepers shelter, was located here. The stop lay about two miles away from Silloth and three from Abbey Town railway station by train. It became a request stop in the 1950s.

Preceding station	Disused railways	Following station
Abbey Town; Line and station closed	North British Railway; Carlisle and Silloth Bay Railway	Causewayhead; Line and station closed
