= Silloth railway station =

Disused railway station in Cumbria, England

Silloth
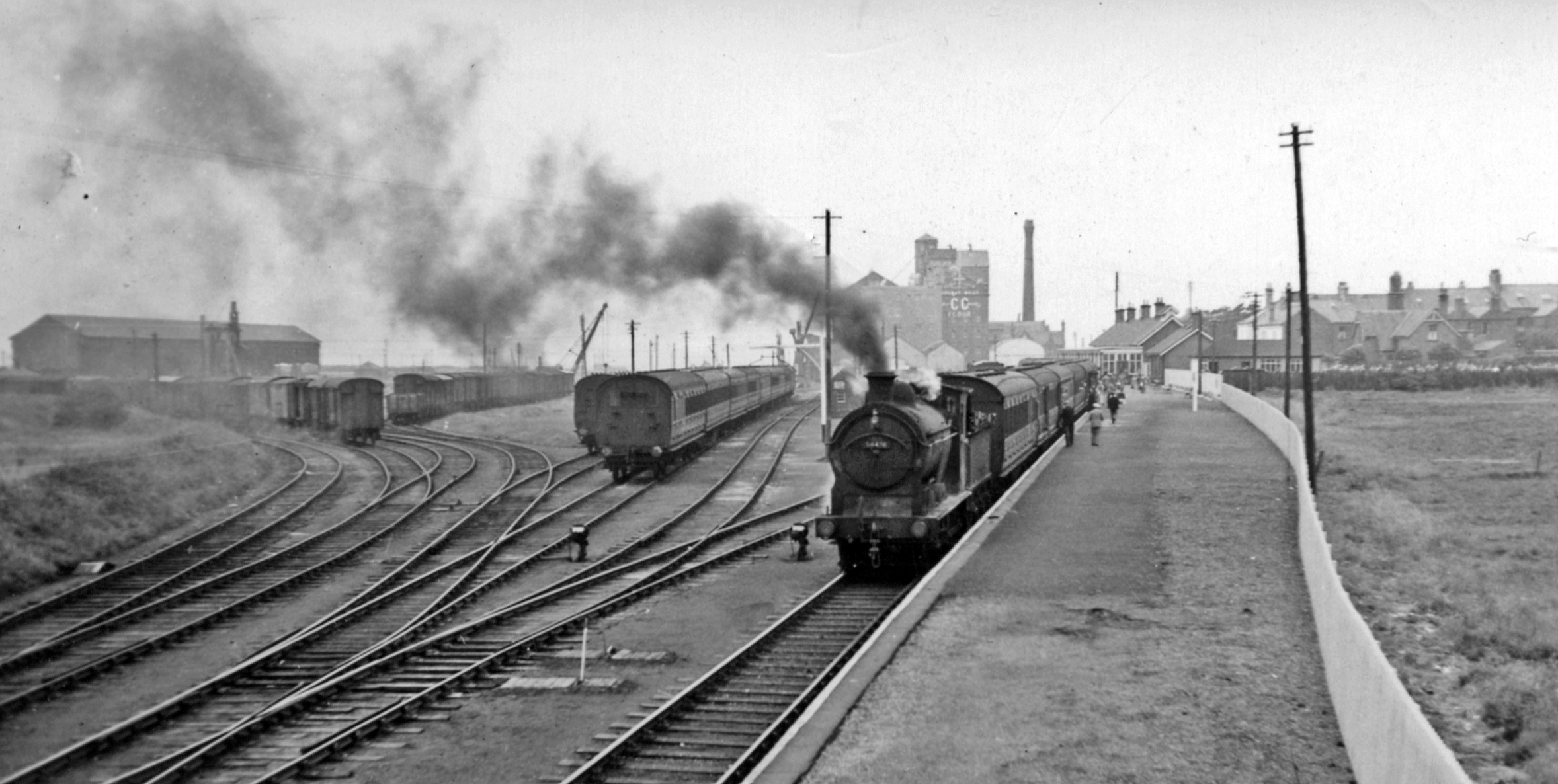
- Silloth station, 1951

General information
- Location: Silloth, Cumberland; England
- Coordinates: 54.8676°N 3.3893°W
- Grid reference: NY109534
- Platforms: 1

Other information
- Status: Disused

History
- Original company: Carlisle & Silloth Bay Railway & Dock Company
- Pre-grouping: North British Railway
- Post-grouping: London and North Eastern Railway

Key dates
- 4 September 1856: Opened
- 7 September 1964: Closed
Location
- Location within the former Allerdale Borough Location within Cumbria

Silloth was the terminus of the Carlisle and Silloth Bay Railway, a branch railway from Carlisle, England. The town, dock and station at Silloth were built on a greenfield site after the Carlisle & Silloth Bay Railway & Dock Act (1855) was passed. The railway provision grew with the dock and its later additions.

The station was opened in 1856 and closed by the Beeching axe on 7 September 1964, when it had been estimated in 1962 that the line was losing £23,500 a year and rising, staff costs had been pared to the bone and an imminent track bill of £32,500 was to be faced.

== Services ==
Sample timetables along the branch show typical routine patterns. Unfortunately they are undated:

- the first does not show Abbey Junction, suggesting it is after 1 September 1921, nor does it mention the North British, so it may be 1923–1932, when the branch to Port Carlisle closed
- the second matches Bradshaw in 1922
- the third is from British Railways days.

The Winter 1962–3 timetable shows eight trains each way, Monday to Saturday, with a Saturday extra, as well as three trains on Sundays. The table strikes the eye as being simpler than earlier timetables with:

- all trains 2nd Class only
- a much better service to Blackdyke Halt
- no through trains beyond Carlisle
- Drumburgh had closed in 1955.

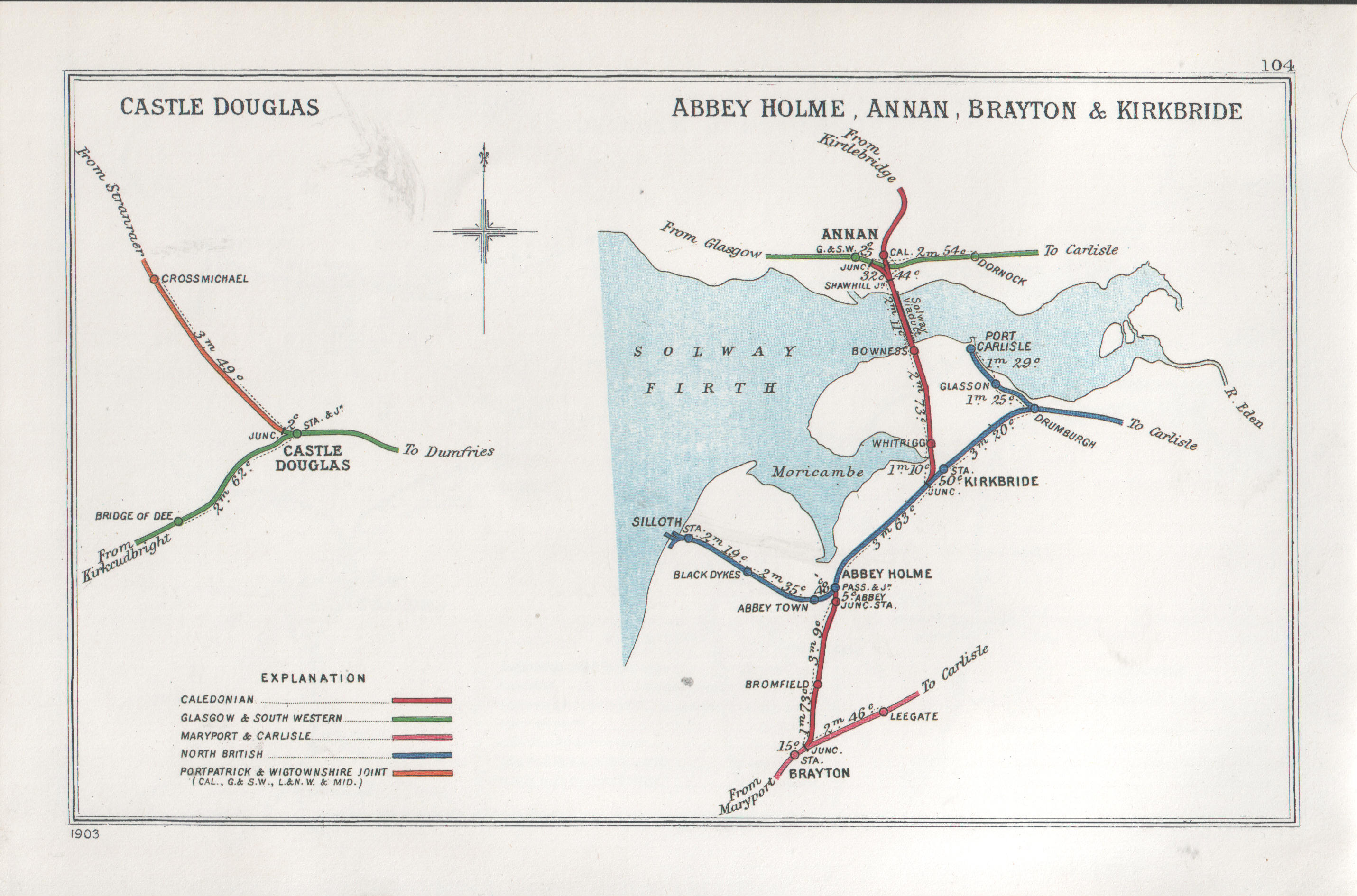
A 1903 Railway Clearing House Junction Diagram showing (right) railways in the vicinity of Silloth

The line was one of the first in the country to be dieselised, with one train a day remaining steam-hauled.

The branch was atypical in that from the 1880s successive owners had fostered a vigorous trade in "Specials", the cornerstone of which was Carlisle to Silloth and back for a shilling. This was backed by encouraging outings to Silloth by a wide range of customers such as Sunday schools, Temperance clubs and racegoers. Many specials were both long and well-filled; the longest ever was not a trippers' train, but a celebration train for the reopening of Carr's flour mill in 1905.

Freight traffic, which had done well in wartime, notably because it was on the north west coast, was following the pattern of the rest of the country – in decline. Four camping coaches were positioned here by the London Midland Region from 1956 to 1964. There was insufficient shunting to justify keeping the small locoshed open after 6 July 1953 and erstwhile staple business such as flour traffic from Carr's Mill fell from £7000 to £100 per month, the business being lost to road competition.

All tracks to and in Silloth had been removed by 1968.

== Redevelopment ==
The Allerdale council in northern England passed its final approval on a plan to demolish the remaining structure of the station on 8 December 2006. The development firm James Morgan Ltd. was awarded a contract to build new single-family housing on the property. Stuart Hinchliffe, director of the development firm also stated "We will be reinstating as much of the old railway platform as we can, to maintain Silloth's Victorian history."

== See also ==
- List of closed railway stations in Britain

Preceding station	Disused railways	Following station
Causewayhead; Line and station closed	North British Railway; Carlisle and Silloth Bay Railway	Terminus
