= Carlisle and Silloth Bay Railway =

UK railway company

There were two interlinked railways on the south shore of the Solway Firth.

The Port Carlisle Dock and Railway Company was opened in 1854, following the route of a former canal, intended to connect Port Carlisle, to which sea-going ships could navigate, with the city of Carlisle. The Carlisle and Silloth Bay Railway and Dock Company was built as an extension of the Port Carlisle line, opening in 1856, because silting of the Solway was making Port Carlisle unusable. (Note: The above titles are those used in official documents; other names were used informally.)

The two railways operated collaboratively, but neither was successful financially and insolvency seemed inevitable. However the North British Railway (NBR) was building the line that became the Waverley Route from Edinburgh to Carlisle. The established railways at Carlisle obstructed the NBR's intended access, so the NBR leased the Port Carlisle and the Silloth companies, and connected with them at the Port Carlisle's station in Carlisle. The NBR sent goods traffic for English destinations on to Silloth and by coastal shipping from there, by-passing the competing companies' obstruction. Irish and other destinations were served as well, and the maritime trade developed well. The NBR also improved Silloth as a holiday resort, and it became popular.

However, from 1879 the NBR made an alliance with the Midland Railway and traffic to England over that line became dominant, and Port Carlisle and Silloth were no longer of strategic value. Local traffic other than the seasonal holiday trade was insignificant and decline was inevitable. the Port Carlisle line closed to passenger traffic in 1932 and the entire network closed in 1964.

The Port Carlisle branch from Drumburgh was notable because passenger trains were operated by a horse-drawn vehicle, lasting until 1914.

== History ==
=== The Carlisle Canal ===
==== Construction and early years ====
The city of Carlisle is located on the River Eden, which enters the Solway Firth about five miles north-west at Sandsfield. The river is not navigable, and the upper Solway is largely sandbanks, but the Eden gives a navigable channel which lies close to the English shore from Sandsfield almost to Bowness-on-Solway. The valley of the River Irthing, a tributary of the Eden, gives a low-level route via the Tyne Gap to the valley of the South Tyne and Carlisle thus stands at an important point for both north–south and east–west communications. The earliest proposals for an improved link from Carlisle to the sea were as part of a bigger project: a canal linking Newcastle-upon-Tyne with the Irish Sea proposed in the 1790s. This was originally intended to enter the sea at Sandsfield, but Maryport was later chosen as the planned western terminus in order to avoid the difficulties of navigation in the upper Solway.

The Newcastle–Maryport canal project was abandoned in 1797, and when talk of a canal was revived in 1807, it was a Carlisle-led project aimed at giving cheaper transport of raw materials into Carlisle (although the profitable possibility of the canal forming part of a Newcastle-Irish Sea link was never entirely forgotten). The project lapsed, but was revived in 1817 when lack of cheap water transport was thought to be stifling the development of industry in the city; a number of cotton mills had been established in Carlisle, (Note: The manufacture of silk-cotton ginghams was a speciality of the city; as late as the 1840s petitions for the repeal of duties on raw cotton got signatures from twelve different Carlisle cotton firms) and the owner of the biggest of these reported in 1817 that he was spending £10,000 a year on land transport (and hoped that a canal would halve his transport costs). By August 1818, the inhabitants of Carlisle had subscribed for £30,000 of shares; Lord Lonsdale observed that this was done more for the general benefit than for private gain (although it was predicted that the canal would be profitable). The promoters (amongst whom Carlisle's two MPs were prominent) had decided that – even if cost of construction were no object – Fisher's Cross (on the Solway just short of Bowness) was preferable to Maryport as the western terminus of the canal. The inhabitants of Wigton had urged instead the claims of a canal passing Wigton and ending at Silloth Bay 'a point of SOLWAY FIRTH, to which Vessels of very considerable Burthen can have Access at all Times, and Anchor in Safety' but this option was not pursued. Thomas Telford had been consulted in 1808 and concurred with the choice of Fisher's Cross as the western terminus: 'The shore is here well calculated for an entrance, and the general form of the shores of the Frith promises to keep this point always clear'

The canal company's act of Parliament, the Carlisle Canal Act 1819 (59 Geo. 3. c. xiii), was passed in April 1819, and on 12 March 1823 the finished canal opened. It was 11¼ miles long, running from a basin in Carlisle to the Solway Firth at Fisher's Cross, which was renamed Port Carlisle. The depth of water in the canal was 2.6 metres (8 ft 6inches, and at the entrance from the Solway there was 2.75 metres, 9 ft of water, even at neap low tides). A contemporary map shows the course of the canal, with six locks along it; these were 5.7 metres (18 ft 8inches) wide and 22.1 metres (72 ft 6inches) long: and sea-going vessels of up to 100 tons could use the canal to reach Carlisle. Whereas the promoters had projected 70,000 tons a year of merchandise to pass along the canal, and this to generate just under £8,000 annual revenue, about 13,000 tons of merchandise passed along the canal in its first year of operation, generating about £1400 revenue: furthermore it became evident that modifications were needed and £6,000 would have to be borrowed to pay for them. The design of the sea entrance was then found to be defective, and expensive remedial work necessary; by 1826 the company's borrowings were £23,000, and the shareholders authorised the borrowing of another £12,000.

==== The railways reach Carlisle ====
The frequently projected Newcastle-Carlisle canal was never built. Instead the engineer surveying for the best line for a canal recommended that a railway be built: the Newcastle and Carlisle Railway's act of Parliament, the Newcastle-upon-Tyne and Carlisle Railway Act 1829 (10 Geo. 4. c. lxxii), received royal assent in 1829, and the first stretch of railway at the western end (and the first passenger line in Cumbria) opened into Carlisle on 19 July 1836. The temporary eastern terminus of this line was at Greenhead; more accurately at Blenkinsopp Colliery. Coal from pits at Midgeholme and Blenkinsop could now be delivered to Carlisle by railway, and the import of coal to Carlisle by the canal (one of the initial reasons for its construction) was no longer economic. However an extension of the N&CR from London Road Junction to the canal basin opened on 9 March 1837, giving the possibility of using the canal for outward shipment of coal (including, after the completion of the N&CR as far as Gateshead in 1838, Tyneside coal and coke for Ireland and Irish Sea ports). (Note: Tyne coal was preferred by customers, and West Cumbrian coal was regarded as unsuitable for coking)

There was a greater depth of water at the entrance to the canal than at the entrance to Maryport harbour, but the problems of navigation in the upper Solway meant that sailing ships were more dependent on favourable winds to reach Port Carlisle. The annual shareholders' meeting in 1826 was told that "it often happened that the navigation was stopped for six, seven, or nine weeks together by the prevalence of adverse winds"; this problem had held back the use of the canal for valuable goods (where the cost of adequate buffer stocks would be prohibitive) but was now obviated by a weekly steam packet service to and from Liverpool. This was not a complete solution: the canal had not been designed to take steamships, there was not enough depth of water at low tide at the harbour mouth to keep large steamships afloat, and the heavy machinery in steamships made them much less tolerant of grounding when the tide went out. The company therefore sought an act of Parliament authorising the construction of a 'floating dock' (i.e. not a dock that floated, but a wet dock with lock gates to retain sufficient depth of water that ships in the dock remained afloat) at the canal mouth. The prospect of this (and the fact that some canal company directors were also directors of the Newcastle and Carlisle Railway) helped the N&CR to decide against active involvement in the promotion of a railway from Carlisle to Maryport. Although the act of Parliament, the Port Carlisle Dock Act 1836 (6 & 7 Will. 4. c. lx) was obtained (royal assent 7 June 1836) the 'floating dock' at Port Carlisle was never built.

For the time being the canal profited from the railway connection (in July 1838 a dividend of 3% was declared, receipts July 1837–June 1838 being 33% higher than the previous year; in July 1839 a further 24% increase in revenue and a dividend of 4% was announced), The subsequent arrival of other railways in Carlisle, however, was bad news for the canal. The completion of the Maryport and Carlisle Railway in 1845 gave an alternative outlet for Tyne coal via the port of Maryport. After the completion of the Whitehaven Junction Railway in 1847 the West Cumbrian ports had the advantage of offering a return cargo: Tyne coal could be shipped via Whitehaven and the emptied waggons used to carry Cumberland iron ore back to Tyneside. In 1848-9 both the Newcastle and Carlisle and the Maryport and Carlisle were under the control of George Hudson, and Tyne coal was accordingly routed to West Cumbrian ports. The arrival in Carlisle of the Lancaster and Carlisle Railway in 1846 gave the possibility of reliable rail transport of high-value goods from Liverpool to Carlisle (with the L&C offering a substantial rebate for exclusivity). For passenger transport to Liverpool, steamers were still cheaper than railways, but travel via Maryport was four hours quicker than via Port Carlisle, and the fare was the same. The opening of the Glasgow, Dumfries and Carlisle Railway between Dumfries and Carlisle in August 1848 meant that for this traffic Port Carlisle was also competing with Annan Waterfoot, a superior Solway anchorage now easily reached by rail.

The channel of the Eden moved away from the canal entrance; from May 1849 the Liverpool steamers were unable to approach the port but had to land their passengers at Annan. and there were concerns that even the small boats which could use the canal would soon be unable to enter it from the Solway. The canal company thought the problem was caused by a jetty erected by Lord Lonsdale at Raven Bank, about 2 km upstream of the canal entrance, but it took time to convince Lord Lonsdale of this and persuade him to remove the jetty at the company's expense; not until the autumn of 1851 was this done, the Carlisle Journal reporting 'the most rapid and beneficial results', but not until April 1852 were large steamers again able to use Port Carlisle harbour.

Because of capital expenditure on remedial engineering, the canal company had accumulated considerable debts; by the 1840s each £50 canal share had associated with it £52 of borrowings, interest on which had to be paid at 4½% before there was any question of a dividend being paid. By 1848, the canal had to reduce its charges to compete with the railways; however once interest was paid, the canal was barely profitable, and its bankers asked for a lien on company property. In 1849 and again in 1850 only 4% could be paid on the company's borrowings. in 1851 only 3%, in 1852 1%.

=== Port Carlisle Dock and Railway ===
==== Conversion to a railway ====
Port Carlisle Dock and Railway Act 1853
- Act of Parliament
- Parliament of the United Kingdom
- Long title: An Act to authorize the Abandonment of the Carlisle Canal, and the making of a Railway in lieu thereof, from the Newcastle-upon-Tyne and Carlisle Railway at Carlisle to Port Carlisle; to repeal the Acts relating to the Carlisle Canal and Docks, and to re-incorporate the Company; to authorize the raising of a further Sum of Money; and to confer additional Powers; and for other Purposes.
- Citation: 16 & 17 Vict. c. cxix

Dates
- Royal assent: 4 August 1853

Text of statute as originally enacted

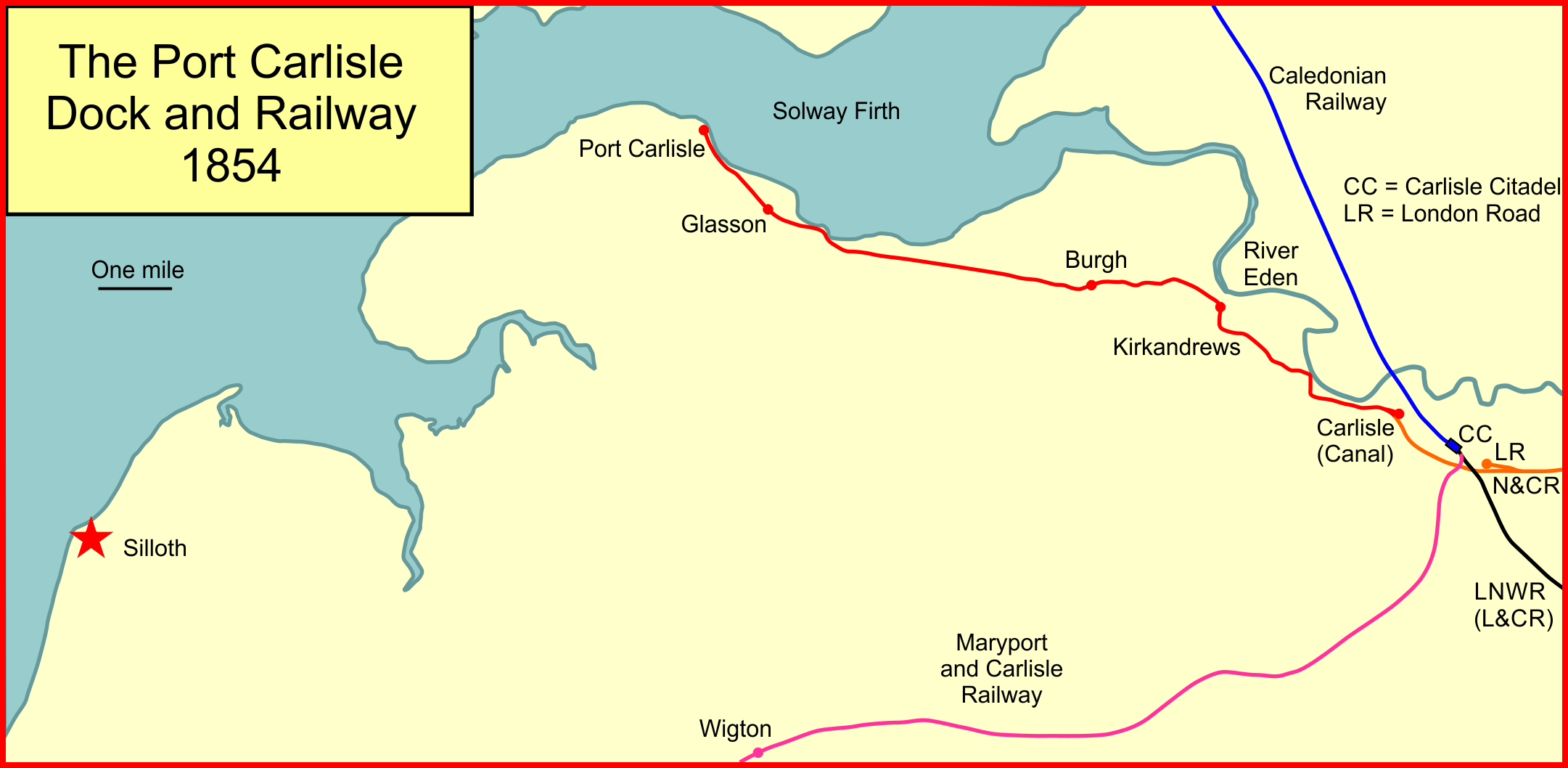
System map of the Port Carlisle Dock and Railway in 1854

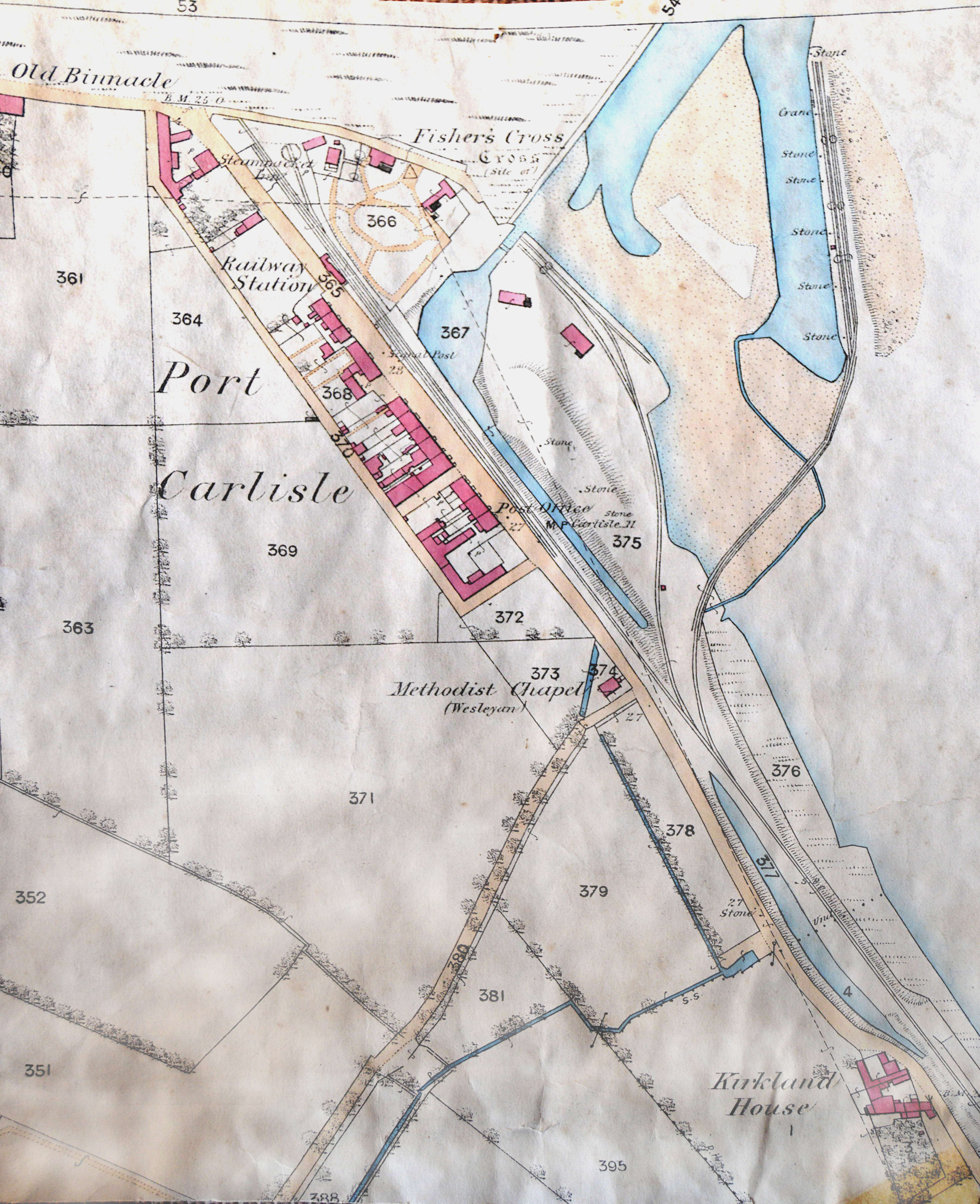
Map of Port Carlisle, after 1854, showing the infilled canal and new railway

At the height of the canal's prosperity in 1847 (when the gross revenue of the canal was over £9,200) the canal company directors were already investigating the possibility of converting the canal to a railway, and leasing it to the Newcastle and Carlisle: the Caledonian Railway and the Lancaster and Carlisle were also approached as possible lessees. Nothing came of this, but in 1852 (when revenues had dropped to £3,600) the shareholders approved seeking an act of Parliament reincorporating the canal company as the Port Carlisle Dock and Railway Company and authorising the conversion and the construction of a dock at Port Carlisle to take large screw steamers. The conversion was to be funded by preference shares taking precedence over existing shares and existing mortgages: The Port Carlisle Dock and Railway Act 1853 (16 & 17 Vict. c. cxix) received royal assent on 4 August 1853, having been unopposed. The powers under the 1836 act to create a floating dock at Port Carlisle were not renewed; the act's promoters saw no need to bring to the attention of Parliament the inadequacy of the existing facilities at Port Carlisle, but the directors had already minuted in favour of extension of the line to Silloth; further expenditure on Port Carlisle was therefore thought unwise.

The canal had already closed on 1 August 1853, in hopes of completing the conversion by 8 February 1854. However, the contractor carrying out the conversion lacked urgency and railway expertise; only after borrowing an engineer from the Lancaster and Carlisle to manage the job and permanent way staff from the Newcastle and Carlisle to correctly set up points and crossings was the new railway opened (for goods traffic on 22 May 1854 and passenger traffic on 22 June 1854). There was no opening ceremony – the morning train from Carlisle carried twelve passengers, the afternoon train fifty. Steamer services between Liverpool and Port Carlisle resumed at the end of July 1854 but were soon taken off: a steamer bought for Liverpool-Silloth service attempted a regular service to Port Carlisle in 1856, but initially could not reliably reach Port Carlisle. The line was single throughout and followed the alignment of the canal throughout except at Kirkandrews where a curve avoiding low-lying ground was smoothed out by building an embankment. The route was therefore broadly level except for short sharp gradients corresponding to the six former canal locks, but had unusually tight curves for a railway. Trains did not run into Citadel station (at this point there was no rail connection) but into Canal station on the site of the former canal basin in Caldewgate. (Note: To clarify a potential source of confusion for locals: this was not on the current Canal Street in Carlisle (so named because it led to the canal from the southern bridge over the Caldew) but immediately north-west of the biscuit factory) There was an intermediate station at Burgh; request stops at Kirkandrews and Glasson opened shortly afterwards. The new railway was initially worked with a single locomotive and a single train by the Newcastle and Carlisle Railway, but the company acquired a tank engine of its own late in 1855, a second (tender) engine being purchased in 1856.

==== Decline of the Port Carlisle branch ====
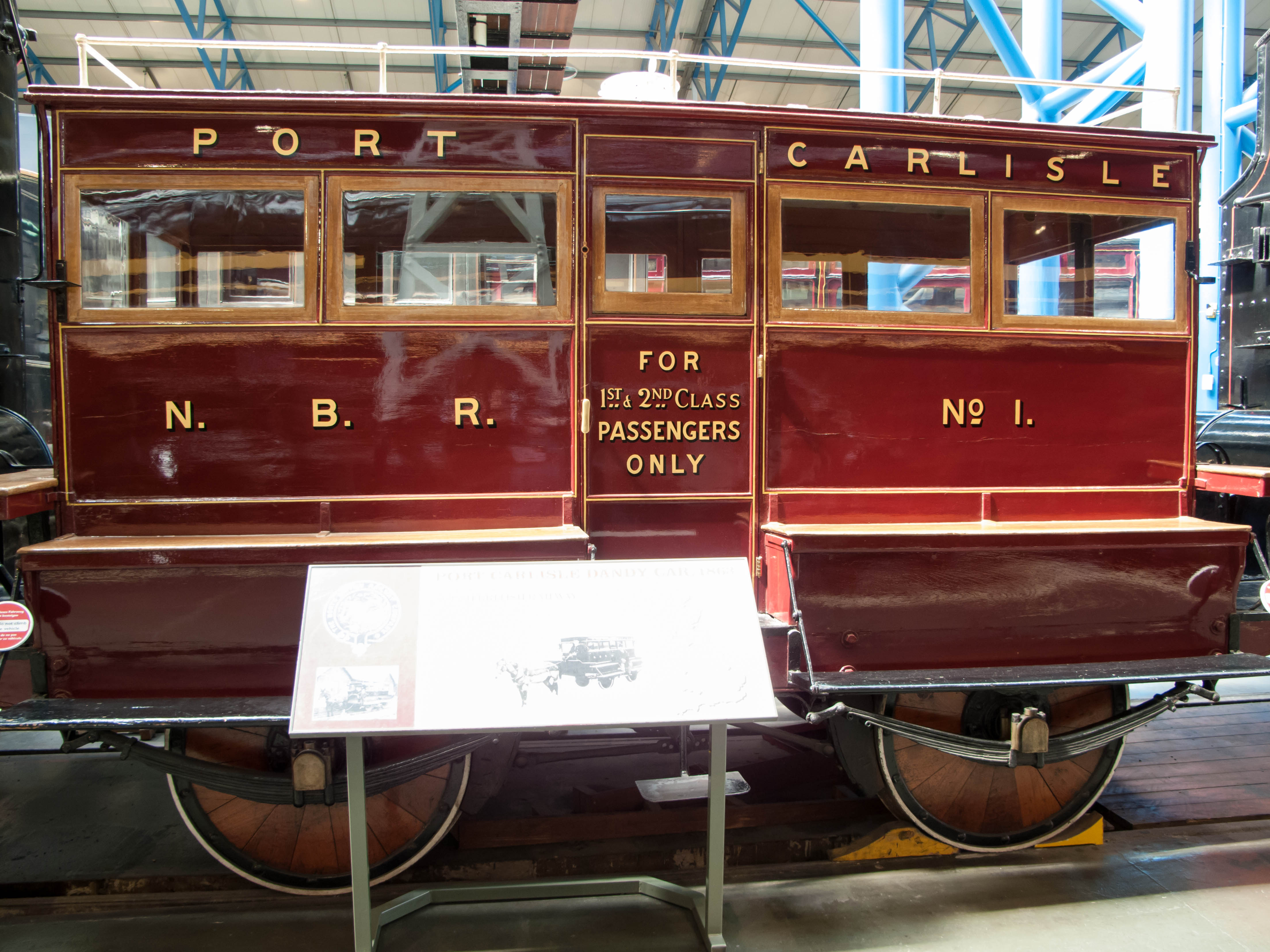
Dandy no. 1; first and second class passengers sat in the interior; third class passengers sat on the longitudinal benches looking outwards.

Once Silloth superseded Port Carlisle, Port Carlisle–Drumburgh became a branch line, and one with little passenger traffic. In 1857 locomotive traction was withdrawn, and horse traction introduced on passenger traffic on the branch. On 23 April 1858, it was reported that "the engines had been saved running 1,887 miles during 3 months ending 4 April in consequence of running the passengers between Drumburgh and Port Carlisle by horse instead of engine." The first coach was obtained from Bartons of Carlisle, but it was replaced in 1859 by "Dandy no. 1" (now preserved in the National Railway Museum) a four-wheeler built on stagecoach lines, with accommodation for three classes of passenger – built at St Margarets (Edinburgh) by the North British Railway. Used for the winter of 1856 on the NBR North Berwick branch, it had not produced the cost savings hoped for. In 1863 the "New Dandy" replaced it, and in 1900 "Dandy no. 2" was brought in. Intending passengers at Carlisle were warned that, due to the limited accommodation in the Dandy, they might need to wait at Drumburgh for a second journey by the Dandy if the first was full.

Track on the Port Carlisle line received little attention for many years, and by 1 January 1899 locomotive haulage of goods trains was considered to be dangerous; the goods service was suspended, resuming with horse traction on 1 May 1899. After remedial work on the track, the branch reverted (4 April 1914) to locomotive operation of passenger and goods traffic. A Sentinel steam railcar was introduced on the line in 1929 as an attempt to reduce the cost of passenger train operation, but passenger use was light and passenger services on the branch were withdrawn on 31 May 1932.

=== The Silloth Bay project ===
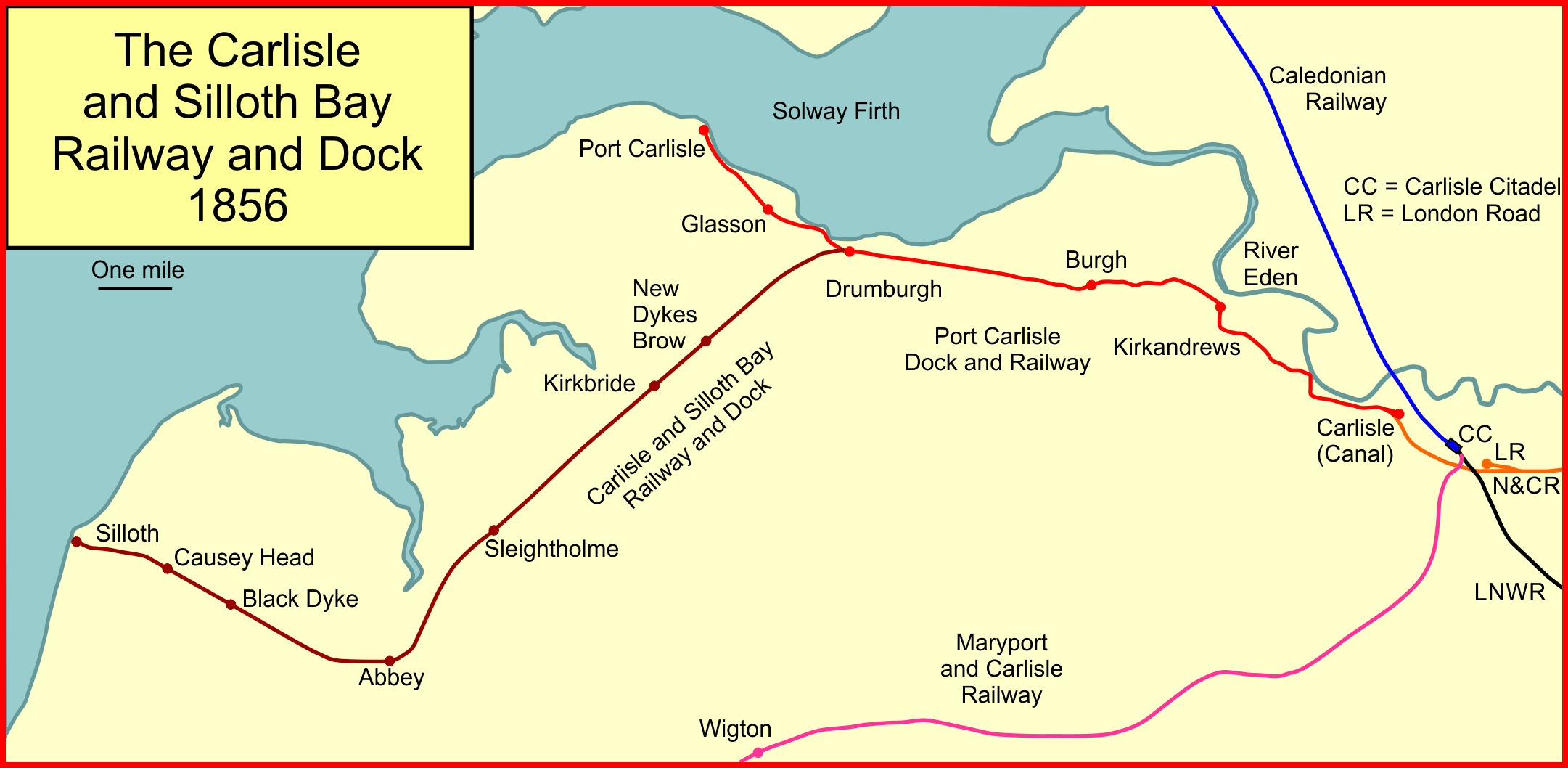
System map of the Carlisle and Silloth Bay Railway and Dock in 1856

The railway fared no better than the canal: an unfriendly analysis of the company's finances showed that in 1855-1856 the company made a profit (before paying interest) of £873 but was due to pay interest of more than £4,000; furthermore the company had unsecured liabilities of over £20,000. Rather than accept defeat, it was hoped that the construction of a floating dock at Silloth served by a line from Drumburgh on the Port Carlisle railway would transform the fortunes of the company.

==== Genesis ====
The idea of providing a port for Carlisle at Silloth Bay had been mooted even before the canal had been built, and had grown more attractive as the problems of Port Carlisle became more evident. In 1847, to reassure the Newcastle and Carlisle as potential lessees, the canal company commissioned a survey of the navigation to Port Carlisle. The survey as published eulogised Silloth Bay – there was more than enough water in the Solway channels for a battleship to reach Silloth Bay and to ride there 'at all times and at all seasons' and was much more guarded about navigation from there to the canal entrance: 'The navigation ... although easy, is in narrow channels, and, from the constant shifting of the banks, renders it necessary to keep a vigilant eye and shift the buoys as required. It ... requires the watchful eye of the careful pilot, who is constantly traversing it, to be fully competent to master it, and carry his ship through safely, or handle her in a seaman-like manner, if he gets her into difficulties; but two or three trips up and down, if the channel be steady, would qualify to pilot.' In April 1852, the directors minuted that the conversion of the canal to railway should have in view its ultimate extension to Silloth Bay "the natural, and in every other respect, the most desirable terminus of the line, and the most eligible port for Carlisle" as shown by the 1847 investigation. One of the inducements to canal shareholders to agree to conversion was that if they refused a bill would be brought forward to build a railway from Carlisle to Silloth and establish a better harbour there.

==== The project executed ====
Carlisle and Silloth Bay Railway and Dock Act 1855
- Act of Parliament
- Parliament of the United Kingdom
- Long title: An Act for making a Railway from the Port Carlisle Railway in the Township of Drumburgh to or near to the Coat Lighthouse in Silloth Bag in the Parish of Holme Cultram in the County of Cumberland, and also a Dock and Jetty at Silloth Bay; and for making Arrangements with the Port Carlisle Dock and Railway Company; and for other Purposes.
- Citation: 18 & 19 Vict. c. cliii

Dates
- Royal assent: 16 July 1855

Text of statute as originally enacted

In 1854 a parliamentary bill was introduced to make a floating dock at Silloth and a railway 12.75 miles long to it, leaving the Port Carlisle line near Drumburgh. The Maryport and Carlisle Railway opposed the Silloth Bay project as intended to create facilities competing with its own adequate provision for linking Carlisle and Tyneside with the Irish Sea and the bill failed after an independent survey failed to confirm the presence of a deep-water channel close inshore at the intended dock location (immediately south of the Cote lighthouse). In 1855, the Bill was again submitted; the proposed dock location was now about three-quarters of a mile further south (and was therefore now outside the shelter of Silloth Bay). This time the committee decided that the Silloth line was insufficiently close to the Maryport line to be regarded as a competitor: the bill authorising the Carlisle and Silloth Bay Railway and Dock Company with capital of £75,000 for the railway and £80,000 for the dock received its royal assent on 16 July 1855, becoming the Carlisle and Silloth Bay Railway and Dock Act 1855 (18 & 19 Vict. c. cliii).

The railway was constructed rapidly, and opened on 28 August 1856 (henceforth a "United Committee" oversaw the operation of both the Silloth and Port Carlisle railways, although they remained distinct companies), but not until 1857 were the intermediate stations at Kirkbride and Abbey opened and the telegraph installed on the line (in October 1856, aid with dealing with a derailment at Silloth had to be summoned from Carlisle by sending a man on horseback to Port Carlisle.) With the railway complete, work on the facilities at Silloth could begin in earnest. In September 1856 the chairman of the Port Carlisle Railway told Silloth Company shareholders that the two companies must sink or swim together; the Port Carlisle Railway could hardly keep its head above water, and they looked to the Silloth Company "as a man about to be drowned looked to a swimming jacket" but hopefully they would soon "float together into the harbour of prosperity". By May 1857 a jetty had been built into deep water, and the steamer service from Liverpool went to Silloth, rather than Port Carlisle. The foundation stone of the dock was laid in August 1857 by Sir James Graham; the completed "Marshall Dock" (a 4-acre (1.4 ha) wet dock) opening two years later on 3 August 1859. The Silloth companies contracted with the North British Railway to supply the rolling stock to work the line, at the same time selling to the NBR the lines' existing rolling stock.

==== Critics and opponents – local politics ====
Whereas the promotion of the canal had been essentially bi-partisan, this was not the case with the Silloth Bay project. Its chief advocates were the Whig manufacturers of Carlisle and Carlisle corporation, which they controlled. The Tory Carlisle Patriot, initially no worse than neutral on the project, began to object to the effective expropriation of the Canal Company assets, then widened its criticism to what it saw as other instances of disingenuity and want of candour on the part of the promoters. Its most fundamental criticism was that it was of little concern to the Silloth promoters whether the project would pay a dividend, as long as it reduced costs for Carlisle-based manufacturers. After the rejection of the 1854 Bill, a leading advocate of the Silloth project alleged that the editor of the Patriot was really in favour of the project, but was forced by a creditor to oppose it, and had admitted as much in front of witnesses. This accusation, vehemently denied, ensured that the Patriot became not merely a critic of the project, but a committed opponent. (Note: Robert Perring , the editor of the Patriot would have been used to this sort of thing, but done better. He had previously edited the Leeds Intelligencer in opposition to the Leeds Mercury of Edward Baines, William Cobbett's "Great Liar of the North" and a skilled traducer of opponents.)

==== Enemies – railway politics ====
The chairman of the Newcastle and Carlisle had been present at the opening of the railway and promised to do all he could to assist the new enterprise, but by 1859 this friendship had become open hostility. The North British Railway, fearing being hemmed in between the Caledonian and the North Eastern Railway, had promoted projects which would allow it to reach Newcastle, Hexham and Carlisle and had entered negotiations with the North Eastern about a possible amalgamation. The N&C, alarmed by this, had negotiated agreements with the North Eastern which gave the latter control over freight rates charged on the N&C. Whilst the N&C had been independent, the all-rail route for Newcastle-Liverpool goods traffic (via York and Normanton over the NER) had not been competitive on price with sending the goods over the N&C to a Solway port and then by steamer to Liverpool. On gaining control, the NER effectively closed the N&C to this traffic. Exports of Tyne coal and coke from the Solway ports had also decreased substantially: although large amounts of Tyne coal and coke were still sent to West Cumbria, this was mostly for use in iron- and steel-works and the coal exported via the 4-acre wet dock at Maryport opened in 1857 was overwhelmingly from local mines.

The Silloth directors therefore welcomed a Caledonian Railway project to build a branch from Carlisle to Hawick via Langholm since this would give rail access to the collieries at Canonbie; but transferred their support to the North British Railway's rival project to extend their Edinburgh–Hawick line to Carlisle, since this (the Border Union Railway) gave the prospect of routing Edinburgh/Leith–Liverpool goods traffic through Silloth. The Silloth railways were originally (1857) to build a line to Rockliffe to meet the Border Union, but this was later (1858) varied:the NBR would build the line from Rockliffe to join the PCR with the Silloth companies subscribing for £300,000 of shares; this in its turn was varied; not the companies, but their directors were to subscribe for the shares.

The N&C stated they regarded the NBR (and by extension the Silloth system) as hostile, but denied that a reduction (in 1858) of the mileage rates charged for coal if the coal travelled more than 28 miles beyond the N&C was intended to discriminate in favour of Maryport and against Silloth. They similarly denied accusations that the charge of 11d per ton for the use of their one-and-a-half-mile Canal branch (the only connection the Silloth companies then had with other railways) were deliberately set so high as to choke off goods traffic onto the Silloth system. (Note: The Silloth companies, with a similar economy of truth, denied any connection with the NBR, other than the prospective physical one)

In 1857 the Caledonian Railway announced its intention to introduce a bill to make a branch connecting to the Port Carlisle Railway, to allow it and/or the Lancaster and Carlisle to negotiate running powers over the Port Carlisle and Silloth railways (and vice versa), and to allow it to enter into an agreement with the Port Carlisle and Silloth railways to work those lines. The Port Carlisle and Silloth railways objected to the provision for the Caledonian to work them; once this was removed the bill passed and became an act of Parliament on 28 June 1858: the Caledonian then offered to prioritise construction of the branch (and do the Port Carlisle and Silloth railways other good turns), provided only that they should cease to oppose the Caledonian's Carlisle-Hawick branch. This failed to detach the Silloth Bay railways from their allegiance to the North British Railway, but the Caledonian went ahead with the construction of the branch (a sharply curved single-track line from the Caledonian main line three-quarters of a mile north of Citadel station to Canal Junction, immediately north of Canal station), judging it cheaper to build it than to seek powers in a new act of Parliament to abandon it. (Note: The branch came into use soon after 30 June 1860 and gave the Caledonian access for goods trains to the Silloth system. It is not clear whether the goods trains ran to Port Carlisle, or were simply exchange trips to Canal Yard.)

==== The project in difficulties ====
The Silloth Bay project was therefore cut off from the traffic which (rightly or wrongly) it had looked to as its source of profit, and had to pin its hopes on the eventual arrival of the Border Union in Carlisle. Commenting on reports of 'bulging' of the seaward wall of the dock, the Carlisle Patriot noted that:

... for every £ of share capital paid up £4 has been borrowed' and borrowed not against the company's assets but on the private security of the directors': were the directors also going to meet the £10,000 of interest due every year? A quarter of a million pounds had been spent, and for what? 'Locomotives, carriages and waggons all sold to another company, there remain thirteen miles of railway, three indifferent station-houses, a large dock almost destitute of shipping, with its western wall so damaged as to excite apprehensions for its safety, and an excellent jetty. This is the "accomplished fact" which has been ushered into the world with so many loud huzzas.

Port Carlisle and Silloth Railway Companies Act 1860
- Act of Parliament
- Parliament of the United Kingdom
- Long title: An Act to alter, amend, and extend the Powers of the Acts relating to the Port Carlisle Dock and Railway, and Carlisle and Silloth Bay Railway and Dock Companies; to enable the Port Carlisle Dock and Railway Company to raise additional Capital; to enable both or either of the said Companies to run over and use Portions of the Railways of the Newcastle-upon-Tyne and Carlisle Railway Company; to compel the Newcastle-upon-Tyne and Carlisle Railway Company to afford Facilities and Accommodation upon their Railways to the Traffic of the said Companies; and for other Purposes.
- Citation: 23 & 24 Vict. c. cxxxiv

Dates
- Royal assent: 3 July 1860

In July 1860 the Port Carlisle Company obtained an act of Parliament, the Port Carlisle and Silloth Railway Companies Act 1860 (23 & 24 Vict. c. cxxxiv) giving it running powers over the N&C's Canal Branch and authorising the issue of another £40,000 of preference stock. In 1861 the Silloth company introduced a bill to build a branch from Abbey, crossing the Maryport and Carlisle at Leegate to serve collieries south of the M&C around Mealsgate, and to raise another £180,000 by preference shares and borrowing. The Maryport and Carlisle Railway would have welcomed the branch if it had gone no further than a junction with the M&C at Leegate, but regarded its continuation to Mealsgate as an invasion of their territory, and accordingly opposed the bill, offering to introduce a bill of their own in the next parliamentary session for a loop off the M&C main line to serve the Mealsgate collieries. At the committee hearing on the Silloth company's bill, counsel for the company admitted it was insolvent, and the secretary of the company said that 'it was no secret' that borrowings had exceeded that authorised by Parliament, and that thousands of pounds had been spent at Silloth on streets, sewerage, gasworks, hotel, and baths – all things helping the formation of a seaside resort, but none of them things on which expenditure was authorised by the act of Parliament incorporating the company. Without hearing witnesses opposed to the branch, the committee rejected the bill. Cross-examination of company witnesses had been used to explore the extent to which Silloth directors had persistently used their personal wealth to circumvent the requirements and limits of the company's act of Parliament, and the Carlisle Patriot, feeling amply justified, commented that the evidence:

disclosed such a state of reckless management and pecuniary insolvency that we may assume the Committee deemed it high time to stop the parties from adding to their misfortunes and difficulties [...] it shows the exact position in which the Company, or rather, the Directors and Manager of the company, now stand with reference to the shareholders, the creditors, and the public. It is evident that Parliament, in future, means to refuse to legalise reckless and wanton expenditure upon objects ultra vires the act of incorporation the company: all such unauthorised expenditure will therefore have to be borne by the parties by whom it is contracted."

=== Operation by the North British Railway ===
North British Railway, Silloth Railway and Dock (Lease) Act 1862
- Act of Parliament
- Parliament of the United Kingdom
- Long title: An Act to authorize a Lease of the Undertaking of the Carlisle and Silloth Bay Railway and Dock Company to the North British Railway Company; and for other Purposes.
- Citation: 25 & 26 Vict. c. xlvii

Dates
- Royal assent: 3 June 1862

North British Railway, Port Carlisle Railway and Dock (Lease) Act 1862
- Act of Parliament
- Parliament of the United Kingdom
- Long title: An Act to authorize a Lease of the Undertaking of the Port Carlisle Dock and Railway Company to the North British Railway Company; and for other Purposes.
- Citation: 25 & 26 Vict. c. xlviii

Dates
- Royal assent: 3 June 1862

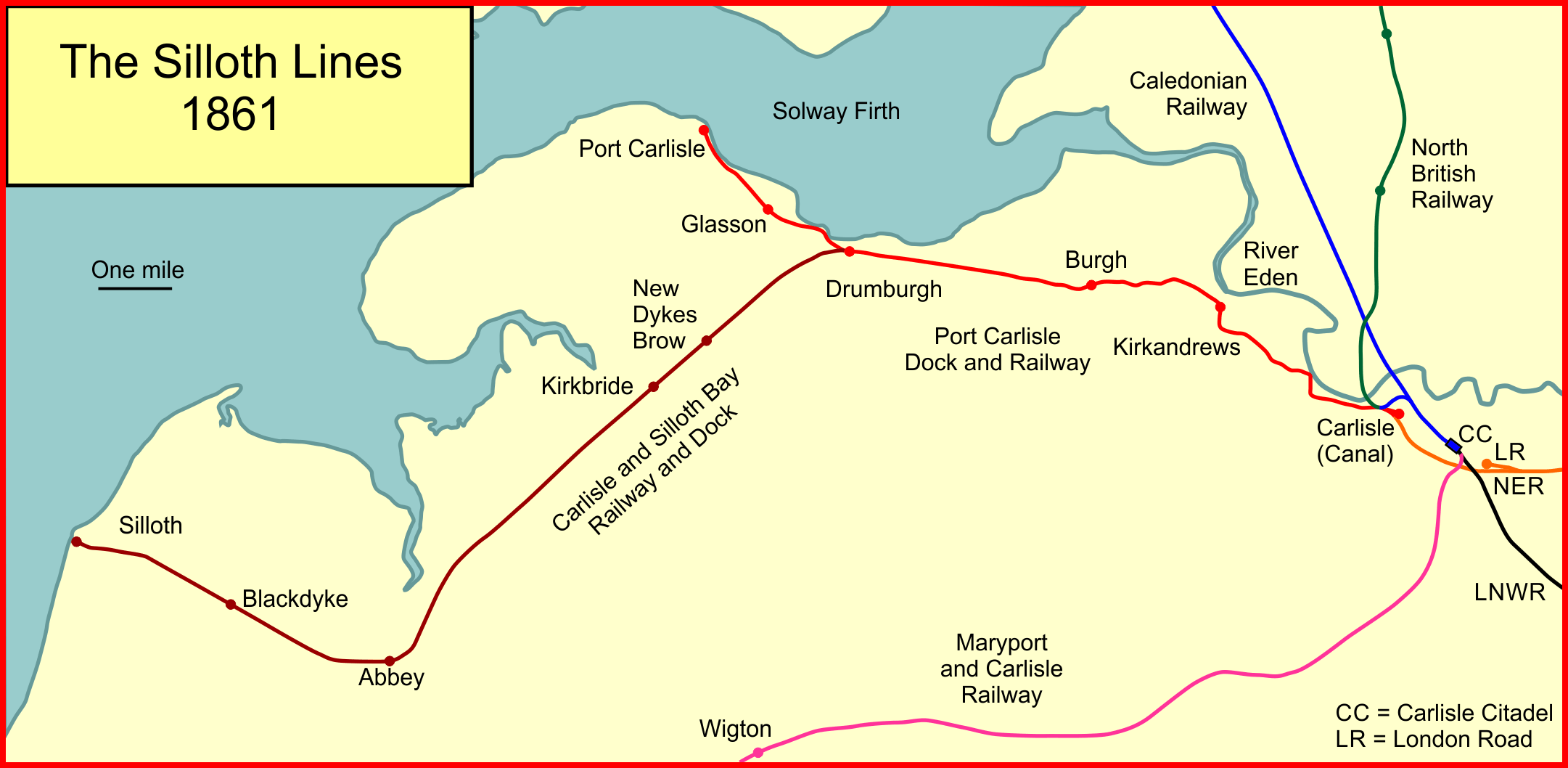
The Silloth lines in 1861 after the connection with the Waverley route

Fortunately, the Border Union Railway was now virtually complete, and in anticipation of this the North British Railway negotiated leases of the two railways in 1861, confirmed by the North British Railway, Silloth Railway and Dock (Lease) Act 1862 (25 & 26 Vict. c. xlvii) and the North British Railway, Port Carlisle Railway and Dock (Lease) Act 1862 (25 & 26 Vict. c. xlviii).

The Port Carlisle line was leased for £3,100 a year; its preference stock became NBR preference stock, its mortgage debt became debentures yielding 3% a year, and its ordinary stock was to get a dividend of 1% (or 3% less than the dividend on NBR ordinary stock if that exceeded 4%) The Silloth lease (negotiated separately) was for £2,000 a year: Silloth ordinary stock became NBR ordinary stock, its authorised debt became NBR debt. The ultra vires assets and borrowings were left to the Silloth company to liquidate: the directors responsible for acquiring assets not covered by the act of Parliament incorporating the company were treated as having personally bought those assets; they were also to assume personal responsibility for half the borrowing in excess of the amount authorised by the act, the other half to be redeemed by the issue of preference stock the dividend on which would be paid from the rent of the line. (Note: Unfortunately it was not long before a CSBR&D annual meeting found that different directors had different recollections of what had been agreed. The Silloth company issued £75,000 of 5% preference shares to its existing shareholders, the dividend on this to be met partly from the NBR dividend; consequently the dividend on ordinary shares was not the same as that on NBR ordinary shares) The requisite acts of Parliament were obtained, despite scathing comments ("The North British Company are the best hands in the world that I know of for making bad bargains") from Lord Redesdale the chairman of the Lords committee. (Note: The Maryport and Carlisle had initially opposed them, and a fresh bill for the Leegate branch, this time under the auspices of a nominally independent company. The Leegate bill was altered so that the new line went no further than a junction with the M&C at Leegate, and the M&C withdrew its opposition to this and the other bills. Although authorised, the Abbey-Leegate link was not built: the NBR itself introduced a bill for it in 1864, but this was withdrawn to avoid duplication of the Solway Junction Railway)

==== Solway Junction Railway ====
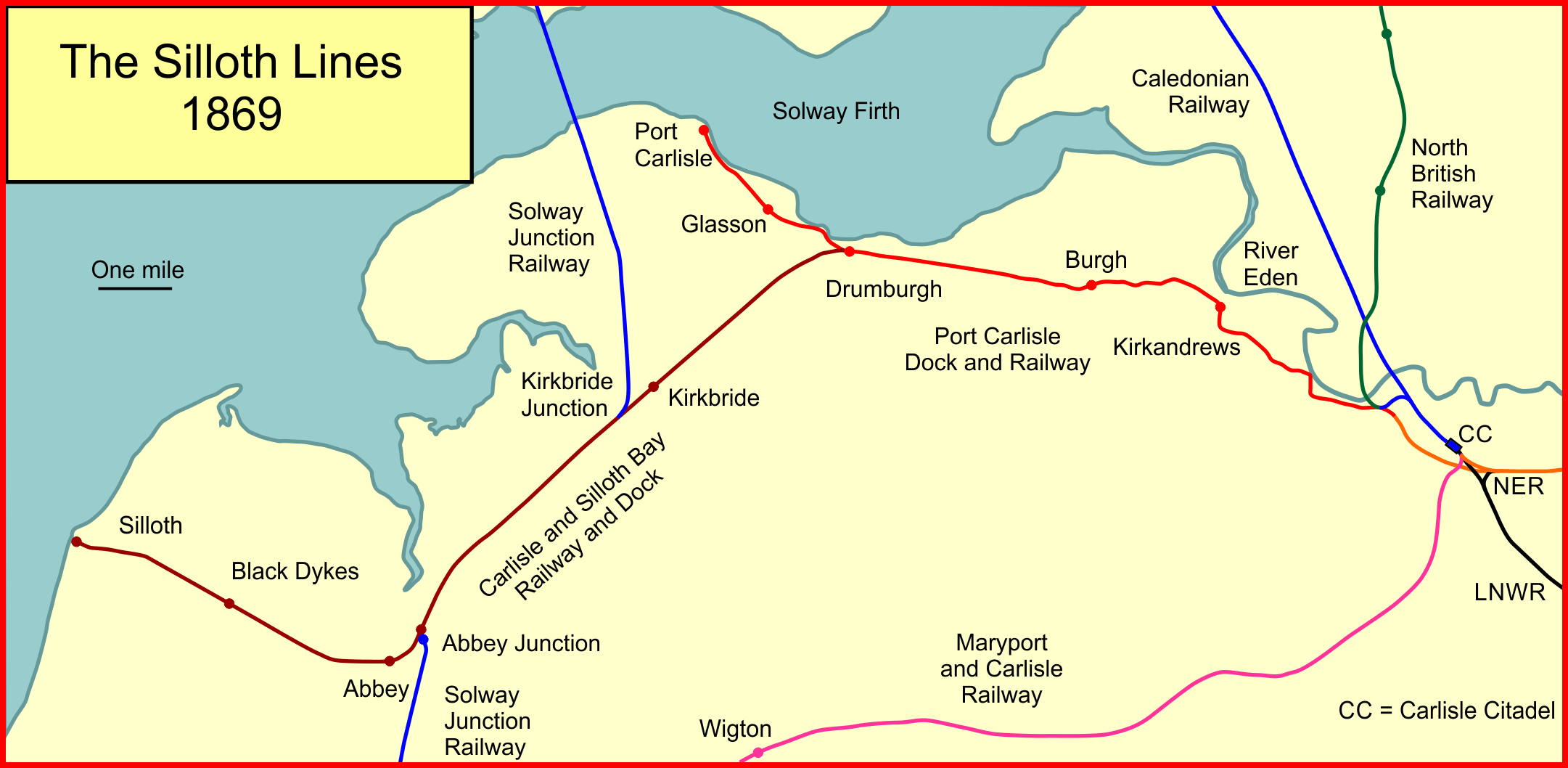
The Silloth lines in 1869 after the opening of the Solway Junction Railway

There was a heavy flow of iron ore from West Cumbria to ironworks in Ayrshire and Lanarkshire, either by sea or by rail via Carlisle. A rail crossing of the Solway well downstream of Carlisle would both shorten the route and avoid the bottleneck of Carlisle; to this end the Solway Junction Railway was promoted to run from the Caledonian Railway at Kirtlebridge to the Maryport and Carlisle Railway at Brayton, crossing the Solway by a viaduct from Annan to Bowness. Originally, the railway was to be carried on solid embankments as far as the low-water mark on either side, deeper water being crossed by a viaduct of 80 30-foot spans with a 36-foot opening span provided to allow the passage of small craft to the upper Solway (chiefly to Port Carlisle); the Board of Trade however objected to so major an obstruction to tidal flows and required a 50-foot opening span to allow the passage of steam tugs. The promoters accepted both objections at first, but the bill of 1867 made no provision for an opening span, the promoters arguing that the traffic of Port Carlisle was negligible and should not be allowed to compromise the viaduct design. This argument won the day; although the Board of Trade confirmed its earlier stand that the traffic of Port Carlisle was not negligible, Parliament was persuaded that it was insignificant in comparison to the projected traffic over the viaduct and as built the viaduct made no provision for ships to pass through it; this ended any commercial use of the harbour at Port Carlisle.

Goods traffic began running over the SJR on 13 September 1869, all services being operated by the Caledonian. Because of the panic of 1866, the SJR had great difficulty in attracting funding and construction was only completed after the Caledonian had injected £60,000 into it as 5% Preference shares, and the SJR had abandoned its original intention to run from Bowness to Brayton independently of the Silloth railway. Instead the SJR ran from Bowness to a junction with the Silloth line at Kirkbride; from there to Abbey the existing Silloth line was used (the SJR exercising running powers agreed with the NBR when the NBR was not yet aware of the Caledonian's involvement); at Abbey Junction the SJR left the Silloth line and ran on its own rails to Brayton. The NBR did not secure running powers over the Abbey-Brayton section of the SJR, and the Caledonian had sufficient hold on the SJR (which eventually amalgamated with it in 1895) to ensure that it never did.

==== Arrangements at Carlisle ====
Through passenger traffic over NBR-controlled lines between Edinburgh and Carlisle (what became known as the 'Waverley Route') began running at the start of July 1862. The Border Union crossed the Caledonian main line at Kingmoor and joined the Port Carlisle line half a mile north of Canal goods station. NBR passenger trains ran into Citadel station, exercising NBR running powers over both a short section of the Port Carlisle line and the connecting Caledonian branch (both doubled to accommodate main-line traffic). Canal was used as the NBR goods station and Silloth passenger trains still ran to it because the act of Parliament giving North British running powers over the Caledonian curve into Citadel station allowed the Caledonian to charge at a rate which choked off goods and short-haul passenger traffic. In 1864, the NBR therefore proposed to build its own extension from Canal to Citadel. Opposing the bill, Caledonian witnesses said that they had never been asked by the NBR to reduce their tolls, which they would be happy to do; when the NBR rejected the offer as they wanted independent access the Bill was thrown out. After further negotiation on the reduction of tolls, from 1 July 1864 Silloth trains ran into Citadel, rather than Canal. In 1865 the NBR obtained an act of Parliament to construct their own line into Citadel, but this was for goods traffic only. This line was never built: eventually the project was overtaken by a more fundamental rearrangement of Citadel which included avoiding lines to allow goods traffic to bypass the station which claimed (with a higher priority) the land the NBR link would have occupied.

==== Steamer Services from Silloth ====
The Silloth-Liverpool steamship service had been operated by a company with no formal connection with the Silloth railway, other than overlapping directorates. Its unprofitability had led to the withdrawal of one of the two steamers on the route. (Note: officially 'for repairs', but soon after her withdrawal she was captured by the USS Huron when trying to run munitions into Charleston, South Carolina, a Confederate port) The NBR however set up its own line of steamers to serve Silloth. (Note: Initially this was done via a third party, backed by personal guarantees by directors, since the NBR had no power to operate ships, other than ferries, and parliamentary standing orders forbade railway companies being given such powers; the NBR however obtained the necessary act, but initially only for services between Silloth and Belfast) The chairman of the NBR explained to share holders the logic of this:

It was because the Port of Carlisle and Silloth railways afforded an independent access to Liverpool and to Ireland that the North British directors were anxious to possess those railways and those ports. The trade between Liverpool and Carlisle, the trade between Liverpool and Dundee, and the trade between Liverpool and Lancashire and the districts to the north and west … is very extensive indeed. The trade between Belfast… and other ports of Ireland and these districts is also extensive… So far as regards Liverpool at any rate, it would have been perfectly competent for other railway companies possessing the intervening route by railway… to prevent the participation of the North British Company in its just and fair share of that large traffic between Liverpool and the districts I have mentioned. Had the North British Company been unable to take an independent route of its own, uncontrolled by the railway companies, it would have been extremely difficult to have obtained a fair share of the traffic; and in respect to Ireland, if there had been no means of forwarding the traffic which may arrive at Carlisle and Silloth from the North British system, we should have been deprived of our fair share of the traffic which flows naturally between the two countries

The Caledonian and London and North Western railways refused the NBR any share of unconsigned rail traffic for Scotland arriving at Carlisle (and obstructed traffic arriving at Carlisle over the Waverly Route) on the grounds that the NBR was an East Coast Company and not entitled to a share of West Coast traffic as well. Coastal steamers were competitive with railways on price, and there were therefore traffic-sharing and price-fixing arrangements between railways and coastal steamship companies for traffic down both sides of Britain (East Coast railways with North Sea steamers; West Coast railways with Irish Sea steamers). The NBR, however, was not party to the West Coast & Irish Sea agreement and could therefore undercut it and develop considerable trade from the East of Scotland (e.g. Dundee) to Liverpool via Silloth, both lucrative in itself and a useful means to exert pressure on the West Coast Companies; the L&NWR duly offered to relax its blockade on NBR freight arriving at Carlisle if the aggressive pricing of the Silloth route stopped. The Silloth route lost its importance for bargaining in 1876 with the completion of the Settle-Carlisle line and the arrival of the Midland Railway in Carlisle, but the trade through it was still of interest to the NBR; although the Belfast service proved unprofitable and was abandoned there was a daily steamer service to and from Liverpool until October 1918, and a twice-weekly service to and from Dublin which made Silloth one of the major ports of entry for Irish cattle.

==== Replacement of Silloth dock ====
Soon after the opening of the wet (floating) dock at Silloth, the Carlisle Patriot had reported both an inward bulge of the dock's west wall and bubbling at the dock sill. The company (and its supporters) had responded that neither effect was as severe or as significant as the Patriot was suggesting. However, in April 1879, the wall failed, dislodging one of the dock gates, and blocking the entrance to the dock with fallen masonry. The Silloth steamers ran temporarily from Maryport, whilst the failed gate and masonry were removed, after which Silloth returned to operation, but as a tidal harbour. Informed that the repair of the existing dock would mean the closure of the harbour for two years, the North British board decided to instead build a new and larger wet dock behind the old dock, which would then serve as a tidal entrance basin. The Silloth and Port Carlisle companies were amalgamated with the NBR by an act of Parliament of 12 August 1880 and construction of the new wet dock began in 1882. The work (and financing) of this was carried out in parallel with the construction of the second Tay Rail Bridge, the NBR concentrating its efforts on these two projects. The replacement dock, 50% larger (six-acre rather than four) and costing about £90,000 opened in July 1885.

==== Development of Silloth ====
Its opponents had noted that the western terminus of the Silloth railway was to be built in a rabbit warren, (Note: Possibly not strictly true, but its construction required the purchase of some of Blitterlees Bank, otherwise known as Blitterlees Common or Blitterlees Rabbit Warren) and that there were only three or four farms at Silloth. The CSBD&R bought land north of the site of the docks and the station, levelled and grassed 'the great Sahara of Silloth' and laid out the infrastructure (streets, sewerage, gas works) to support a small town. Initial hopes that Silloth would be a second Liverpool were soon replaced by hopes of it becoming a second Southport. As early as June 1858 houses (including one "well calculated for a Family Hotel or Boarding House") were being advertised for sale or to let with the claim that Silloth had "the mildest and most genial atmosphere of any place in the Kingdom, with the exception of Torquay" (Note: This, rather than any comparison of facilities, lay behind the description of Siilloth as "the Torquay of the North". Modern data as presented by the UK Met Office would suggest the climate of Silloth, whilst better than that of local rivals (or the East coast of Scotland), is comparable with that of Blackpool or Southport, rather than Torquay) The railway promoted Silloth as a destination for Sunday School (and works) outings and offered the general public of Carlisle cheap trips to Silloth on Tuesdays, Thursdays, and ('for the working classes') Saturday afternoons. With the opening of the Waverley Route and lease of the Silloth companies by the NBR, Silloth was promoted heavily by the NBR as a destination for trips and as a holiday resort: "The temperature at Silloth, it has been ascertained, is fully as high as some of the most favoured watering places in the South of England, and for people whose systems require strengthening it is far superior to any place on the east coast, and is equal to any of the much lauded bathing quarters on the Clyde. Lodgings are easily got, and are far from being high charged; and therefore to those who are not over-burthened with cash, it is a very desirable spot. The North British Railway Company, much to their credit, have reduced the fares to Silloth so low that the expense of travelling is a mere trifle. At present return tickets extending over a month are issued from Hawick at the small sum of 6s 1d, and just now, in consequence, the number of visitors from here is very great, and all who have been there speak well of it; there is every likelihood that there will be a large addition of visitors next season." enthused the Kelso Chronicle. The Scotsman was more measured in its praise: "… The place itself is very balmy and equable, the houses cleanly, and the hotels moderate. Here are, it is true, no gardens for vegetables, no public library, and the absence of some other conveniencies that mark our more established resorts; but there are good baths, a reading room of papers, to which some Scotch papers, by the way, might very suitably be added, a few bathing coaches, some cricket playing, and above all, there is the beautiful scenery of the bay, and the Dumfriesshire hills on the other side, beyond which the setting sun often departs in great beauty." Silloth was successfully launched on its career as a holiday resort, but it underwent little further development and remained smaller than many villages. Although in 1901 it had more lodging houses than either Windermere or Keswick, when a new parish was created in 1872 to cover the new town, the population was estimated to be 1365.

South of the docks and the main railway there was little development, but what there was served by the railway. A committee seeking to establish a Sea Bathing Institution (as an adjunct to the Cumberland Infirmary) was offered a site in Silloth, but residents and railway shareholders objected that sea-bathing was the recommended treatment for unsightly skin diseases such as scrofula and the sight of sufferers would unsettle other visitors. A secluded site south of the dock on a pre-existing branch line to a salt works was offered instead; patients detrained not at the main Silloth station but at the Cumberland and Westmorland Convalescent Institution railway station, a wooden platform near the (now-renamed) institution, also referred to informally as 'the Silloth Sanatorium'. In 1886 Sir WG Armstrong Mitchell & Company set up an artillery range south of Silloth in 1886 for test firing of smaller-calibre ordnance before fitting to warships built at their works on Tyneside. The firing position was on the seaward side of Blitterlees Bank, and the range ran south-westward, parallel to the coast. The range was served by an extension of the saltworks branch to an untimetabled station about a mile south of Silloth station. In 1892, the NBR, catering for Scottish holiday-makers, laid out a golf course on much of the inland portion of Blitterlees Bank; The course was leased to the Carlisle and Silloth Golf Club for £1 a year, but non-members had to be allowed to play and the NBR retained control of the level of 'green fees' paid by them.

=== Grouping and after ===
The North British Railway was a constituent of the new London and North Eastern Railway (LNER) as part of the Grouping of the railways of Great Britain in 1923, following the Railways Act 1921.

During World War II Silloth was a safe harbour compared with the larger west coast ports which were subject to heavy bombing. The coal hoists at Silloth worked 24 hours a day handling Tyneside coal.

Silloth remained popular as a holiday destination, but the traffic was seasonal. Two-car diesel multiple units were introduced on the line, replacing steam traction of passenger trains, on 29 November 1954. This was the second introduction of diesel multiple units in the Great Britain, the first having been in the West Riding.

In the early 1960s a major review of the railways of the country was undertaken, and a report was prepared which launched the so-called Beeching cuts; passenger traffic on the Silloth line was indicated for withdrawal. Passenger use was minimal except during the few weeks of the summer holiday period. It was argued that only the rail link could handle the peak traffic, but the Silloth line closed on 7 September 1964, triggering a mass demonstration, a sit-in on the track and other manifestations of hostility as the last trains operated.

== Topography ==
The Port Carlisle Dock and Railway Company opened its line on 22 June 1854; it closed between Port Carlisle and Drumburgh on 1 June 1932; and the section between Drumburgh and Carlisle closed on 7 September 1964; the final short section from Canal Junction to Canal station closed to passengers on 1 July 1864 when passenger trains were diverted to Citadel.

Locations on the line were:

- Port Carlisle; closed 1 January 1917; reopened 1 February 1919;
- Glasson; for some of its existence was served on Saturdays only; closed 1 January 1917; reopened 1 February 1919;
- Drumburgh; closed 4 July 1955; convergence of line from Silloth;
- Burgh; renamed Burgh-by-Sands in 1923;
- Kirkandrews; opened August 1854;
- Canal Junction; convergence of Waverley Route from Hawick; divergence of Caledonian Railway link to Citadel station;
- Port Carlisle Junction (station); opened July 1863 (although previous unadvertised use is possible); closed 1 July 1864;
- Carlisle Canal; closed 1 July 1864.

The Carlisle and Silloth Railway and Dock Company opened its line on 4 September 1856 and closed on 7 September 1964.

Locations on the line were:

- Silloth;
- Causey Head; opened November 1856, served on Saturdays only; renamed Causewayhead 1857; closed April 1859;
- Black Dyke; later renamed Blackdyke; served on Saturdays only, daily from May 1928;
- Abbeyholme; renamed Abbey; renamed Abbey Town 1889;
- Abbey Junction (station); opened 8 August 1870; closed 1 September 1921; convergence of Solway Junction Railway line from Aspatria; there was an adjacent Abbey Junction station on the Solway Junction line; both were occasionally referred to as Abbeyholme Junction early on;
- Sleightholme; served on Saturdays only; closed June 1857;
- Kirkbride Junction; divergence of Solway Junction Railway route to Annan;
- Kirkbride;
- New Dykes Brow; opened November 1856; served on Saturdays only; closed October 1866;
- Drumburgh; see above.

== See also ==
Carlisle railway history
