= Mabey Group =

98m Mabey Logistic Support Bridge built by the Romanian Engineer Battalion. Construction time 6 days, completed on 6 July 1996. Loading MLC60.

The Mabey Group is a British-based group of engineering companies, which specialises in steel fabrication, plant hire and construction products. It was initially established by Guy Mabey as a building supplies business in 1923, and expanded into engineering work, particularly bridging, under the leadership of his son, Bevil Mabey, after World War II. In the early 21st century, it was implicated in bribery scandals over corrupt payments to win contracts in countries including Iraq, Jamaica and Ghana. It sold its bridge business in May 2019 to US-based Acrow Bridge.

== History ==
Founded by Guy Mabey in 1923, his son Bevil Mabey expanded the company quickly after World War II by buying up spare Bailey bridges from the British Army. Mabey then developed a steel modular bridge package for use as highway structures. His design was lighter, with fewer components, had twice the loading capability, and could be built to longer spans. and with a much longer life.

These were extensively deployed in rough terrain in developing countries, and have been used for military purposes, helping British, US and Nato troops establish lines of communication in offensive and peacekeeping operations. For example, the Mabey Logistic Support Bridge was used in UN relief operations in Bosnia, Iraq and Afghanistan.

Mabey bridges have also been supplied for UK domestic purposes; in one week in November 2009, a 50m-span bridge was constructed to span the River Derwent and reconnect the Cumbria town of Workington after the Northside Bridge collapsed during floods.

Mabey & Johnson also built several permanent steel box-girder bridges, after acquiring the Chepstow subsidiary of the Glasgow-based Fairfield Shipbuilding and Engineering Company in 1966, which became known as Fairfield-Mabey. Its heavier steel fabricating capabilities helped Mabey build the Erskine Bridge over the River Clyde in Glasgow and the Avonmouth Bridge, and sections of the Humber Bridge, the Britannia Bridge in Anglesey and the City Bridge in Newport. Overseas, the company also built highway bridges and flyovers in Central America, the Caribbean and the Far East, and established a US-based company, Mabey Bridge Inc, in Baltimore, Maryland in 1989.

In the early 2000s, the Mabey Group made regular donations to the Conservative party in Wokingham. John Redwood, the Wokingham MP, was chairman of an associated investment company until March 2008. The Group also made donations to the Conservative party in Maidenhead, the constituency of Theresa May.

Expanded through acquisition, parts of the group were founded over 150 years ago. The group is still wholly family owned. With an administrative headquarters in Twyford, Berkshire, the group employs over 1,000 people in 40 locations. In 2010, over 90% of the company's production was exported to over 115 countries for use either in permanent or temporary bridging solutions. In the financial year to 30 September 2016, Mabey Group reported a pre-tax profit of £11.9m on a turnover of £109m.

In May 2019, the Group sold its largest division, Mabey Bridge, for an undisclosed sum, to the US-based Acrow Bridge. (Note: In 2011, Acrow attempted unsuccessfully to overturn a US Army decision to award a contract to Mabey, citing its involvement in bribery court actions.) Based in Lydney, Gloucestershire, Mabey Bridge supplies fabricated steel bridging, structural steelwork and associated construction services internationally. Until 2009 it was based in Chepstow, Monmouthshire; this site was used for manufacture of wind turbine towers until 2015, and was sold for redevelopment in February 2019. In 2017, Mabey Bridge made a loss of £1.8m from £24m revenue, mainly due to the closure of its wind turbine mast business.

=== Corruption ===
In 2005, Mabey & Johnson was accused of making excessive profits in aid projects in the Philippines, building what critics described as "bridges to nowhere", resulting in accusations of corruption and overcharging. Mabey denied any impropriety. Analysis of the company's accounts showed substantial increases in profits largely due to the Philippine contracts.

In January 2008, Mabey was implicated in a court action alleging the company sought to avoid UK anti-bribery legislation; a former sales manager accused the company of misconduct in sales to Jamaica, the Dominican Republic and Panama.

In its 2008 results, Mabey Group admitted publicly that it may have paid bribes to the regime of Saddam Hussein in order to win business in Iraq, under the Oil-for-Food Programme. In a retrospective United Nations report, it was alleged that Mabey paid a $202,000 (£101,000) kickback between 2001 and 2003, and was handed a $3.6m contract. In 2009, in a case brought by the SFO, the company pleaded guilty to the charge of "sought to influence decision makers in public contracts in Jamaica and Ghana between 1993 and 2001" at Westminster Magistrates' Court. In September 2009, Mabey & Johnson became the first major British company to be convicted of foreign bribery after admitting it had systematically paid bribes around the world to win contracts. The firm was ordered to pay more than £6.5m, including fines and reparations to foreign governments.

In February 2011, Mabey & Johnson sales director and shareholder David Mabey (son of Bevil Mabey) was jailed for eight months, and disqualified from acting as a company director for two years, for his role in making $420,000 (£258,000) of illegal payments to Iraqi officials. Colleague Charles Forsyth (managing director) was sentenced to 21 months and disqualified as a company director for five years, while a third executive, Richard Gledhill, was given an eight-month sentence suspended for two years.

=== Anti-bribery ===
In July 2012, after being forced to operate for three years under a court-appointed monitor, Mabey Group became the first organisation in the UK to pass an independent audit to become accredited to BS 10500: 2011 Specification for an Anti-bribery Management System - a management standard developed by the BSI Group in response to the Bribery Act 2010. In 2012 the director of the Serious Fraud Office described Mabey Bridge as "leading the way in implementing controls and procedures to ensure it is able to trade ethically in high risk jurisdictions".

In April 2019, Mabey "blew the whistle" about an alleged cartel between suppliers of groundworks products, prompting an investigation by the UK Competition and Markets Authority. Mabey's action allowed it to avoid fines and prosecution under the CMA's 'leniency' programme so long as it continues to cooperate with the investigation.

== Group companies ==
- Mabey Hire Ltd. - based in Ravensthorpe, Dewsbury. Formed on 1 October 2009 through the amalgamation of Mabey Hire, Murrayplant and Mabey Support Systems
- Mabey Australia and New Zealand - opened in 2012 after acquiring the APlant Hire speciality shoring business.

== Awards and recognition ==
The company won six Queen's Awards for Export Achievement (in 1973, 1978, 1982, 1987, 1998 and 2002).

In 2008, the company was listed in the Sunday Times Top Track 250 list of Britain's top 250 mid-market private companies by turnover.

On 5 October 2012, Mabey Bridge won both "Company of the Year" and "Company Showing Exceptional Growth" categories at the Monmouthshire Business Awards.

On 18 October 2012, Mabey Bridge won the "Manufacturer of the Year" award at the Insider Media "Made in Wales" awards. Sponsored by Barclays Bank, one unnamed judge is quoted as saying the company had "Great story, great products, of which Wales should be proud." The other companies shortlisted were SPTS Technologies, The Royal Mint and Sony UK Technology Centre.
