= Dunmail Park =

Shopping centre in Cumbria, England

Dunmail Park Shopping Centre
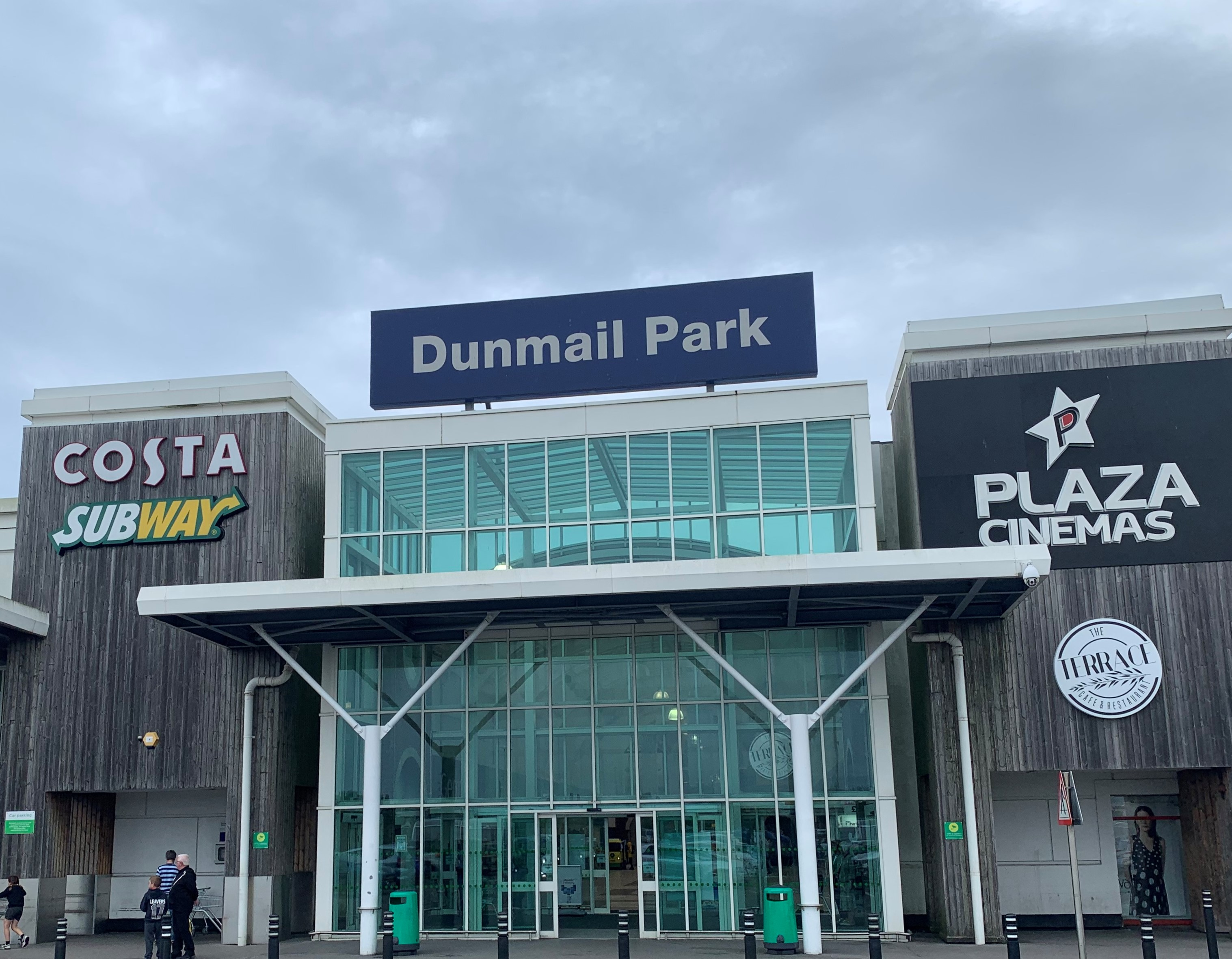
- The main entrance to Dunmail Park.
- Location: Maryport Road; Siddick, Cumbria, England
- Coordinates: 54°39′25″N 3°33′12″W
- Opened: 1988
- Manager: gordon osbaldestin
- Owner: J. Dixon & Son, Ltd.
- Num. of stores: 12
- Num. of anchor tenants: 2
- Parking: 475
- Website: www.dunmailpark.com

Dunmail Park is a shopping centre located in Siddick, near Workington, in Cumbria, England. It is located one-and-a-half miles north of the centre of Workington on the A596, and four-and-a-half miles south of the town of Maryport. It is named after Dunmail, a legendary king of Cumberland.

Construction began in 1986, following the purchase of the site by J Dixon & Son, Ltd on land near Siddick ponds which had been in use since the late 19th century for mining and iron working. The iron works previously on the site had, at one time, employed 5000 workers. Dunmail Park opened to the public in 1988, and is open Monday-Saturday from 07:00 until 23:00, and on Sundays from 10:30 until 23:00. However, individual shop opening times vary, and with the exception of the supermarket, most do not open before 09:00.

== Shops ==
By far the largest shop in terms of floor space at Dunmail Park is Asda, a supermarket, which took over the largest unit after previous anchor tenant Dixon's moved to a smaller unit in the shopping centre in 2010. When it opened, Asda employed 330 people from Workington and the surrounding area.

Other shops in the centre Cumbria Travel, an independent Travel Agent. Costa and Subway have outlets at Dunmail Park,. It has also been announced that The Range with a Homebase garden centre will be opening in October 26 and they will be reopening The Terrace Cafe is also present on the upper floor of the shopping centre, with seating for 120 diners and serving main meals (including Sunday lunches) as well as lighter café fare. Finally, there is a petrol station and a Hyundai car dealership on the site.

The shopping centre puts on a special event in November and December as Christmas approaches, with a Father Christmas-themed area for children as well as decorations.

== Parkway Cinema ==
Dunmail Park gained one of its biggest attractions in 2024, with the opening of Parkway Cinemas, a multiplex cinema. An independently-owned cinema, Parkway shows most of the major films released in the UK, as well as occasionally independent films and recordings of opera and ballet performances.

== Parking and public transportation ==
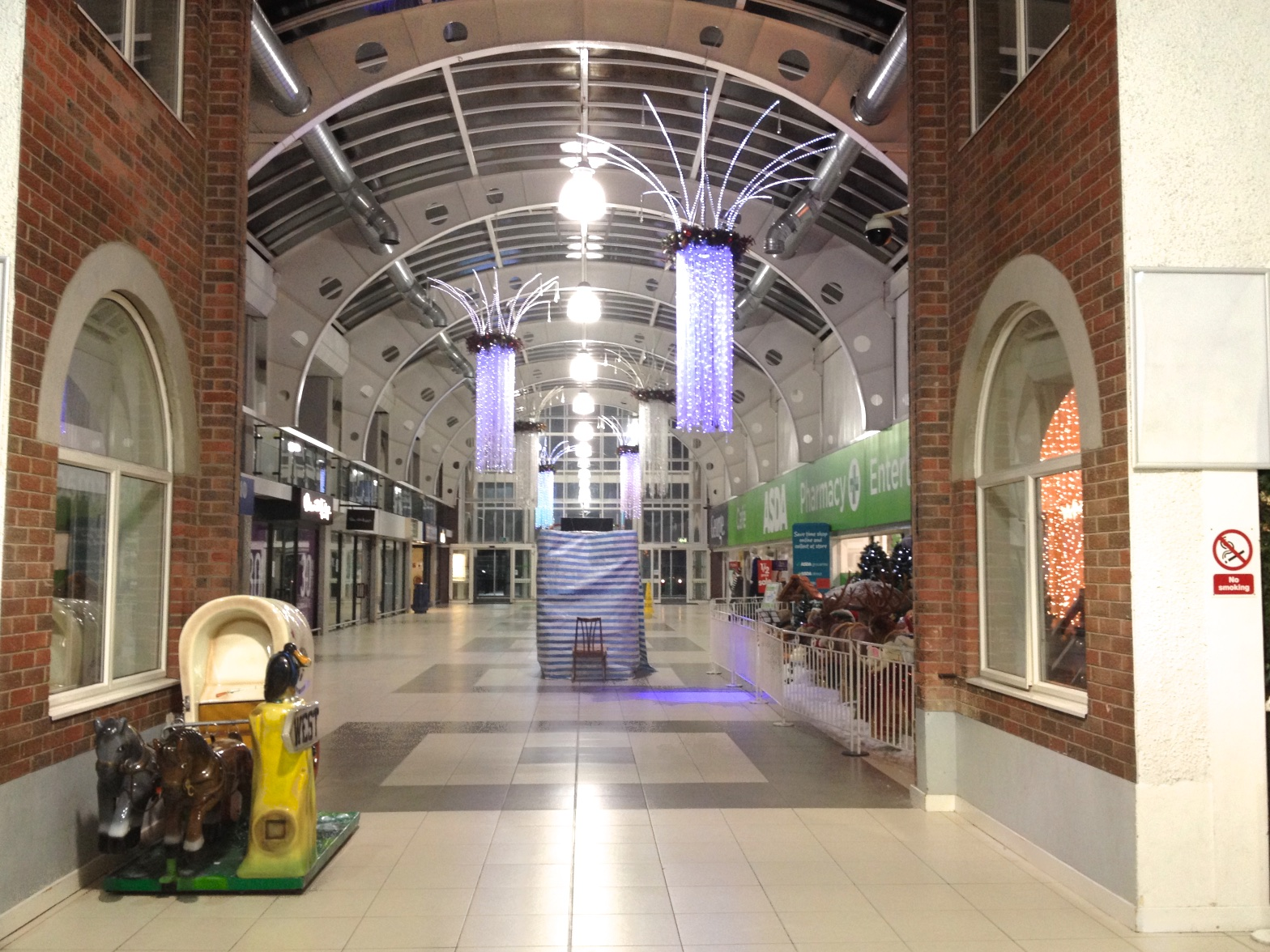
The interior of Dunmail Park looking back toward the entrance. Asda is to the right, other shops to the left. The cinema is directly behind the camera.

Dunmail Park has 475 car parking spaces available for visitors. It is served by several bus routes along the A596, which run to several locations, including Workington and Whitehaven to the south, and Maryport, Aspatria, Wigton, and Carlisle to the north and east. The number 60 bus, operated by local company Reay's, runs from Workington to Skinburness, and calls at Maryport, Allonby, Dubmill, Mawbray, Beckfoot, Blitterlees, and Silloth-on-Solway, providing residents of these smaller communities a public transportation link to the shopping centre.

=== Workington North railway station ===
Following the 2009 flooding in Cumbria, which saw several road bridges in and around Workington destroyed, a temporary railway station, Workington North, was built on the opposite side of the A596 from Dunmail Park. In addition to regular services along the Cumbrian Coast Line, an hourly shuttle service was commissioned between Maryport and Workington. However, Workington North railway station closed in October 2010, after slightly less than a year of operation. The nearest railway station to Dunmail Park is now the main Workington railway station.
