= Bevil Mabey =

English businessman (1916 – 2010)

Bevil Guy Mabey
- Born: 16 April 1916; Richmond, England
- Died: 27 April 2010 (aged 94); West Wittering, England
- Education: Tonbridge School; St Catharine's College, Cambridge
- Occupation: Businessman
- Title: director Mabey Group
- Term: 1946–2007
- Predecessor: Guy Mabey
- Successor: David Mabey
- Spouse: June Penelope Peck
- Children: 6

Bevil Guy Mabey CBE (16 April 1916 – 27 April 2010) was an English businessman who expanded the Mabey Group of engineering businesses, developing a modular steel bridge that could be quickly erected, and which became the successor to the wartime Bailey bridge.

== Early life ==
Mabey was born in Richmond, North Yorkshire, one of three children (two boys – Bevil was the youngest – and one girl) born to Guy Mabey, the founder in 1923 of a builders merchant, Mabey & Johnson. Bevil Mabey was educated at Tonbridge School and, from 1935, at St Catharine's College, Cambridge, where he read anthropology, archaeology and history. A keen rower, Mabey rowed in eights and fours, and enjoyed sculling, winning the Junior-Senior Sculls Cup at Marlow Regatta in 1937.

His brother Dennis joined the RAF Volunteer Reserve but was killed in action in November 1939. Bevil Mabey first joined the Royal Signals then the Royal Army Service Corps, rising to the rank of Major. During World War II, he served in France, North Africa, Sicily, Italy, Yugoslavia and Greece. In Italy, Mabey was impressed by the speed of construction of Bailey bridges used at Monte Cassino.

== Mabey & Johnson ==
After the war, he joined his father's construction business, Mabey & Johnson, in 1946 (taking over the business following his father's death in 1951). He started to buy Bailey bridge components to sell to contractors, before developing a steel modular bridge package for use as highway structures. His design was lighter, with fewer components, had twice the loading capability, and could be built to longer spans. and with a much longer life.

98m Mabey Logistic Support Bridge built by the Romanian Engineer Battalion. Construction time 6 days, completed on 6 July 1996.

These were extensively deployed in rough terrain in developing countries, and have been used for military purposes, helping British, US and Nato troops establish lines of communication in offensive and peacekeeping operations. For example, the Mabey Logistic Support Bridge was used in UN relief operations in Bosnia, Iraq and Afghanistan.

Mabey bridges have also been supplied for UK domestic emergency purposes; in one week in November 2009, a 50m-span bridge was constructed to span the River Derwent and reconnect the Cumbria town of Workington after the Northside Bridge collapsed during floods.

Mabey & Johnson also built several permanent steel box-girder bridges, after acquiring the South Wales-based Fairfield shipbuilding and engineering company. Its heavier steel fabricating capabilities helped Mabey build the Erskine Bridge over the River Clyde in Glasgow and the Avonmouth Bridge, and sections of the Humber Bridge, the Britannia Bridge in Anglesey and the City Bridge in Newport. Overseas, the company also built highway bridges and flyovers in Central America, the Caribbean and the Far East, and established a US-based company, Mabey Bridge Inc, in Baltimore, Maryland in 1989. The company won six Queen's Awards for Export Achievement (in 1973, 1978, 1982, 1987, 1998 and 2002).

=== Corruption ===
Mabey's final years as director of the company (he resigned as a director of the company in December 2007) saw allegations of corruption start to emerge. In 2005, Mabey & Johnson was accused of making excessive profits in aid projects in the Philippines, building what critics described as "bridges to nowhere". Further allegations of corruption, relating to sales in Jamaica, the Dominican Republic and Panama, surfaced in January 2008, after which Mabey Group admitted it may have paid bribes to the regime of Saddam Hussein in order to win business in Iraq, under the Oil-for-Food Programme. In September 2009, Mabey & Johnson became the first major British company to be convicted of foreign bribery after admitting it had systematically paid bribes around the world to win contracts. The firm was ordered to pay more than £6.5m, including fines and reparations to foreign governments.

In February 2011, Mabey & Johnson sales director and shareholder David Mabey (Bevil Mabey's only son) was jailed for eight months, and disqualified from acting as a company director for two years, for his role in making $420,000 (£258,000) of illegal payments to Iraqi officials.

== Philanthropy and personal life ==
Mabey was appointed CBE in the 1984 New Year Honours for services to export, and remained a director of the company until December 2007. A noted philanthropist, he founded charitable trusts in the UK, the Philippines and Central America, and funded building projects at Tonbridge School and St Catharine's College (including re-equipment of its Boat Club with several boats).

He lived most of his later life in West Wittering in West Sussex. His wife Penny (with whom he had a son and five daughters) predeceased him in 2002; Mabey died at home on 27 April 2010, and a funeral was held on 7 May 2010 at St Peter and St Paul Church, West Wittering.
