= Sibbick =

Sibbick is a surname. Notable people with the surname include:

- John Sibbick (born 1949), British illustrater
- Lucy Sibbick, British special effects make-up artist
- Toby Sibbick (born 1999), British footballer

== See also ==
- Siddick, town in Cumbria, England
