= Flimby railway station =

Railway station in Cumbria, England

Flimby
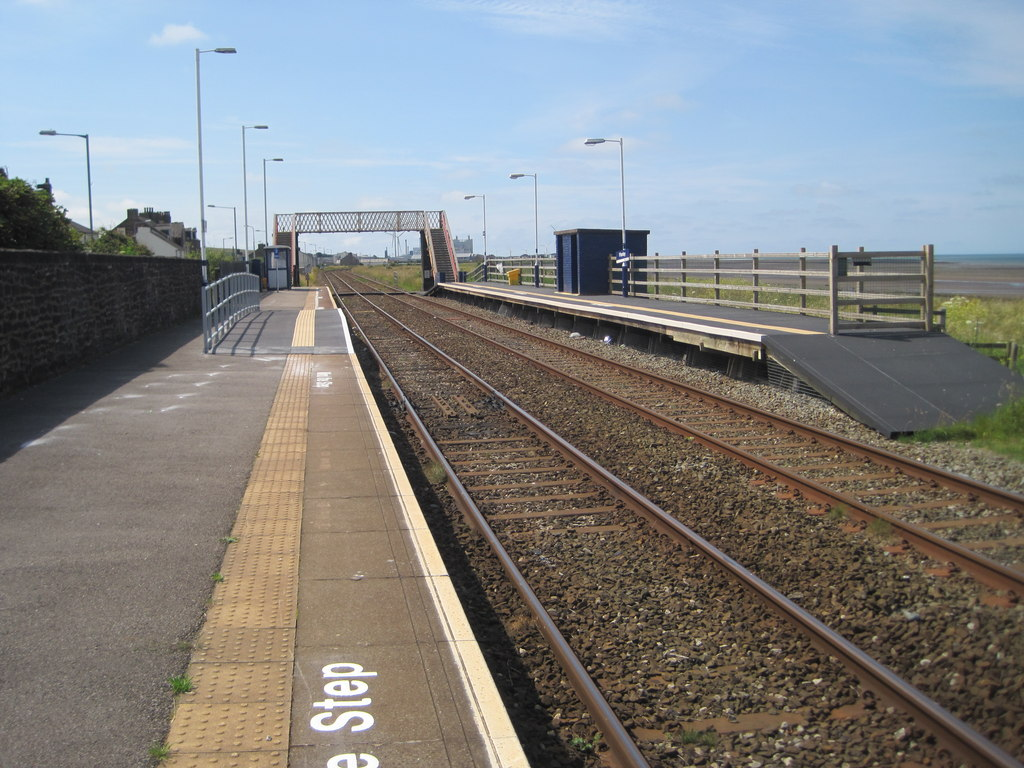

General information
- Location: Flimby, Cumberland; England
- Coordinates: 54°41′24″N 3°31′14″W
- Grid reference: NY020338
- Owner: Network Rail
- Manager: Northern Trains
- Platforms: 2
- Tracks: 2

Other information
- Station code: FLM
- Classification: DfT category F2

History
- Original company: Whitehaven Junction Railway
- Pre-grouping: London and North Western Railway
- Post-grouping: London, Midland and Scottish Railway; British Rail (London Midland Region)

Key dates
- 19 January 1846: Opened

Passengers
- 2021/22: ▲10,502
- 2022/23: ▲10,574
- 2023/24: ▲12,458
- 2024/25: ▲17,316
- 2025/26: ▲20,332
Location
- Location within the former Allerdale Borough Location within Cumbria
Notes
- Passenger statistics from the Office of Rail and Road

Flimby railway station serves the coastal village of Flimby in Cumbria, England. It is on the Cumbrian Coast Line, which runs between Carlisle and Barrow-in-Furness. It is owned by Network Rail and managed by Northern Trains.

== History ==
Flimby railway station was opened by the Whitehaven Junction Railway in 1846 along with the rest of the stations on the line from Maryport to Whitehaven Bransty.

== Facilities ==
The station is unstaffed and has no buildings other than a footbridge and waiting shelters. Tickets can be purchased from the ticket machine. The two platforms are of differing construction - the southbound is stone whereas the northbound one is wooden. Step-free access is only available for southbound passengers, as the footbridge does not have ramps. Train running information is provided by telephone and timetable posters, with digital information screens due to be commissioned here in the winter of 2019.

== Services ==
There is generally an hourly service northbound to Carlisle and southbound to Whitehaven with most trains going onward to Barrow-in-Furness (no late evening service operates south of Whitehaven). It was a request stop in the past, but in the current (winter 2025 timetable), all trains are scheduled to call here.

Train operator Northern introduced a regular through service to Barrow via the coast at the May 2018 timetable change - the first such service south of Whitehaven since 1976. Services run approximately hourly from late morning until early evening, with later trains terminating at Whitehaven. This represents a major upgrade on the former infrequent service of four per day each way to/from Whitehaven, only that previously operated.

In the aftermath of the November 2009 Great Britain and Ireland floods Flimby saw its passenger numbers soar because of the closure of road transport between the north and south of the town of Workington. Additional peak-time services were added for 26–27 November, followed by a new hourly shuttle service northbound to Maryport and southbound to Workington. This shuttle train was timetabled to always stop at Flimby, briefly reversing its status as a request-only stop. This operated between 30 November 2009 and 28 May 2010. Workington North railway station, a temporary station, opened south of Flimby on 30 November 2009, reducing the pressure on trains at Flimby. In addition, all services between Workington, Workington North, Flimby and Maryport were free of charge for this period.

In January 2014, services through the station had to be suspended for several days following flood damage to a 200yd (180m) section of track south of the station caused by strong winds and tidal surges (the railway runs very close to the seashore at this point). The line was closed for a week whilst repairs were carried out.

== Accidents ==
On 1 February 1858, near Flimby colliery which is around a mile north of Flimby railway station, a coal train from Maryport was struck by a scheduled mixed goods and passenger train. It was said that the sharp curve on the line prevented the drivers from seeing each other. The crew of the two trains jumped out and only the fireman of the passenger train was hurt. It was found that the two drivers were not to blame and it was miscommunication between the signalman near the colliery and the Maryport telegraph clerk that caused the clerk to tell the driver of the coal train to proceed. Whilst the clerk was away a third message came through, to which the son of the signalman at the colliery replied "GD" meaning "good", and so the signalman allowed the passenger train to proceed, thus causing the accident.

Preceding station	National Rail	Following station
Maryport	Northern Trains; Cumbrian Coast Line	Workington
	Historical railways	
Maryport	Northern Rail; Cumbrian Coast Line	Workington North
Maryport	London and North Western Railway; Whitehaven Junction Railway	Siddick Junction
