= Listed buildings in Maryport =

Maryport is a civil parish in the Cumberland unitary authority area of Cumbria, England. It contains 58 listed buildings that are recorded in the National Heritage List for England. Of these, two are listed at Grade II*, the middle of the three grades, and the others are at Grade II, the lowest grade. The parish contains the town of Maryport and the village of Flimby. The site of Maryport has been a haven since the Roman era. It was developed as a coal port in 1748–49 when the town was laid out on a grid plan, and the town grew further following the arrival of the railway in 1845. The work of the port declined during the 20th century. Most of the listed buildings are houses, shops and public houses in the town dating from the 18th and 19th centuries. The other listed buildings include a medieval pele tower, farmhouses, a naval club, a lighthouse, churches, and a museum that originated as a naval gunnery training centre.

== Key ==
Grade	Criteria
II*	Particularly important buildings of more than special interest
II	Buildings of national importance and special interest

== Buildings ==
Name and location	Photograph	Date	Notes	Grade
Netherhall; 54.71580°N 3.48862°W	—	Medieval	This was a mansion that incorporated a pele tower. The house was abandoned in the 1960s, it was damaged by fire, and demolished in 1979; all that is left now is the tower. This is in sandstone, mainly Roman dressed stones. The site is also a scheduled monument.	II*
81, 83 and 85 Main Street; 54.70701°N 3.48317°W	—	Late 17th century	A row of three houses in two storeys with a string course and a slate roof. They contain one mullioned window, six small square windows, and modern casements. The windows and doorways have chamfered surrounds and hood moulds. At the rear are single-storey outshuts.	II
Bank End Farmhouse; 54.73123°N 3.47971°W	—	1716	A rendered farmhouse with a stone slate roof. It has two storeys and two bays, with a single-bay, single-storey extension to the right, and a two-storey extension at the rear. The windows are sashes with chamfered reveals, and above the doorway is the date. To the left of the house is a single-storey store with a catslide roof, and there is a further extension beyond that.	II
73 Main Street; 54.70739°N 3.48268°W	—	18th century	A rendered house with rusticated quoins, a moulded eaves cornice, and a pantile roof. It has two storeys and three bays. In the upper floor at the front are three sash windows; the other windows and the door are modern. Attached to the right of the house is a barn dating from 1721. It is in rubble with a slate roof, and contains a segmental-headed cart entrance and ventilation slits.	II
3 North Quay; 54.71606°N 3.50157°W		18th century	The house is pebbledashed and it has a roof with coped gables. There are two storeys and four bays. In the centre is a stone porch with pilasters, a triglyph frieze, and a small pediment with modillions; this is flanked by a modern window on each side. The door is approached by four steps with iron railings, There are four windows in the upper floor.	II
8 Senhouse Street; 54.71484°N 3.50046°W	—	18th century	A rendered house with a stone slate roof, in two storeys and three bays. The windows have chamfered reveals, and above the central doorway is a small cornice on brackets.	II
Grange Farmhouse; 54.68590°N 3.51549°W	—	18th century	The farmhouse is rendered, and has two storeys and two doorways. The doorways and windows have stone surrounds.	II
Public House, 11 Senhouse Street; 54.71450°N 3.50033°W	—	18th century	The public house is rendered with a stone slate roof, in two storeys and five bays. The windows are sashes with cemented surrounds.	II
Royal Naval Club; 54.71481°N 3.50206°W	—	18th century (probable)	The building is rendered and has a stone slate roof with coped gables. In the upper floor are six sash windows. The lower floor contains modern windows, a modern doorway, and a pair of windows in a former doorway with a cornice.	II
6, 7 and 8 South Quay; 54.71471°N 3.50200°W	—	1763	Originally offices and warehouses, later divided into three dwellings, they are in stuccoed cobble and sandstone rubble, and have a roof mainly in Cumbrian slate. There are two storeys, and each house has one bay. Above the doorway of No. 7 is an inscribed and dated lintel. Over the ground floor windows are moulded cornices, those of Nos. 7 and 8 being bracketed. The windows are of differing styles.	II
Flimby Hall; 54.68703°N 3.51558°W	—	1766	A roughcast house with a moulded and bracketed sandstone cornice, a parapet, and a slate roof. There are three storeys and five bays. The windows are sashes with moulded architraves.	II*
15 Bridge Street; 54.71467°N 3.50230°W	—	Late 18th century	Originally a single-bay cottage, it has been extended both sides. The building is stuccoed with a Cumbrian slate roof. The left bay has one storey, the middle bay has two storeys and an attic, and the right bay, which projects forward, has two storeys. Most of the windows are sashes, other than the attic window in the middle bay, which is a casement.	II
16 Bridge Street; 54.71456°N 3.50234°W	—	Late 18th century	This was originally the New Crown Inn, and has been converted for residential use. It is rendered over cobble and sandstone rubble, and has a Cumbrian slate roof. The south front has three storeys and three bays and contains windows of varying types. The west front has a gabled section containing a doorway, and a two-storey two-bay section to the left; these sections contain sash windows.	II
28 and 30 High Street; 54.71364°N 3.50020°W	—	Late 18th century	A pair of roughcast houses on a coped plinth, with rusticated quoins, a coped gable to the right, and an eaves cornice. There are three storeys, the windows are sashes, and those in No. 28 have three lights. The doorways are approached by steps. The doorway to No. 28 has pilasters with moulded capitals, an open modillion pediment, and a semicircular fanlight with Gothick tracery. The doorway to No. 30 has chamfered reveals and a rectangular fanlight, and there is a passage door to the right.	II
1 New Crown Yard; 54.71454°N 3.50218°W	—	Late 18th century	Originally two houses, later combined into a single dwelling, it is in rendered cobble and sandstone rubble, and has a Cumbrian blue slate roof. There are three storeys and four bays. The windows are sashes, those in the top floor being mock sashes.	II
1 North Quay; 54.71617°N 3.50181°W		Late 18th century	A rendered house that has a Welsh slate roof with coped gables. It has two storeys and a symmetrical front of three bays. The doorway and windows have plain stone surrounds, and the windows are sashes.	II
Ewanrigg Hall; 54.70360°N 3.48459°W	—	Late 18th century	Originally a mansion, later reduced in size to form a farmhouse and associated buildings. The farmhouse is in sandstone with a slate roof, and has two storeys and three bays. The ground floor has three arcades and a door with a fanlight. The windows are sashes. To the left are farm buildings, retaining some features surviving from the mansion.	II
2 and 3 South Quay; 54.71458°N 3.50204°W	—	1785	This originated as a harbour building, and was later converted for other uses. It is in rendered cobble and sandstone rubble with sandstone dressings, and it has a Cumbrian slate roof. There are three storeys with cellars and three bays, with a fourth bay added to the right in the 19th century. Above the two doorways are inscribed lintels, and over the left doorway were warehouse doors, the lower converted into a window, and the upper blocked. The windows are sashes, and in the right bay is a segmental-arched carriage entry.	II
The Priory; 54.71624°N 3.49738°W	—	Late 18th or early 19th century	A rendered house with a moulded cornice and a slate roof, in two storeys and four bays. Th doorway has pilasters, a moulded cornice, and a rectangular fanlight, and to the right is an arched carriage entrance. The windows are sashes with moulded surrounds, the window above the doorway being blocked.	II
1 Camp Street; 54.71732°N 3.49675°W	—	Early 19th century	A rendered house in three storeys and two bays. The doorway has pilasters, an entablature, and a cornice, and the windows are sashes.	II
84 Crosby Street; 54.71475°N 3.49800°W	—	Early 19th century	A shop with two storeys, the upper storey being rendered. The lower storey contains a shop front with two windows, two doorways, an entablature and a cornice. Flanking the doors and windows are four twisted columns. Above each door is a rectangular fanlight.	II
120 Crosby Street and 45 Kirkby Street; 54.71568°N 3.49740°W	—	Early 19th century	A pair of rendered houses on a corner site, both of which have three storeys, and No. 120 Crosby Street also has a basement. There are two bays facing each street. On the curved corner, steps lead up to a doorway with pilasters and a fanlight. The windows are sashes, those in the middle floor having cornices. No. 120 Crosby Street has a basement door and window, and No. 45 Kirkby Street has a plain doorway.	II
11 Eaglesfield Street; 54.71641°N 3.49772°W	—	Early 19th century	A rendered house with an eaves modillion cornice and a stone slate roof. There are two storeys with a basement, and one bay. Three steps with handrails lead to the doorway, which has pilasters, a cornice with modillions on carved brackets, and a semicircular fanlight. In front of the basement area are iron railings.	II
17 Eaglesfield Street; 54.71633°N 3.49746°W	—	Early 19th century	A stone house with rusticated quoins and a stone slate roof. There are two storeys with a basement and an attic, and two bays. Steps lead up to a round-headed doorway with a keystone, impost blocks, and a semicircular fanlight. To the right of the main doorway is an entry door. The windows are sashes, two of which are in gabled dormers that break the eaves, and there is also a basement window.	II
72 High Street; 54.71478°N 3.49958°W	—	Early 19th century	A rendered shop with three storeys and two bays. In the ground floor is a shop front with pilasters and a cornice, and above are sash windows in both floors.	II
102 High Street; 54.71552°N 3.49900°W	—	Early 19th century	The house is rendered and has a stone slate roof with a coped gable. There are two storeys with a basement, and two bays. Steps with iron railings lead up to a doorway with a rectangular fanlight. There are iron railings protecting the basement area, and the windows are sashes.	II
104 High Street; 54.71558°N 3.49900°W	—	Early 19th century	A rendered house with a cornice and end pilasters. It has three storeys with a basement, and two bays. Steps lead up to a doorway with pilasters, an entablature, a cornice, and a fanlight. There are iron railings protecting the basement area, and the windows are sashes.	II
107 and 109 High Street, 17 Kirkby Street; 54.71588°N 3.49848°W	—	Early 19th century	Three pebbledashed houses with sash windows, in two storeys and attics. Nos. 107 and 109 High Street have basements, one bay each, steps leading up to shared doorways under a pediment, and No. 107 has a dormer. No. 17 Kirkby Street, on a corner site, has two bays on each front. On the Kirkby Street front is a coped gable, and a central doorway that has pilasters, a modillion cornice, an open pediment, and a round-headed fanlight with Gothick tracery.	II
2 King Street; 54.71569°N 3.50077°W		Early 19th century	Originally the King's Arms public house, it is rendered with rusticated quoins and an eaves cornice. There are three storeys and three bays, with a single-storey three-bay extension to the right. In the ground floor are two arched windows, a central arched doorway, and a blocked arched doorway to the left, with a continuous hood mould above them. In the upper floors are sash windows with moulded surrounds.	II
47 and 49 Kirkby Street; 54.71560°N 3.49717°W	—	Early 19th century	A pair of houses with rusticated quoins to the right, a pilaster to the left, and an eaves cornice. There are three storeys with basements, and each house has one bay. Five steps with iron handrails lead up to a joint doorway, and the windows are sashes.	II
57 Kirkby Street; 54.71551°N 3.49677°W	—	Early 19th century	The house is rendered with an eaves cornice and a stone slate roof. There are three storeys and two bays. Most of the windows are sashes. Adjoining the doorway is an entry door, both with stone surrounds, and above the door is an ornamental fanlight.	II
13 Senhouse Street; 54.71443°N 3.50020°W	—	Early 19th century	A shop with a stone slate roof, in three storeys and two bays. In the ground floor is a shop front with a cornice and a fanlight over the door. Above the windows are sashes in chamfered reveals.	II
67 Wood Street; 54.71482°N 3.49680°W	—	Early 19th century	A sandstone house on a plinth with a string course, a moulded and modillioned cornice, and a hipped Welsh slate roof. There are two storeys and a symmetrical front of three bays. Steps lead to the entrance that has three-quarter Doric columns with a moulded and modillioned entablature, and a semicircular fanlight with ornamental tracery. The windows are sashes.	II
Castle Hill Education Settlement; 54.71265°N 3.50049°W	—	Early 19th century	The building is rendered with end pilasters, and has a slate roof with coped gables. There are two storeys and five bays, with a small single-bay extension to the left. On the front is a porch with a moulded cornice, and steps leading up to the door above which is a fanlight. The windows on the front are sashes, and at the rear is a bow window.	II
Gate piers and gates, Castle Hill Education Settlement; 54.71282°N 3.50056°W	—	Early 19th century	The gate piers are in rusticated stone, and the gates are iron.	II
Crown Inn; 54.70939°N 3.47864°W		Early 19th century	The public house is in sandstone with end pilasters and a double span roof of Welsh slate. There are two storeys, with two windows in the ground floor and three sash windows in the upper floor. Attached to the main part is a storage building in two storeys with a hoist door in the upper storey.	II
Flimby Cottage; 54.69405°N 3.51649°W	—	Early 19th century	A lodge in Gothick style, pebbledashed with a hipped slate roof. There are two storeys and three bays, with a gabled wing on the left. In the ground floor is a central pointed-arched window flanked by larger arched windows with Gothick glazing. The upper floor has a central oval window flanked by arched windows. In the wing is another Gothick window and a doorway.	II
Middle Tap Bar; 54.71477°N 3.50013°W		Early 19th century	A rendered public house with a modillioned and moulded eaves cornice. It has three storeys with a basement, and two bays. In the ground floor is a continuous cornice below which is an oriel window, two doorways and a shop window, and in the upper floors are sash windows. (Note: This was previously called the Board Vaults Public House.)	II
Gate piers, Netherhall; 54.71646°N 3.49068°W	—	Early 19th century	The four piers stand at the entrance of the drive to the former Netherhall. They have a square plan, they are panelled, and have plinth bases and pyramidal caps.	II
Lodge, Netherhall; 54.71644°N 3.49047°W	—	Early 19th century	The lodge is in sandstone with rusticated quoins and a hipped Welsh slate roof. It is in a single storey. Facing the drive is a portico that has four Roman Doric columns with a moulded entablature, and it is flanked by windows with moulded surrounds.	II
Senhouse Arms Hotel; 54.71622°N 3.49675°W	—	Early 19th century	The building is stuccoed, and has three storeys and attics. There are four bays on the front and three on the side. The doorways on the front and the side are approached by steps, with railings on the side, and each has a stone surround, a cornice and a fanlight. The windows are sashes, and in the gable on the side is a round-headed window. (Note: Street View in July 2011 appears to show the building in private use rather than as a hotel.)	II
The Convent; 54.71591°N 3.49757°W	—	Early 19th century	A rendered house with a modillion cornice, a moulded parapet, and rusticated quoins to the right. There are two storeys and three bays. Steps with railings lead up to the central doorway that has attached columns with entasis and grooved capitals, a modillion pediment, and a semicircular fanlight. The windows are sashes with moulded sills.	II
The Vicarage; 54.71716°N 3.49693°W	—	Early 19th century	A stuccoed house on a plinth with moulded coping. It has pilasters, a cornice, a parapet, and a Welsh slate roof, and it is in two storeys. To the left is a slightly projecting two-storey rectangular bay window with three lights in each storey. To the right are three bays containing a central Ionic porch with a cornice and an entablature, and a doorway with a rectangular fanlight. The windows are sashes.	II
Top Tap public house 54.71473°N 3.49950°W	—	Early 19th century	A stuccoed public house with a stone slate roof, in two storeys and five bays. In the ground floor is, from the left, a doorway and a window, a public house front that has a central doorway with pilasters, a bracketed fascia and cornice, and a fanlight; this is flanked by windows. There is then an entry doorway and a shop front with pilasters. In the upper floor are sash windows with cornices. (Note: This was formerly called the Broom Vaults Public House.)	II
1 Fleming Place; 54.71707°N 3.49732°W	—	Early to mid 19th century	The house is rendered, it has end pilasters and a cornice, and is in three storeys. The doorway has pilasters and a rectangular fanlight, and the windows are sashes. On the side is an original stone street sign.	II
2 Fleming Place; 54.71714°N 3.49767°W	—	Early to mid 19th century	A rendered house on a coped plinth, with end pilasters and a cornice. It has two storeys with an attic, the entrance front has three bays, and there are two bays on the side. The central doorway is approached by three steps, and it has pilasters, a cornice, and a rectangular fanlight. The windows are sashes, and there is an iron area guard.	II
23 Fleming Square; 54.71671°N 3.49645°W	—	Early to mid 19th century	A rendered house on a plinth, with end pilasters, an eaves cornice, and a Welsh slate roof. It has two storeys with attics, and three bays. The main doorway has a porch with Doric columns, an entablature, a cornice, and a round-headed fanlight. There is a smaller doorway to the right with a rectangular fanlight. The ground floor windows have three lights and pediments on brackets. In the upper floor the central window has a round head and a pediment; the outer windows have segmental heads and moulded cornices. In the roof are two small dormers.	II
24 and 24A Fleming Square; 54.71660°N 3.49652°W	—	1834	A pair of rendered houses on a plinth, with rusticated quoins in two storeys. There is a central carriage entrance with a rusticated surround and a dated keystone. There are two doorways and sash windows, two in the ground floor and four above.	II
Alba House; 54.71717°N 3.49807°W	—	1842	A rendered house on a plinth that has angle pilasters with moulded capitals, a string course at the level of the upper floor sills, and a plain cornice. There are two storeys and three bays. The central doorway has Greek Doric columns, and steps with an iron handrail lead up to the door that has a fanlight.	II
Lighthouse; 54.71693°N 3.50759°W		1846	The disused lighthouse is about 36 metres (118 ft) high. It has an octagonal sandstone base with a Tudor arched panel on each face and a cornice. The rest of the lighthouse is in cast iron. On the base is a stepped plinth and an octagonal column with a splayed base. At the top is an octagonal lantern with a flat cap, a finial, and a weathervane.	II
St Mary's Church; 54.71522°N 3.49476°W		1847	The oldest part of the church is the tower, the rest being rebuilt in 1892 by J. H. Martindale. The church is in sandstone with freestone dressings and a slate roof. It consists of a west tower, a nave, aisles, north and south porches, a chancel, and a southeast vestry. The tower has four stages with diagonal buttresses, it incorporates a porch, and has a clock face on the west front. The bell openings are three stepped lancets, and at the top is an embattled parapet with corner pinnacles. Most of the church is in Decorated style.	II
15 Eaglesfield Street; 54.71635°N 3.49759°W	—	Mid 19th century	The house is rendered and has two storeys, a basement, and attics. To the left is a two-storey canted bay window, and a doorway approached by three steps, which has pilasters, an entablature, a cornice, and a rectangular fanlight. To the right of this is a window with three round-headed lights, and a carriage entrance with a segmental head. In the upper floor are two sashes with moulded surrounds and pediments, and in the roof are four gabled dormers.	II
4 Fleming Place; 54.71723°N 3.49721°W	—	19th century	A rendered house with rusticated quoins, a string course, and a hipped slate roof. It has two storeys and a symmetrical front of three bays. In the centre is a porch with a cornice on brackets, and this is flanked by canted bay windows. In the upper floor are sash windows with moulded surrounds and rusticated keystone.	II
Station Hotel; 54.70857°N 3.50010°W		Mid 19th century	A rendered building on a plinth, with a string course and a roof of asbestos pantiles. It has three storeys, and three bays on each front. In the ground floor of the entrance front is a central doorway flanked by modern windows. Elsewhere the windows are sashes, and there are some blocked windows.	II
The Cottage; 54.71736°N 3.49779°W	—	Mid 19th century	A stuccoed villa with two storeys and three bays, and a two-storey wing. The ground floor is rusticated, the eaves are bracketed, and there is a string course at the level of the upper floor sills. In the centre is a porch with paired pilasters and a rectangular fanlight. The windows are sashes, those in the ground floor having moulded surrounds and cornices with moulded brackets.	II
The Cumberland; 54.71316°N 3.50015°W	—	1851	The stuccoed house is in Greek Revival style, and has a moulded cornice and a blocking course. There are two storeys and five bays. The central doorway has fluted Doric columns, a moulded entablature, and steps leading up to a door with an ornamental fanlight. The windows are sashes with reveals.	II
Christ Church; 54.71552°N 3.50091°W		1872	The church is in red sandstone with Welsh slate roofs, and is in Early English style. It consists of a nave, a south aisle, a chancel with an apse, a northeast vestry, and a west steeple. The steeple has a tower with three stages, a south doorway, circular windows in the first stage, and a broach spire with clock faces on all sides and a cross finial. The windows are lancets. It has links to the artists L. S. Lowry and Sheila Fell. It closed in 2013 but there are plans in 2021 to convert it to an arts centre.	II
Senhouse Roman Museum; 54.72125°N 3.49576°W		1885	Originally a naval gunnery training centre, later converted into a museum, it is in sandstone with dressings of Portland stone and it has a green slate roof. The building consists of a semicircular two-storey tower, two single-storey ranges, and a short cross-wing at the end of the south range. The ranges have plinths, pilasters, and friezes, and the tower has an arcaded corbel table, a projecting upper storey, a cornice, and a semi-conical roof with a finial.	II
Former Dixons jeweller's shop 54.71387°N 3.49715°W	—	c. 1891	The shop is in rusticated red sandstone, and has two storeys and an attic. In the ground floor is a three-bay timber shopfront. In the centre is a three-sided canted shop window, flanked by recessed splayed entrances. The middle bay has a plinth and a stall riser, the window has decorative cast iron mullions and capitals, and there are panelled timber security shutters. Above the shopfront is a decorative painted fascia. In the upper floor is a canted bay window with a moulded sill and lintel, and a cornice, It is framed by strip pilasters rising to a moulded eaves cornice flanking a square-headed dormer. Inside, many of the shop fittings have been retained.	II

== Notes and references ==
=== Sources ===
- Historic England, "Netherhall, Maryport (1137621)", National Heritage List for England
- Historic England, "Netherhall, Maryport (1007092)", National Heritage List for England
- Historic England, "Nos. 81, 83 and 85 Main Street, Maryport (1144682)", National Heritage List for England
- Historic England, "Bank End Farmhouse, Maryport (1144669)", National Heritage List for England
- Historic England, "No. 73 Main Street, Maryport (1137605)", National Heritage List for England
- Historic England, "No. 3 North Quay, Maryport (1137649)", National Heritage List for England
- Historic England, "No. 8 Senhouse Street, Maryport (1137674)", National Heritage List for England
- Historic England, "Grange Farmhouse, Maryport (1327110)", National Heritage List for England
- Historic England, "Public House, 11 Senhouse Street, Maryport (1327134)", National Heritage List for England
- Historic England, "The Royal Naval Club, Maryport (1327135)", National Heritage List for England
- Historic England, "6, 7 and 8 South Quay, Maryport (1096129)", National Heritage List for England
- Historic England, "Flimby Hall, Maryport (1137687)", National Heritage List for England
- Historic England, "No. 15 Bridge Street, Maryport (1096130)", National Heritage List for England
- Historic England, "No. 16 Bridge Street, Maryport (1096131)", National Heritage List for England
- Historic England, "Nos. 28 and 30 High Street, Maryport (1327111)", National Heritage List for England
- Historic England, "No. 1 New Crown Yard, Maryport (1096126)", National Heritage List for England
- Historic England, "No. 1 North Quay, Maryport (1327133)", National Heritage List for England
- Historic England, "Ewanrigg Hall, Maryport (1144672)", National Heritage List for England
- Historic England, "2 and 3 South Quay, Maryport (1096167)", National Heritage List for England
- Historic England, "The Priory, Maryport (1144671)", National Heritage List for England
- Historic England, "No. 1 Camp Street, Maryport (1137469)", National Heritage List for England
- Historic England, "Nos. 45 Kirkby Street and 122 Crosby Street, Maryport (1144670)", National Heritage List for England
- Historic England, "No. 84 Crosby Street, Maryport (1137485)", National Heritage List for England
- Historic England, "No. 11 Eaglesfield Street, Maryport (1137490)", National Heritage List for England
- Historic England, "No. 17 Eaglesfield Street, Maryport (1312276)", National Heritage List for England
- Historic England, "No. 72 High Street, Maryport (1144677)", National Heritage List for England
- Historic England, "No. 102 High Street, Maryport (1312234)", National Heritage List for England
- Historic England, "No. 104 High Street, Maryport (1144678)", National Heritage List for England
- Historic England, "Nos. 107 and 109 High Street and 17 Kirkby Street, Maryport (1144676)", National Heritage List for England
- Historic England, "No. 2 King Street, Maryport (1144679)", National Heritage List for England
- Historic England, "Nos. 47 and 49 Kirkby Street, Maryport (1144680)", National Heritage List for England
- Historic England, "No. 57 Kirkby Street, Maryport (1137597)", National Heritage List for England
- Historic England, "No. 13 Senhouse Street, Maryport (1144646)", National Heritage List for England
- Historic England, "No. 67 Wood Street, Maryport (1327136)", National Heritage List for England
- Historic England, "Castle Hill Education Settlement, Maryport (1137553)", National Heritage List for England
- Historic England, "Gate piers and gates to Castle Hill Education Settlement, Maryport (1144675)", National Heritage List for England
- Historic England, "Crown Inn, Maryport (1137545)", National Heritage List for England
- Historic England, "Flimby Cottage, Maryport (1137670)", National Heritage List for England
- Historic England, "Board Vaults Public House, Maryport (1144647)", National Heritage List for England
- Historic England, "Gate piers to Netherhall, Maryport (1137639)", National Heritage List for England
- Historic England, "Lodge at Netherhall, Maryport (1144644)", National Heritage List for England
- Historic England, "Senhouse Arms Hotel, Maryport (1137507)", National Heritage List for England
- Historic England, "The Convent, Maryport (1312240)", National Heritage List for England
- Historic England, "The Vicarage, Maryport (1327109)", National Heritage List for England
- Historic England, "The Broom Vaults Public House, Maryport (1312232)", National Heritage List for England
- Historic England, "No. 1 Fleming Place, Maryport (1312289)", National Heritage List for England
- Historic England, "No. 2 Fleming Place, Maryport (1327108)", National Heritage List for England
- Historic England, "No. 23 Fleming Square, Maryport (1137539)", National Heritage List for England
- Historic England, "Nos. 24 and 24A Fleming Square, Maryport (1144674)", National Heritage List for England
- Historic England, "Alba House, Maryport (1137579)", National Heritage List for England
- Historic England, "The Lighthouse, Maryport (1144649)", National Heritage List for England
- Historic England, "Parish Church of St Mary, Maryport (1327106)", National Heritage List for England
- Historic England, "No. 15 Eaglesfield Street, Maryport (1327107)", National Heritage List for England
- Historic England, "No. 4 Fleming Place, Maryport (1144673)", National Heritage List for England
- Historic England, "Station Hotel, Maryport (1144681)", National Heritage List for England
- Historic England, "The Cottage, Maryport (1137531)", National Heritage List for England
- Historic England, "The Cumberland, Maryport (1137557)", National Heritage List for England
- Historic England, "Christ Church, Maryport (1470933)", National Heritage List for England
- Historic England, "The Battery, Senhouse Roman Museum, Maryport (1233301)", National Heritage List for England
- Historic England, "Former Dixons jeweller's shop with accommodation above, 79 Senhouse Street, Maryport (1490269)", National Heritage List for England
- Historic England, Listed Buildings
- Hyde, Matthew; Pevsner, Nikolaus (2010) [1967], Cumbria, The Buildings of England, New Haven and London: Yale University Press, ISBN 978-0-300-12663-1
