= Siddick =

Village in Cumbria, England

Coordinates: 54.6656°N 3.5500°W

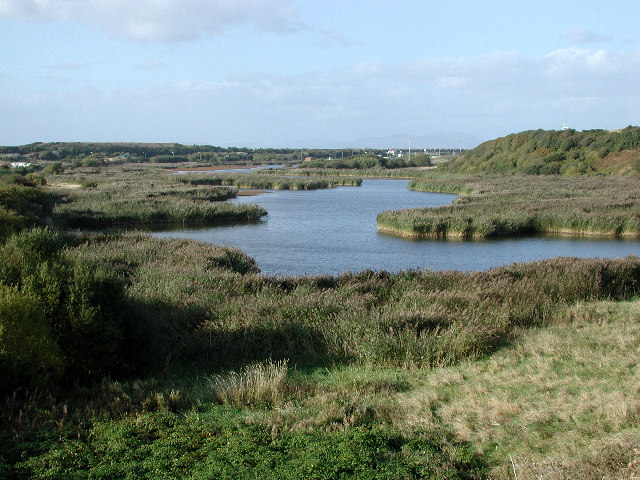
- Siddick Ponds Nature Reserve

- Location in Allerdale, Cumbria Location within Cumbria
- OS grid reference: NY000311
  - London: 260 mi (420 km) S
- Civil parish: Workington
- Unitary authority: Cumberland
- Ceremonial county: Cumbria
- Region: North West
- Country: England
- Sovereign state: United Kingdom
- Post town: WORKINGTON
- Postcode district: CA14
- Dialling code: 01900
- Police: Cumbria
- Fire: Cumbria
- Ambulance: North West
- UK Parliament: Whitehaven and Workington

Siddick is a village in Cumbria, England, historically part of Cumberland. It is situated on the A596 road, approximately 2 miles (3 km) north from the town of Workington. It lies within Workington civil parish.

As a coastal settlement on the Solway Firth (which is an inlet of the Irish Sea), fishing contributes to the local economy.

There is a large manufacturing area to the east of the village, with Swedish paper maker Iggesund Paperboard operating a large facility there. Eastman Chemical Company and Indorama Corporation used to own chemical plants in Siddick, but these have subsequently closed. To the south of the village is Dunmail Park shopping centre, where there is a multiplex cinema, a supermarket, and a number of other shops.

== Governance ==
Siddick is part of the Whitehaven and Workington constituency of the UK parliament.

For Local Government purposes it is administered as part of the Cumberland unitary authority.

Siddick has its own Parish Council; Workington Town Council.

== Siddick Ponds Nature Reserve ==
Siddick Ponds Nature Reserve is a protected area and Site of Special Scientific Interest to the south of the village. Ten thousand years ago the ponds were part of a delta in what is now the River Derwent. The name "Siddick" is believed to have come from "Siggit" or "Seagate", a racecourse formerly located close by. Coal was extracted from the St Helens pit nearby and affected the area; after the pit closed the land was reclaimed and replanted to create new wildlife habitats.
