= Flimby =

Coastal village in Cumbria, England

Coordinates: 54.686°N 3.513°W

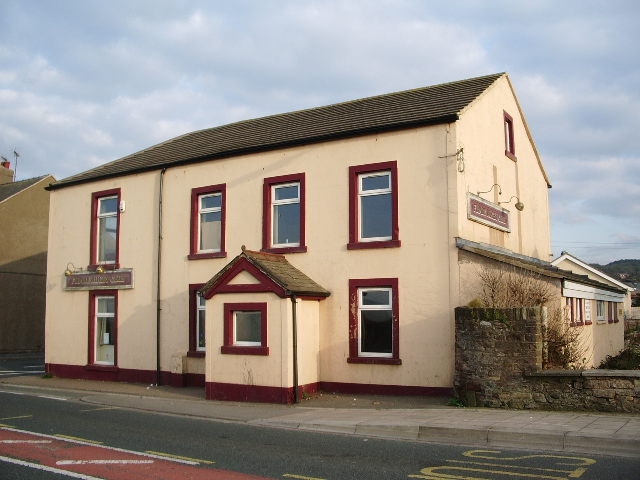
- Flimby Rugby Club

- Location in Allerdale Location within Cumbria
- Population: 1,718 (2021)
- OS grid reference: NY0233
- Civil parish: Maryport
- Unitary authority: Cumberland
- Ceremonial county: Cumbria
- Region: North West
- Country: England
- Sovereign state: United Kingdom
- Post town: MARYPORT
- Postcode district: CA15
- Dialling code: 01900
- Police: Cumbria
- Fire: Cumbria
- Ambulance: North West
- UK Parliament: Whitehaven and Workington

Flimby is a coastal village in Cumbria, England. Formerly a civil parish, it now forms part of the parish of Maryport within the district of Cumberland. Historically, the area was part of the county of Cumberland. The village lies on the Cumbrian Coast Line railway between Maryport and Workington. At the 2021 census, the parish had a population of 1,718.

== Governance ==
The village is in the parliamentary constituency of Whitehaven and Workington.

On 1 April 1974 the parish was abolished and merged with Maryport. At the 1951 census (one of the last before the abolition of the parish), Flimby had a population of 2066.

== Geography and flooding ==
Flimby is located on Cumbria's coast between the towns of Maryport to the north and Workington to the south.

It is drained by streams from nearby hillsides, some of which pass under the village in culverts. These have caused periodic flooding. Woody debris dams, as a form of natural flood management, have been built in the Penny Gill forest by the West Cumbria Rivers Trust to hold back water upstream and reduce flows through the culverts.

== Amenities ==
Flimby railway station on the Cumbrian Coast Line has served the village since 1846. Trains stop only by request. The village is also served by regular buses between Maryport, Workington and beyond.

The Anglican church of St Nicholas is in the Diocese of Carlisle. It holds services on the second and fourth Sundays of the month. The site of the successive former Flimby Methodist churches in West Lane (built in 1862 and about 1929) is now occupied by a house.

The village has a primary school with about 150 pupils. There is a convenience store and also a working men's social club.

Flimby's amateur rugby league club, the Vikings, plays in the Iggesund Cumberland League.

The shoe manufacturer New Balance has a factory on the outskirts of the village. Flimby Wind Farm opened in June 2013.

== Heritage ==
The name of the village was recorded as Flinbi in 1056 and Flemyngeby in the 12th century, and seems to come from Old Norse Flæminga bý, meaning "the village of the Flemings".

Flimby has three Grade II historic buildings listed by English Heritage. Flimby Cottage in Main Road is an early 19th-century pebble dash lodge in Gothic Revival style. Flimby Hall is a three-storey country house completed in 1766. Flimby Lodge is a mansion dating from the late 18th or early 19th century, derelict at the time it was listed in 1977.

== Transport ==
=== Bus ===
2 bus routes serve the village. Both run by Stagecoach. Service 300 to Carlisle or Workington and Service 30 to Maryport or Thornhill via Frizington.

=== Train ===
Flimby train station has services to Whitehaven or Carlisle with a few continuing to either Barrow-in-furness or Manchester Airport.

== Sport ==
The opening stage of the Tour of Britain Women's cycle race passed through Flimby in 2026.

== Notable people ==
- The Scottish novelist and poet Helen Craik lived at Flimby Hall from 1792 until her death in 1825 and has a memorial in the parish church.
- Dick Huddart (1936–2021), a professional rugby league player, was born in Flimby.
- The birth of John McKeown, the professional rugby league international, was registered in Flimby in 1926.
- Tee Ritson, rugby league player.

== See also ==
- Listed buildings in Maryport
- Flimby railway station
