= Helen Craik =

Scottish poet and novelist, c. 1751–1825

Helen Craik (c. 1751 – 11 June 1825) was a Scottish poet and novelist. She has been known as a correspondent of the Scottish poet Robert Burns, whom she praised for being a "native genius, gay, unique and strong" in an introductory poem she inscribed on his Glenriddell Manuscripts. More recent scholarship has focused on her own life and writings, rather than her link to Burns.

== Early life ==
Helen Craik was born at Arbigland, Kirkbean, 15 miles south of Dumfries, in the historical county of Kirkcudbrightshire, probably in 1751, as one of the six legitimate children of William Craik (1703–1798), a landowner and agriculturalist who improved a large estate of relatively poor land, and his wife Elizabeth (died 1787), daughter of William Stewart of Shambellie, in the next parish of New Abbey.

Before his marriage, William Craik had a son, James Craik, who was educated as a doctor, later emigrated to Virginia, and became George Washington's personal physician and Surgeon-General to the continental Army. The naval captain John Paul Jones (1747–1792), prominent in founding the US navy, was born at Arbigland and was also rumoured to be William Craik's illegitimate son, though Helen Craik strongly denied it . Earlier suppositions that one of her sisters was the novelist Catherine Cuthbertson have not held up and can be ruled out by the difference in their ages. Craik was later to write an account of her father's life and agricultural innovations in the form of two letters to The Farmer's Magazine, published in 1811.

== Burns ==
Through her father's friendship with Burns's neighbour Robert Riddell, Craik met Robert Burns, then farming at Ellisland, north of Dumfries. Two of Burns's his letters to her have survived, and several letters to Burns from her and her father. The first of Burns's letters to her, dated 9 August 1790 a, accompanied manuscript copies of two of his "late Pieces", and it is thought Burns sent her at least seven manuscript poems in all, including a manuscript of ' ' My luve is like a red, red rose.' ' Burns later also wrote to her expressing admiration for a poem of hers, "Helen", which was long thought lost, along with much or her other poetry, but which was rediscovered and printed in 2023.

Craik may also have been a friend of the fellow poet Maria Riddell, who was the sister-in-law of Robert Riddel, and moved to Dumfriesshire almost simultaneously with Craik leaving it.

== Craik as Poet ==
It has long been known that Craik wrote poetry, though she did not publish it. In addition to the short tribute to Burns, it was known that she had addressed two poems to Robert Riddel that survive in manuscript. Her poetry is mentioned in the letters she exchanged with Burns, and George Neilson's articles in 1919 and 1924 gave substantial extracts from one of her three manuscript notebooks then known. For the next hundred years, Craik's notebooks and poetry seemed to be lost. However, in 2020, one of the three was located in the Osborn Collection in the Beinecke Library at Yale University; a full transcription has since been published, with an introduction and background information, and the library has mounted scanned images of the notebook itself. Craik had prepared this manuscript, a fair copy collecting 39 poems she had written over a period of 20 years, at the request of Robert Riddel, in the early summer of 1790, when she and her father visited the Robert Riddels and met Burns. Burns borrowed the manuscript and wrote a short tribute to her, beginning "Envy not the hiddem treasure," on a blank preliminary leaf. Riddel had Craik's manuscript handsomely bound, with his crest gilt-stamped on the cover, in the same style later used for binding Burns's better-known Glenriddell Manuscript. The poems include satirical comment on local society in the Dumfries area, verse-letters to friends, and longer narrative poems, some based on tragic or shocking recent events, usually recounted by one of the participants. A later generation saw "Wertherism" in her poetry, suggesting that its sentimentalism and meolodrama was influenced by Goethe's epistolary novel The Sorrows of Werther (1774, rev. 1787). Craik wrote a lengthy poem based on Goethe's novel, probably in the late 1770s, from the point of view of Werther's guilt-ridden love Charlotte. These longer poems also anticipate some of the psychological interests Craik later developed in her novels.

== Cumberland ==
Early in 1792, Craik left Arbigland abruptly, in circumstances that are still unexplained, and moved to stay with a different branch of the Craik family at Flimby Lodge, Cumberland, across the Solway Firth from Kirkcudbrightshire. One explanation for her move has been her family's rumoured disapproval of her friendship with a groom on her father's estate, who was found shot, officially ruled as suicide, but locally believed to have been murdered by one of the Craiks. There was certainly a breach between Craik and her immediate family, but in the absence of contemporary evidence for the romance and either suicide or murder, modern scholars have been cautious about the story. Craik's departure also coincided with her father transferring the Arbigland house and estate to his grandson, Craik's nephew, Douglas Hamilton Craik, and the nephew's marriage in March 1792. On leaving Arbigland, Craik moved to Flimby Lodge, Cumberland, the home of her uncle, James Craik, her father's half-brother from her grandfather's second marriage, and lived there for the rest of her life.

== Novels ==
At Flimby, Craik turned from poetry to fiction, publishing five novels anonymously between 1796 and 1805 with William Lane of the Minerva Press, a firm best known for sentimental and Gothic fiction. Her novels develop similar themes and dramatic situations to those she had earlier explored in some of her longer narrative poems. Her first novel, Julia de Saint Pierre: A Tale of the French Revolution (3 vols, 1796), is dedicated to an unnamed family friend. It has a heroine who survives victimization by a degraded mother, by the mother's lover, and by a young man who unexpectedly betrays her. Henry of Northumberland, or The Hermit's Cell, A Tale of the Fifteenth Century (3 vols, 1800), with a gloomy medieval background, is the only one of the five not set in her own time, but clearly relates to the setting of, e.g. her poem 'The Monk of La Trappe'.

More complex and more fully discussed by recent critics is Adelaide de Narbonne, with Memoirs of Charlotte de Corday, A Tale (4 vols, 1800), Craik's second novel about the French Revolution. With contrasting strong female characters, and featuring revolutionary violence, and the massacre on monks in the remote monastery of La Trappe (reworking material from her poem), this has been called "perhaps the most impressive" of novels of opinion "in terms of its integration of plot and politics." Adrianna Craciun has drawn parallels between Craik's treatment of the French Revolution and Fanny Burney's novel The Wanderer, set in 1793 and written in the 1790s and intermittently up to its publication in 1814: "Like Burney, Craik does not ultimately support the French Revolution (though she creates some genial revolutionary characters like Corday in Adelaide de Norbonne, 1796, but rather removes her characters 'from the increasing anarchy prevalent in France' to 'the more peaceful island of Great Britain'" (p. 368).

Her two subsequent novels have so far received less critical attention. Stella of the North, or The Foundling of the Ship (4 vols, 1802), also dealing with the French Revolution, but set in her native Dumfriesshire, features two mysterious babies, one dead and one to be heroine. Her final novel was The Nun and her Daughter, or Memoirs of the Courville Family (4 vols, 1805).

== Memorial ==
Craik eventually inherited a half-share in land attached to the Flimby estate, and other bequests from her uncle and aunts, but no part of her father's estate at Arbigland, which went to Douglas Hamilton Craik. She died unmarried at Flimby Lodge on 11 June 1825. Her obituaries and her memorial in the village church call her a published author in English and French (works in the latter have not survived) and a philanthropist to the poor, a theme that appears in her novels.

== See also ==
- List of Minerva Press authors
- Minerva Press
