= Barker Crossing =

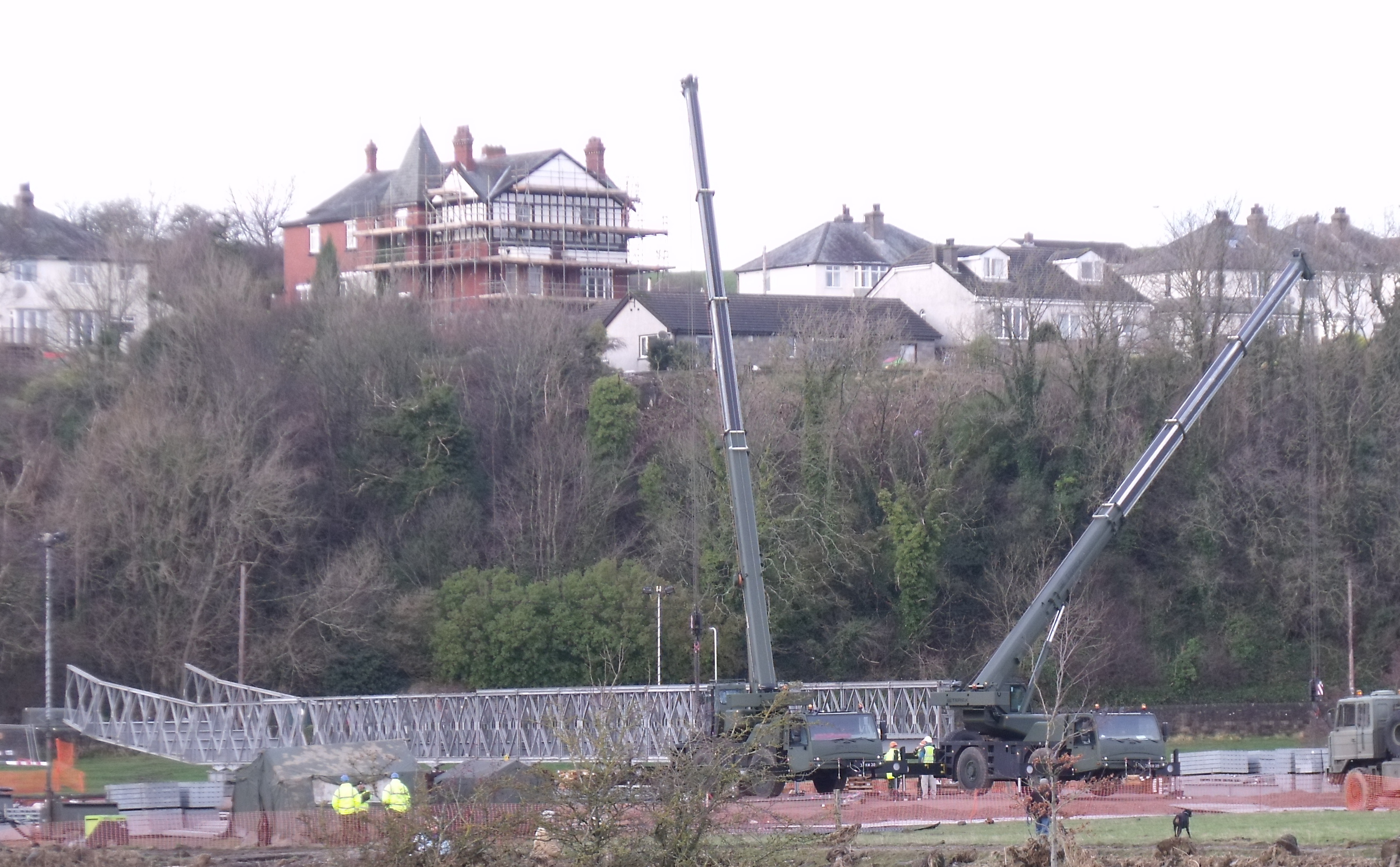
- Barker Crossing under construction
- Coordinates: 54.6488°N 3.5355°W
- Carries: Pedestrians
- Crosses: River Derwent
- Locale: Workington

Characteristics
- Design: Mabey Logistic Support Bridge
- Material: Steel
- Total length: 52 metres (171 ft)

History
- Constructed by: Royal Engineers (3 Armoured Engineer Squadron)
- Construction start: 27 November 2009; 16 years ago
- Construction end: 5 December 2009; 16 years ago
- Opened: 7 December 2009; 16 years ago
- Closed: 14 February 2011; 15 years ago

Location
- Interactive map of Barker Crossing

Barker Crossing was a pedestrian footbridge in Workington, Cumbria, England that crossed the River Derwent, and linked the north and south sides of the town. Army engineers built it in November 2009 after flooding put the town's bridges out of use, and removed it in February 2011. The bridge was named after police officer Bill Barker, who died when the Northside Bridge in Workington collapsed below him.

== History ==
During the November 2009 Great Britain and Ireland floods, all four road and pedestrian bridges in Workington were either swept away, or severely damaged, leaving one sound railway bridge crossing the River Derwent in the town. This left the residents with a 14-mile (23 km) trip to get from one side of the Derwent to the other. On 30 November 2009, Workington North railway station was opened allowing people to travel by train between the north and south sides.

== Construction ==
Foundations on the river banks were started on 27 November 2009 and used 4,000 tonnes of aggregate. The 110 tonne, 52 metre single-span Mabey Logistic Support Bridge was constructed in Mill Field, on the south bank, and launched across the river, with its "nose" landing on the north bank on 4 December. The bridge was then pushed onto the north bank, and a steel deck laid. Street furniture including lighting was added, and the bridge opened to the public just after 08:00 (GMT) on 7 December 2009.

The bridge was constructed by Royal Engineers of 3 Armoured Engineer Squadron, 22 Engineer regiment based at Tidworth, Wiltshire. They worked 24 hours a day in adverse weather conditions including driving rain much of the week and temperatures as low as −8 °C.

== Naming ==
The bridge was named in honour of PC Bill Barker who drowned in the River Derwent in Workington in the early morning of 20 November 2009. Barker was on the damaged Northside Bridge, stopping traffic from using it. The bridge was swept away beneath him. His body was washed up on a beach at Allonby. He left a widow, Hazel, and four children. The bridge was named after Barker following a campaign by teenagers from Workington launched on YouTube.

Barker joined the police on 3 January 1984, at age 19. He worked on Brigham Traffic Control, then the Western Mobile Support Group which then became the Western Roads Policing Unit. He was a family liaison officer. In August 1997, he received a chief constable’s commendation for his courage and tenacity during a pursuit with a Land Rover Discovery in the Keswick area; it rammed his car twice. The then Prime Minister Gordon Brown described him as a "very heroic, very brave man".

On 27 November 2009, he was buried at Egremont, Cumbria. His funeral was the lead item on the BBC TV 6 o'clock news. The next day, Prince Charles met his family in private. The inquest into Barker's death opened on 13 October 2010 at Cleator Moor civic hall. On 15 October 2010 the inquest ruled that Barker's death was an accident.

== Closure ==
On 14 February 2011 work began to remove the bridge, which was no longer needed as the repaired Calva Bridge was due to reopen to pedestrians that day.
