= 2009 Workington floods =

Natural disaster in Cumbria, England

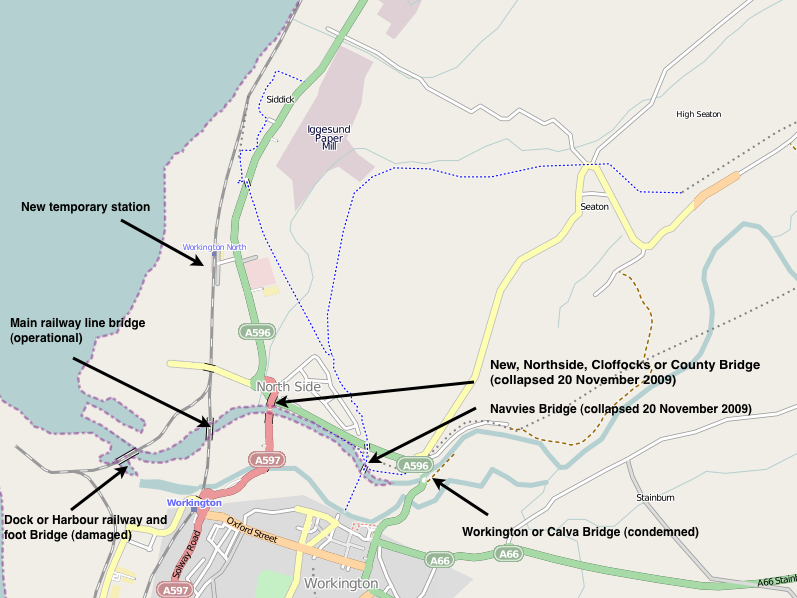
Map showing the location of the stations and the damaged bridges

During the twenty-four hours before Friday 20 November 2009, rainfall of over 300 mm (12 in) was recorded in Cumbria. Flooding along the Borrowdale and Derwent Valley meant that some areas were up to 8 feet (2.4 m) deep in water. The surge of water off the fells of the Lake District which flowed into Workington down the River Derwent washed away a road bridge and a footbridge. PC Bill Barker was killed when Northside Bridge collapsed. The cemetery at Camerton, historically the burial ground for the community of Seaton, was badly damaged with many gravestones being damaged or upturned.

Shortly after the town was divided, Network Rail announced the construction of a new railway station, Workington North railway station, to be completed within a week on land owned by the local council, to enable access across the river for residents.

== Bridges damaged and destroyed ==
=== Workington (or Calva) Bridge ===
As a result of the floods the central arch of Workington (or Calva Bridge) (built 1840) was left unsound and ready to collapse. As a Grade II listed structure, the bridge was analysed by structural experts after the floods, with the aim of being able to repair and reopen the bridge. Workington Bridge reopened to pedestrians on 11 February 2011, Now the bridge is open to vehicles.

==== Navvies Bridge ====
Navvies Bridge was a former railway bridge, built in 1878 by the Cleator and Workington Junction Railway Company. After the railway line was closed, it was used as a footpath and cycle way, linking the Northside community on the north of the river, to Workington's town centre. Navvies Bridge collapsed in the early hours of 20 November 2009. Work on designing replacement bridge began in May 2011, and the new bridge was officially opened to the public, four months later on 10 September.

==== New, Northside, Cloffocks or County Bridge ====
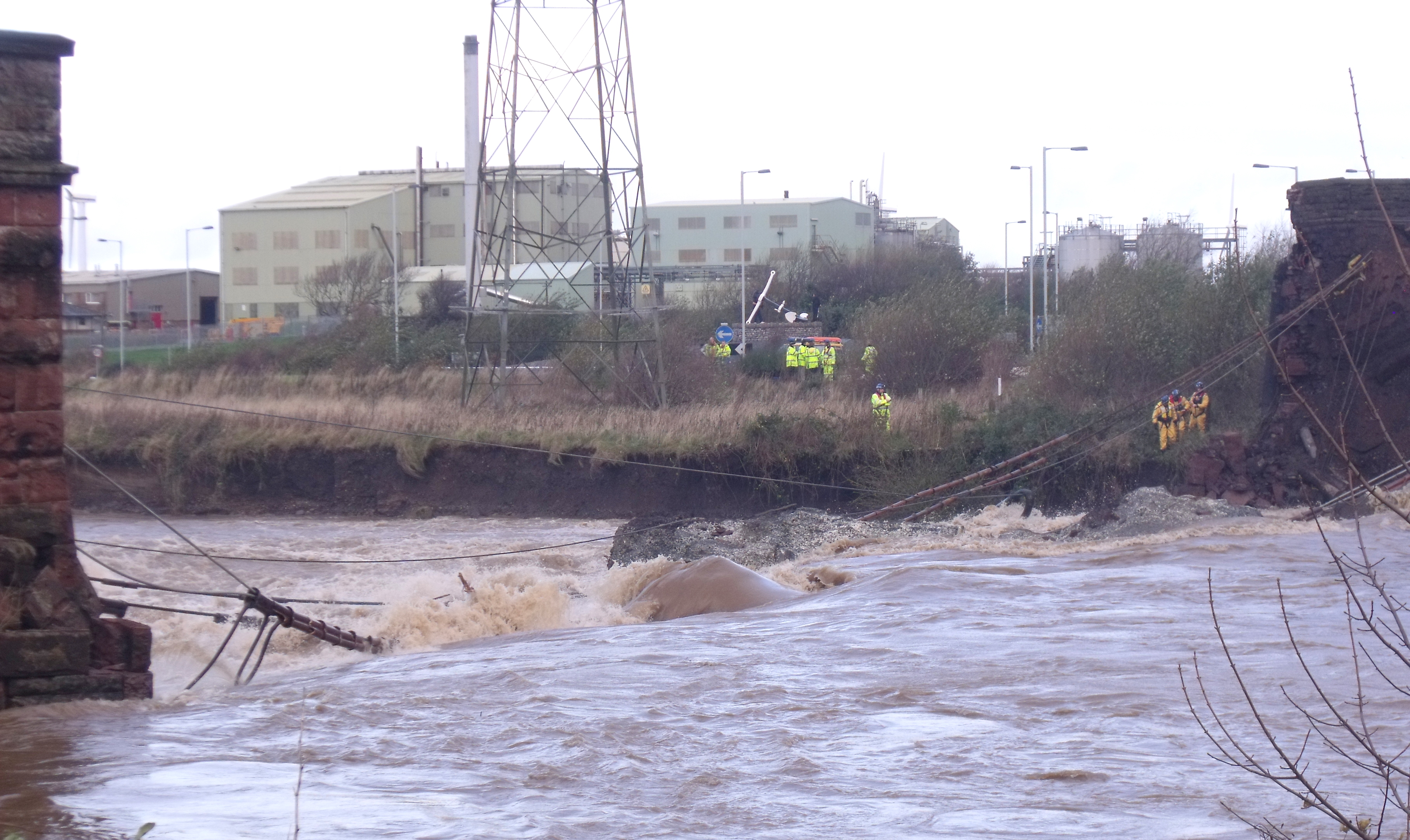
Northside Bridge the morning after collapse 20 November 2009. Viewed from the Cloffocks.

New Bridge (built 1904) collapsed on the morning of 20 November 2009: it carried a major road from the Low Cloffocks to the north side of the river. PC Bill Barker was directing traffic away from the bridge when it collapsed into the river. The bridge had been the subject of a Local Government Board Inquiry in 1903, which raised issues relating to its construction.

Work on a permanent replacement bridge began on 15 August 2011. After completion in October 2012, the bridge was opened by HRH Princess Anne on 22 October 2012.

==== Misers Bridge (or Camerton Bridge) ====
A road bridge over a disused railway line in the village of Camerton collapsed due to floodwaters on the railway line. The bridge was the only vehicular access to the church yard of St Peter's Church in Camerton. The bridge has not been replaced, instead the gap has been filled in and levelled up.

==== Dock or Harbour Bridge ====
Dock Bridge carried a single track railway and footpath linking the steelworks and the docks. It had two sections with one span over the South Gut from the South Quay to the Merchant's Quay and the other from Merchant's Quay over the River Derwent to the north side of the river. The end of Merchant's Quay, built of sandstone blocks, was swept away by the floods. The bridge was demolished.

==== Barker Crossing ====
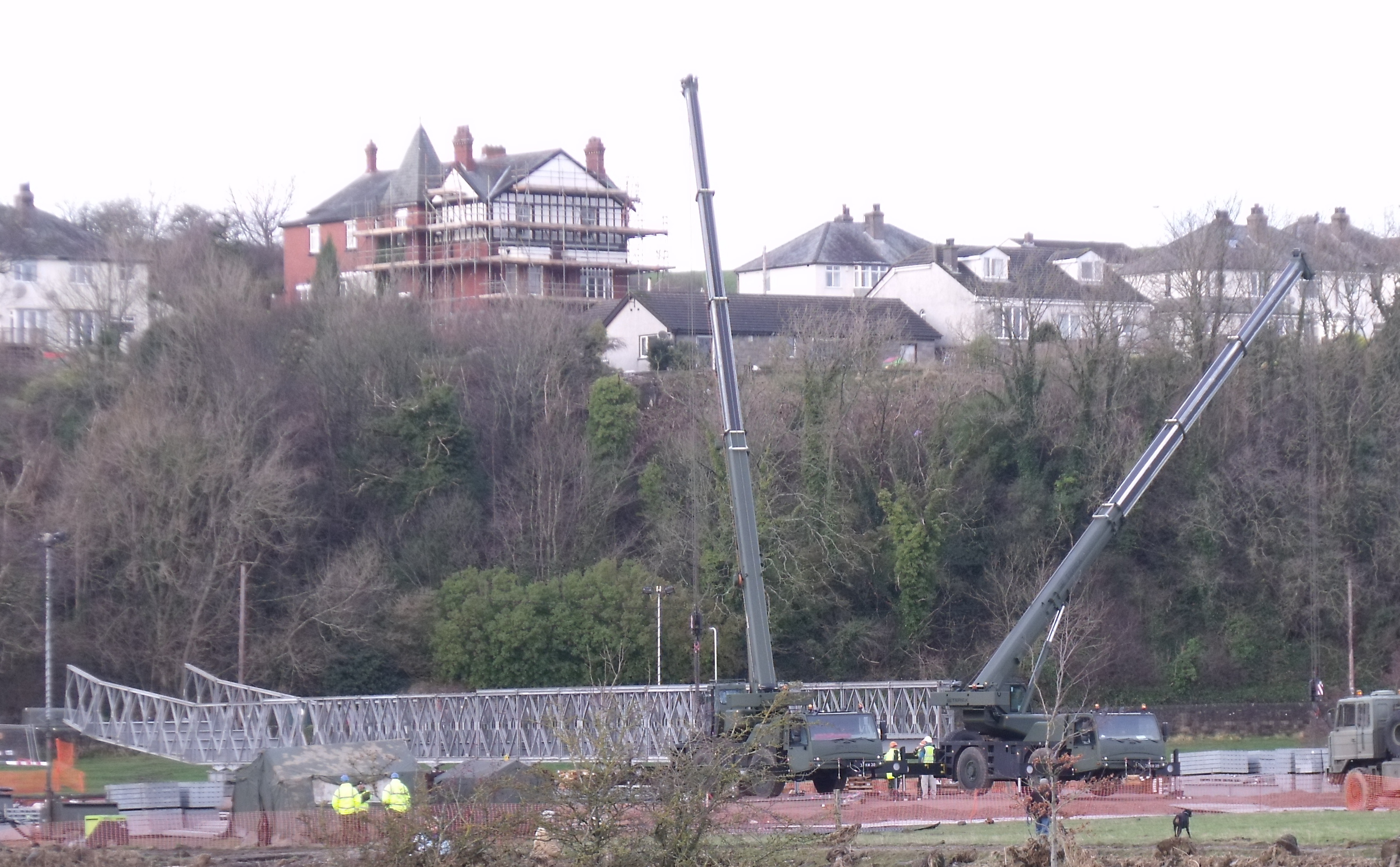
Mill Field on 3 December 2009. Army engineers working 24-hour days to construct the footbridge

Royal Engineers from 3 Armoured Squadron and 170 Infrastructure Support Group, Royal Engineers installed a footbridge (200 m) upstream of Calva Bridge. Seventeen pre-fabricated bridge sections were assembled and dropped into place on the newly established foundations. The 170 ft (52m) bridge across the River Derwent took a week to build, opening 7 December 2009 Barker Crossing was opened. It was named after Bill Barker who was killed when the flood washed the old bridge away. Barker's heroic actions – going out onto the stone bridge on foot to direct traffic off it – are honoured in a song named "Mr Rain The Tailor," by English singer-songwriter Reg Meuross.

The crossing was taken down in February 2011, after the nearby Calva bridge was repaired and reopened to pedestrians.
