= 2009 Great Britain and Ireland floods =

Natural disaster in the UK and Ireland

- Areas affected by flooding Death(s) from flooding Areas affected by strong winds Death(s) from strong winds

Meteorological history
- Duration: 1 November 2009 – December 2009

Overall effects
- Fatalities: 4
- Areas affected: Ireland: Cork; County Carlow; County Clare; County Cork; County Dublin; County Galway; County Kerry; County Kildare; County Kilkenny; County Leitrim; County Limerick; County Longford; County Mayo; County Offaly; County Roscommon; County Sligo; County Tipperary; County Westmeath; Northern Ireland; England: Cornwall; Cumbria; Devon; Dorset; East Sussex; Essex; Hampshire; Isle of Wight; Kent; Lancashire; Shropshire; Suffolk; West Sussex; Northern Ireland: County Londonderry County Tyrone; Scotland: Dumfries and Galloway; Perth and Kinross; Scottish Borders; Wales: Carmarthenshire; Conwy; Pembrokeshire; Powys; Elsewhere: Isle of Man

The 2009 Great Britain and Ireland floods were a weather event that affected parts of Great Britain and Ireland throughout November and into December 2009. November was the wettest month across the United Kingdom since records began in 1914 and had well above average temperatures. The worst affected area in Great Britain was the English county of Cumbria. The Irish counties of Clare, Cork, Galway and Westmeath were among the worst affected areas of Ireland.

European windstorms bringing heavy rain and gale-force winds caused damage and flooding to the south of Great Britain on 13–14 November. Unsettled weather continued across the south and later to the north. On 19–20 November, many towns and villages in Cumbria and Dumfries and Galloway were affected. A number of bridges collapsed, one of which led to the death of a police officer, who was standing on the bridge when it collapsed. Another death occurred on 21 November as a canoeist was trapped against a tree near Poundsgate, on Dartmoor in Devon. In Powys, there were two deaths, at Newtown and Talybont-on-Usk.

Among the many places severely flooded was the Republic of Ireland's second largest city, Cork. For more than ten days, 40 per cent of its population were without running water after a treatment plant was affected by several metres of flood water. University College Cork was damaged and at least a week of lectures was cancelled. Courts were also disrupted, with some eventually being moved to a hotel. At the time, Taoiseach Brian Cowen described the situation in Ireland as an "ongoing emergency" that was going to get worse.

== Event ==
Before the severe gales affecting the United Kingdom on 13 November, unsettled weather had been affecting all of the United Kingdom since 12 November.

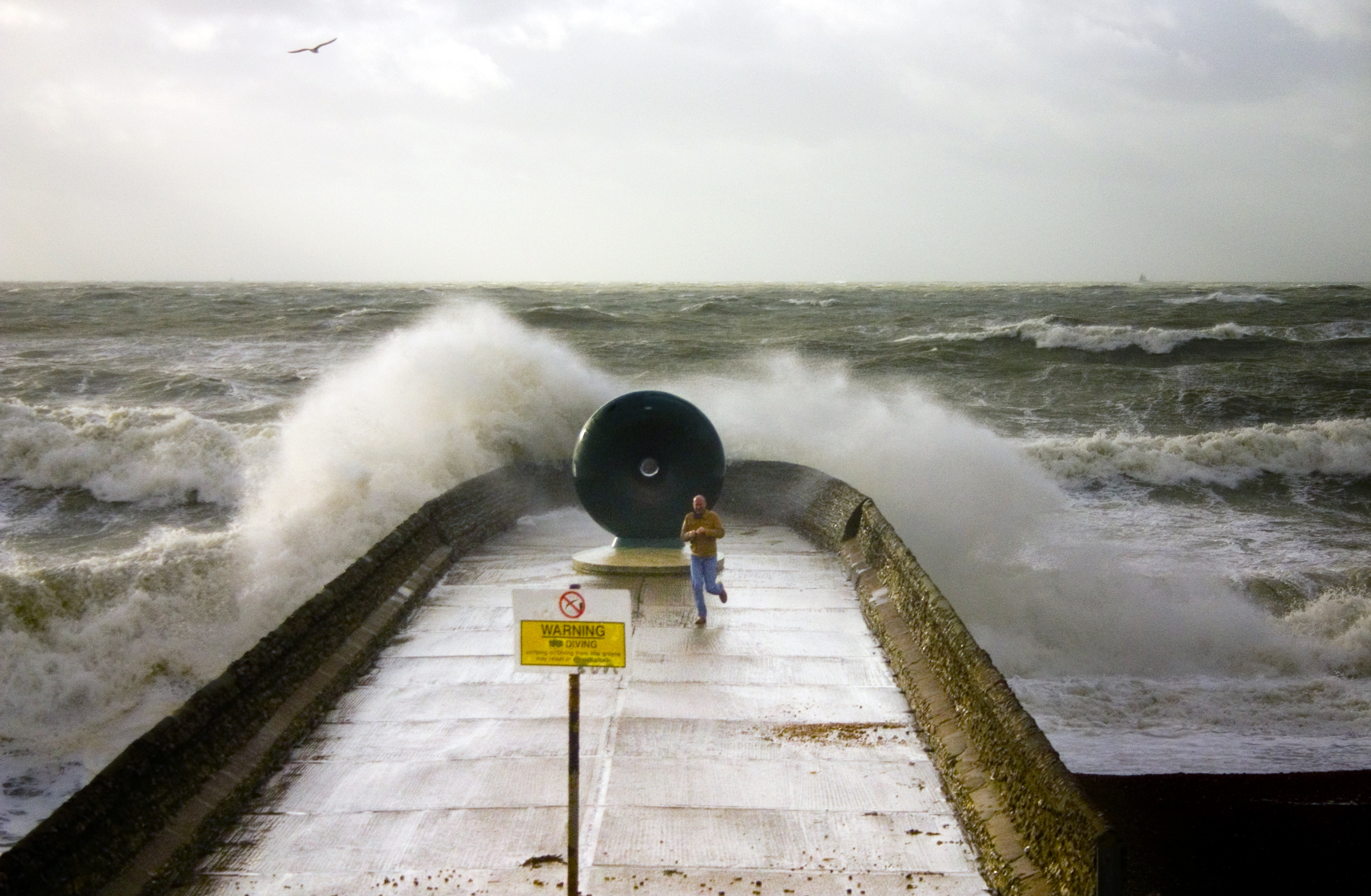
Sea conditions observed on 14 November in Brighton, England

On 13 November an area of low pressure developed to the south-west of Ireland. It moved north-eastwards across the Irish Sea and west Scotland on 14 November. Weather fronts bringing heavy rain swept across the west and south of the United Kingdom. 30 mm (1.2 inches) of rainfall in three hours was recorded in some parts of Sussex and Hampshire. The wind, coming from the south, reached gale to severe gale strength on 13 November; gusting between 65 and 75 mph (105 and 121 km/h) in some areas. On 14 November, strong winds and showers affected southern Great Britain, with winds gusting up to 50 and 90 mph (80 and 145 km/h) on the coast. A tornado was reported to have occurred in the east of England on 14 November.

Over the night of 19–20 November 2009, a forecast depression tracked northwest over Ireland, the Isle of Man, Cumbria and Dumfries and Galloway. Rainfall in a 24-hour period was recorded at 71.6 mm (2.82 inches) at Shap and 64.2 mm (2.53 inches) at Keswick. At Seathwaite Farm, Borrowdale, rainfall was recorded at 314.4 mm (12.38 inches) in a 24-hour period which the Met Office state is provisionally a UK record for any single location. At Penrith a multi-agency co-ordination centre was established. The floods were described as "the worst in 55 years". The Met Office reported that at Eskdalemuir, the amount of rainfall recorded in a 24-hour period exceeded the previous record set in 1931.

Heavy rain across Devon on 21 November caused the River Dart on Dartmoor to swell. A group of canoeists on the river were treated for hypothermia and one of the members died after being trapped against a tree at Poundsgate.

== Damage ==
=== 1–12 November ===
The Met Office predicted that an area of low pressure would "explosively deepen close to the UK on Sunday 1 November," which resulted in heavy rain across the country. Thirteen people were rescued from homes and vehicles in more than 100 flooding incidents across Wales.

In Scotland on 1 November, Angus and Aberdeenshire were badly hit by flooding, causing transport disruption, burst pipes and the evacuation of hundreds of homes. The coastal town of Arbroath was one of the worst affected, being virtually cut off by severe flooding

In Northern Ireland, villages near the County Tyrone-County Londonderry border were hit by heavy rainfall the night of 4 November causing several families to be evacuated, and more than a dozen homes flooded.

Sligo was heavily flooded on 9 November. Passage West in County Cork was subjected to a thirty-minute flash flood on 12 November, causing an estimated €100,000 worth of damage and wrecking ten cars and several homes.

=== 13–15 November ===
The area of low pressure affecting southern Great Britain on 13–14 November caused some surface water flooding and damage from gales. Surface water flooding affected Devon and Cornwall. The gale-force winds across the counties brought down trees, branches, power cables and roofs. Local authorities and the Highways Agency were strained in maintaining traffic flow. Dorset reported coastal flooding as severe gales occurred during high tide. Some residents across the Welsh counties of Pembrokeshire and Carmarthenshire were rescued by Mid and West Wales Fire and Rescue Service. Flooding was widespread in the Conwy Valley, with homes in Betws-y-Coed, Llanrwst and nearby villages affected. Twelve people were rescued from a coach trapped in floodwater at Haverfordwest.

The Environment Agency issued 110 flood warnings prior to the storm reaching Great Britain on 13–14 November. Peak gusts reached 100 mph (160 km/h) at The Needles lighthouse, Isle of Wight. A tornado developed in Benfleet, Essex, damaging 60 homes. Another tornado in Lowestoft, Suffolk brought down a tree trapping a woman in a car. In Haywards Heath, West Sussex, people were rescued from units on an industrial estate which was 60 cm (2 ft) deep in water.

=== 18–25 November ===
==== Great Britain ====
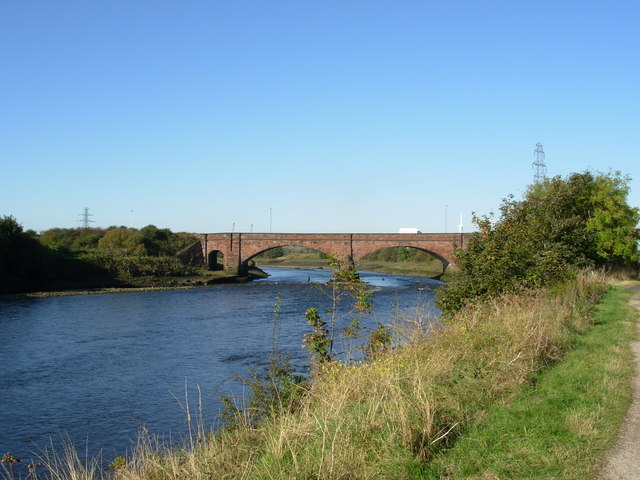

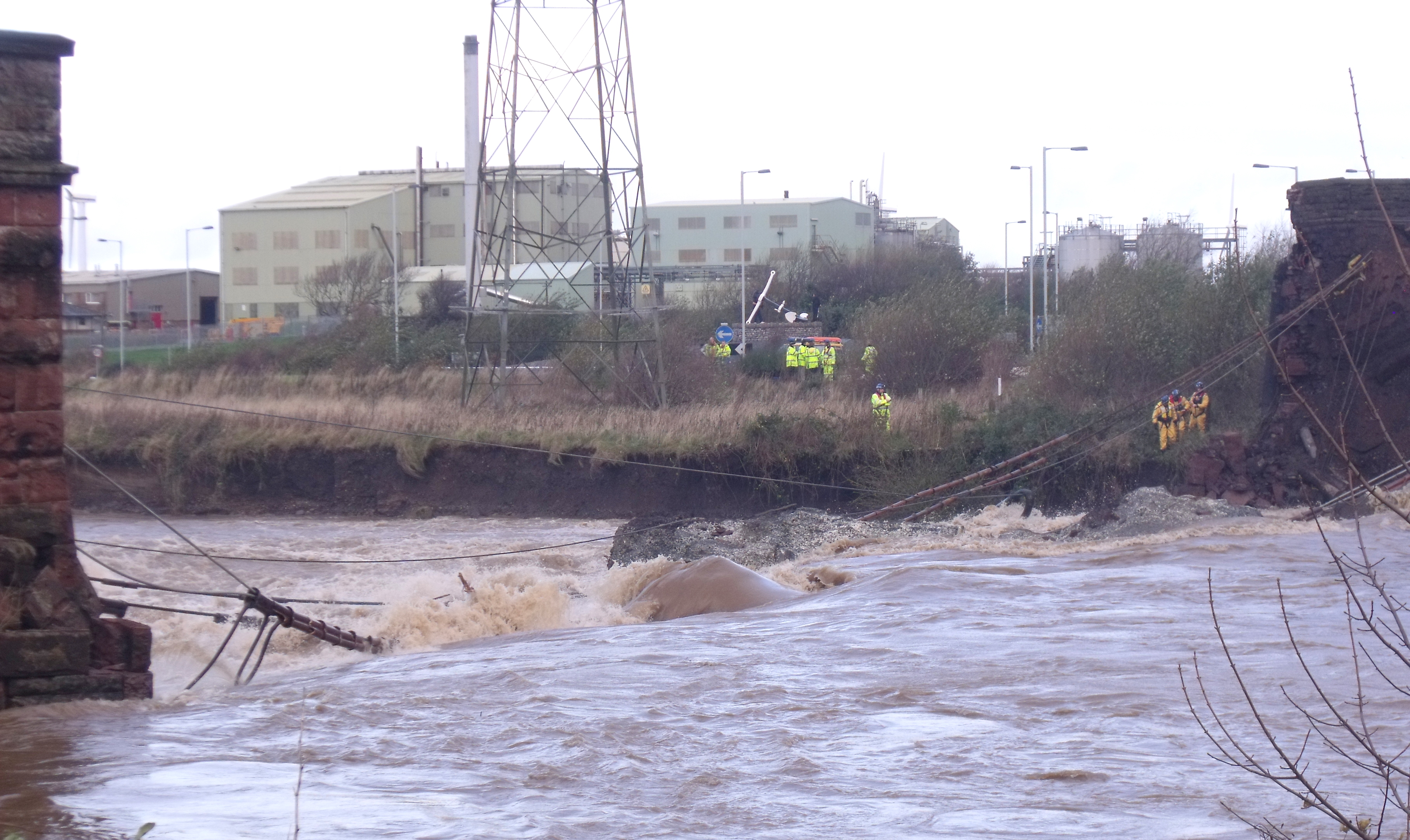
Northside Bridge over the River Derwent in Workington, seen here before and after it was destroyed

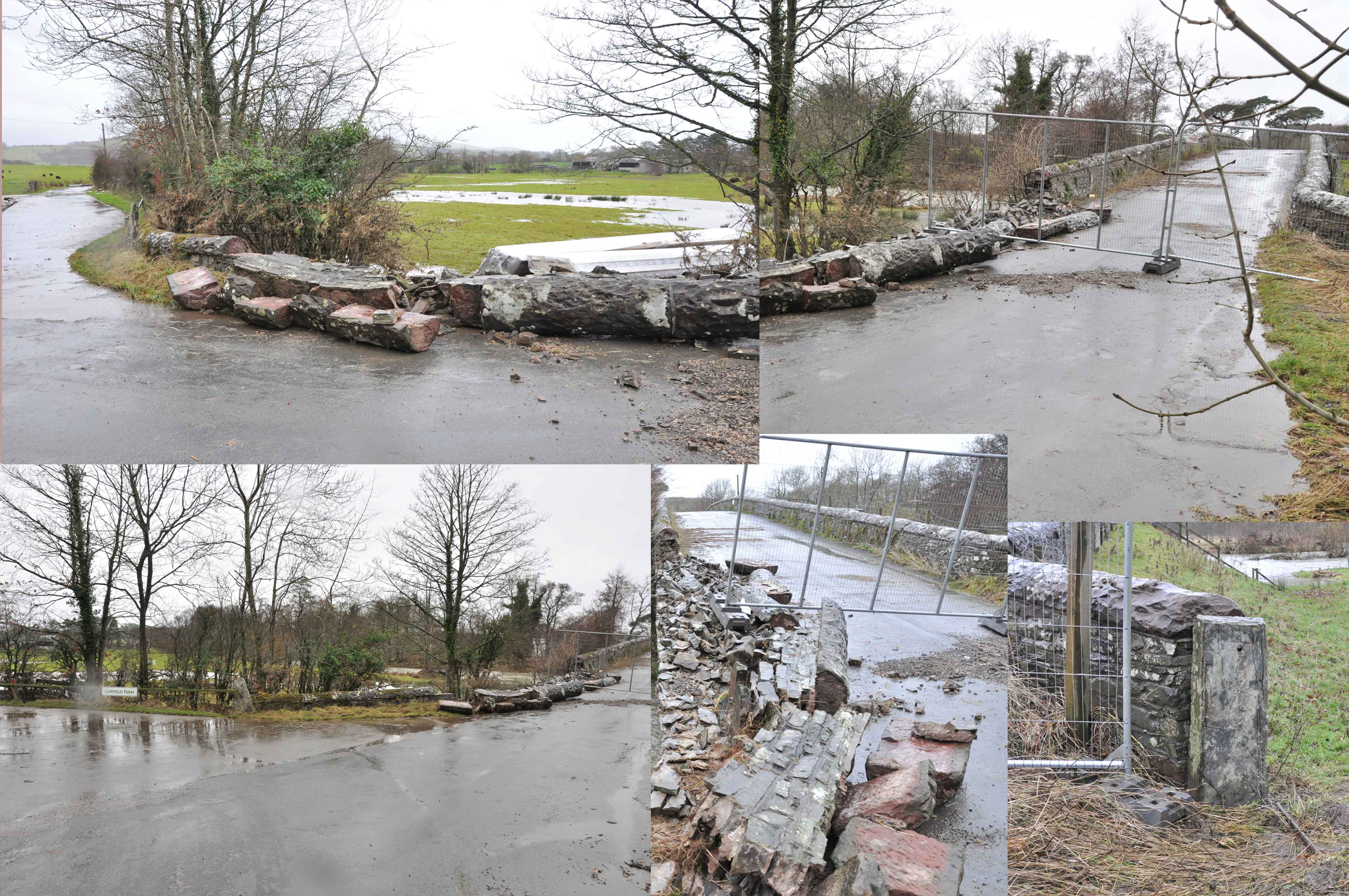
Damage done to the Southwaite Mill Bridge

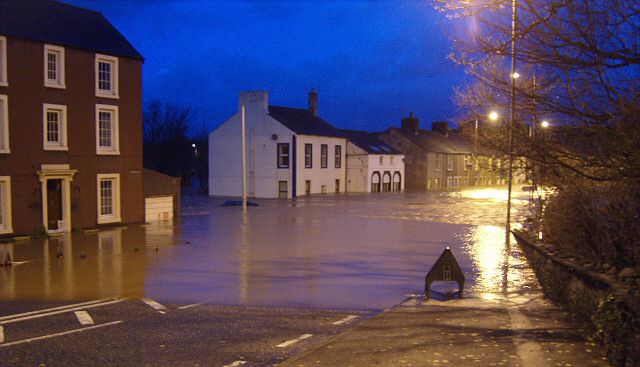
The approach to Calva Bridge, Workington, 20 November 2009

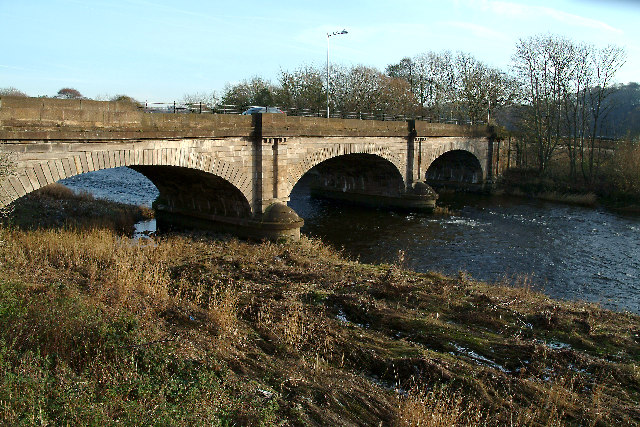
Calva Bridge, Workington, which was condemned as a result of damage received in the flooding

In Lancashire, firefighters had to rescue schoolchildren trapped in a bus stranded by floodwater at Sawley, and flooding occurred in Barnoldswick, Blackburn, Burnley and Rossendale. Workers at Kippax Mill in Crawshawbooth were evacuated when the building was hit by a landslide as the hill collapsed under the weight of water.

Many properties were flooded in Ambleside, leaving the main road impassable for most vehicles. Over 200 people in Cockermouth were rescued from their homes by the emergency services. About 75 people were accommodated overnight in Cockermouth School and the Shepherds Hotel (known locally as the Sheep & Wool Centre). Search and rescue helicopters from RAF Valley, RAF Boulmer and RAF Leconfield rescued approximately 50 people, with the remainder being rescued by boat, particularly by the RNLI, and HM Coastguard. A Coastguard helicopter was deployed to the area from Stornoway to supplement the military SAR assets. Water levels in the town centre were reported to be as high as 2.50 metres (8 ft 2 in), resulting in the collapse of Lorton Bridge, and over 1,200 properties losing their electricity supply. Coniston Water burst its banks and submerged roads, fields and local premises. Electricity supply was lost to 349 properties in Keswick. About 50 people were accommodated overnight in Keswick's Convention Centre, as well as the Skiddaw Hotel and St Joseph's School. Several homes were also flooded in the town after the River Greta burst its banks, rising 1.5 metres (4 ft 11 in) above normal.

In south Ulverston, a number of residents had to be evacuated – around 80 homes were flooded on North Lonsdale Road and the surrounding areas, with many accommodated at Ulverston Victoria High School. A number of A roads in the surrounding area had to be closed off and some train services were disrupted.

In Workington, the Northside Bridge over the River Derwent collapsed. The bridge carried the A597 and its collapse cut off gas supplies to the town. Bill Barker, a police constable, died in the bridge collapse, following a called-off lifeboat search. The replacement for Northside Bridge has been finished in 2015.

The Southwaite Footbridge on the trackbed of the dismantled Cockermouth and Workington Railway collapsed.

The bridge over the River Cocker in Low Lorton was also destroyed. Its replacement opened on Monday 31 January.

On Windermere in the Lake District approximately 20 boats sank due to the floods. The boats were all moored to a fixed pier, and could not rise with the rising water.

Also in Workington, Calva Bridge was reported on 22 November to have dropped by about 300 millimetres (1 ft). Police warned that it could collapse too. The bridge was later condemned, leaving residents in Northside a 40 miles (64 km) journey to get into Workington. Calva bridge had been built in 1841 by Thomas Milton. It was designed by Thomas Nelson. The bridge is a Grade II listed building. Although badly damaged, it was decided that the bridge could be repaired, as work carried out in 2005 to waterproof the deck had strengthened the bridge too. The contract for the repair work was awarded jointly to Balfour Beatty and Mouchel. Engineers warned that there was a 50% chance that the bridge could collapse during repairs. Two-thirds of the central pier's foundations had been washed away during the flood.

The Dock Bridge, which carries the railway line linking Workington Docks and the steelworks, was badly damaged. Photographs show that at least one of the concrete trestles has been washed away, dislodging the rails on the bridge.

Newlands Beck Bridge, Braithwaite, near Keswick, collapsed, as did Camerton footbridge near Workington. A suspension footbridge over the River Eamont at Dalemain also collapsed.

The Whitesands area of Dumfries was affected by flooding when the River Nith burst its banks. Five people were rescued by firefighters, and another two were rescued by boat from a stranded car. In the Scottish Borders several homes were flooded in Ettrick and Yarrow.

In Wales, a woman was reported missing in Brecon on 21 November, having apparently fallen into the River Usk after crossing a bridge that had a 1.83 metres (6 ft) gap in the railings. Dyfed-Powys Police and Mid and West Wales Fire and Rescue Service started a search which was called off overnight. It was resumed the next morning. A body was recovered from the River Usk at Talybont-on-Usk on 24 November. At Newtown, Powys, the body of a pensioner was found on the banks of the River Severn on 23 November. She had been reported missing on 21 November.

In Shropshire flood defences were deployed along the Severn Valley and some minor roads were closed due to flooding.

==== Isle of Man ====
On the Isle of Man, there were power cuts in Ballaragh and Laxey but Manx Electricity restored power to all affected properties by the afternoon.

==== Ireland ====
In the Republic of Ireland; a family of five were winched to safety by helicopter in County Galway, and damage was caused to the Lake Hotel at Killarney in County Kerry. About 40 families at Ballinasloe in County Galway had to be evacuated by boat after the River Suck burst its banks. The centre of Cork was flooded by the River Lee to a depth of 1 metre (3 ft 3 in), and the nearby towns of Bandon, Clonakilty, Dunmanway and Skibbereen were inaccessible. University College Cork sustained widespread damage, prompting it to cancel all lectures for at least one week.

Thousands of homes across the country were left with boiled-water notices, and over 40,000 homes were left without any water supply. In Cork City, over 18,000 homes on the city's north and inner south-sides were left without water for up to ten days. This was as a result of flood damage to the city's water treatment plant. The Irish Army was deployed to deal with rising floodwaters at Ennis, County Clare, Athlone, County Westmeath and Clonmel, County Tipperary. Electricity supplies were cut off in Bandon, Cork and east County Galway. The house of one old lady in Athlone was even reported to have been the victim of flooding. A lorry driver had to be lifted from his vehicle in County Roscommon after it became struck in water beneath a bridge. Many homes and apartments in Athlones westbank were evacuated as the river levels of the Shannon rose.

The floods affected a nationwide pre-planned strike action, with members of trade unions SIPTU, IMPACT and the TEEU postponing the unrest it had scheduled for County Cork, County Clare and County Galway on 24 November so that they could assist with giving as much relief as possible.

In Northern Ireland, the low-lying areas around the River Bann in County Armagh as well as the Strabane, Ards, Cookstown, Lisburn and Magherafelt districts were affected by flooding. County Fermanagh sustained the worst levels of flooding, with water levels on Lough Erne at their highest since first being recorded in 1956, owing to 35 consecutive days of rain. The floods affected many areas close to the shore of the lough including Lisnaskea and the county town, Enniskillen.

=== 25–29 November ===
The plight of Athlone, County Westmeath came to light at this time when water levels at the town's lock reached around 50 centimetres above the previous record water level, six of these centimetres occurring during one night. Farms and housing estates were isolated, with the west side experiencing some of the worst flooding and a school being forced to close for several days. Some residents were cautiously evacuated from Limerick's Ardnacrusha district and eight homes were evacuated in Clonlara, County Clare. Farmland between Ballina and Foxford in County Mayo was flooded. Waterways Ireland claimed on 25 November that the water level of the River Shannon (Ireland's largest river) had become "unmanageable", with 33 per cent of the usual annual rain dropping in November alone.

The water level of Lough Derg had broken all previous records by 26 November. This caused the purposeful release of more water downstream which subsequently flooded these areas by around 10 more centimetres of water. Further evacuations took place in County Clare and the city of Limerick. The Irish Army continued to patrol Ennis. Waters continued to rise in County Galway as well at this time.

On 28–29 November torrential downpours and heavy winds spread across Devon and Cornwall, causing flooding and damage. Four people were rescued by firefighters from cars across Devon. Street-water levels reached 4 feet (1.2 m) near Exeter and 3 feet (0.91 m) near Sparkwell. Properties were flooded across the City of Plymouth and Ivybridge. Winds brought down an electricity pole in Millbrook, Cornwall.

Ireland's flooding shifted to the east of the country on 29 November. Dublin's River Liffey burst its banks on 29 November, flooding several areas. Towns in County Kildare which were near the Liffey, were damaged by floods, including Ballymore Eustace, Kilcullen, Newbridge, Clane, Celbridge, Naas and Leixlip. A Clane nursing home was evacuated.

Courts scheduled for Cork and Skibbereen were adjourned for several days due to flooded courthouses. Circuit court cases scheduled for Cork were moved to a hotel and High Court cases were moved to Clonmel.

=== 30 November – 4 December ===
On 30 November, firefighters had to pump water from one estate in Sallins from which 104 families were subjected to an emergency evacuation. The River Liffey was still impassable at Strawberry Beds.

On 1 December, there was more torrential rain in the west, with drinking water supplies to 6,000 buildings in Galway reported to have been contaminated by human faeces and water undrinkable in more than 500 homes in Clare and Limerick.

On 2 December, thousands of acres of Irish farmland remained underwater, floodwaters were still rising in some Galway villages and roads in Clare and Galway were still impassable.

== Transport disruption ==
=== 13–14 November ===
The Gloucester to Newport Line through Wales and England was closed at Chepstow after heavy rain caused a rockslide on 13 November. Several roads across Cornwall were flooded under 60 cm (24 inches) of water. The Tamar Bridge connecting Devon and Cornwall was closed to bicycles, motorbikes and high-sided vehicles. Ferries between England and France were cancelled during the storm and the Port of Dover was closed during part of 14 November.

=== 18–23 November ===
Services on the West Coast Main Line were temporarily suspended after a landslip between Carlisle and Penrith. Services resumed by midday on 20 November.

Services between Glasgow and Dunblane were suspended. The West Coast Main Line was flooded between Carlisle and Carstairs and was closed as a result. Services were reduced between Edinburgh and Glasgow and also Edinburgh and Dunblane.

The Cambrian Line was closed between Newtown, Powys and Machynlleth as a result of severe flooding on the River Dyfi. Replacement buses were provided by the service's operator, Arriva Trains Wales.

In the Republic of Ireland, Iarnród Éireann rail services were suspended between Galway and Athlone; Limerick and Ennis; Carrick-on-Shannon and Longford; Dublin and Maynooth; and Wicklow and Gorey.

On 18 November, the Isle of Man Steam Packet Company cancelled the morning ferry service from Douglas to Heysham and consequently the return service was also cancelled. The first service from Heysham was cancelled on 19 November. Services resumed with the 08:45 sailing from Douglas to Heysham.

In Kent, ferry services from Dover were affected by strong winds on 18 November. Services operated by LD Lines, Norfolkline, P&O Ferries and Seafrance were subject to delay. Kent Police implemented phase one of Operation Stack, using the M20 to park lorries on until they could be accommodated on a ferry.

On 21 November, Irish Ferries cancelled all sailings due to have been performed by HSC Jonathan Swift on the Dublin – Holyhead route. Passengers were accommodated on MV Ulysses.

In Workington, the collapse of Northside Bridge carrying the A597 road and the condemnation of Calva Bridge carrying the A596 resulted in a 40 miles (64 km) journey from Northside to the town centre. Network Rail constructed a temporary railway station, Workington North, to help Northside residents get into and out of town. The Royal Engineers from 170 (Infrastructure Support) and 3 Armoured Engineer Squadron are to install a temporary footbridge upstream of Calva Bridge, scheduled to open on 5 December 2009.

In County Fermanagh, high water levels on Lough Erne resulted in the closure of most bridges that link the east and west sides of the county. Diverted traffic was thus forced to pass through the county town of Enniskillen, itself sited on an island in the lough, causing major delays. Away from the lough, the town of Lisnaskea as well as the villages of Derrylin and Boho also saw severe flooding, resulting in several road closures.

=== 24–29 November ===
25 November saw fierce winds rattle Dublin Airport leading to the diversion of ten Aer Lingus, Delta Air Lines, Etihad Airways and Ryanair aircraft—seven aircraft to Shannon Airport and three aircraft to Manchester Airport. Some of the affected aircraft were transatlantic flights from destinations such as Chicago and New York.

== Sports disruption ==
All horse races scheduled for Naas racecourse on 25 November were cancelled because of waterlogging. A horse race scheduled for 28 November at Wexford was cancelled four days earlier as the course was waterlogged. The Naas and Wexford events were rescheduled for 3 and 7 December respectively.

== Reaction ==
My thoughts and prayers are with all those who have been affected and whose homes and livelihoods have been damaged.

— Queen Elizabeth II

What you've done in the last few days is tackle one of the greatest rainfalls we've seen in our country and you've done it with such superb organisation.

— Gordon Brown, British Prime Minister

We have been told this is a once-in-800-years event.

— John Gormley, Minister for the Environment of Ireland.

On 21 November, British Prime Minister Gordon Brown visited Cumbria Police headquarters, near Penrith, to meet members of the emergency services before travelling to Cockermouth where he met people who had been evacuated from their homes. He pledged an additional £1,000,000 would be made available in aid for the affected areas when it was noted that the damages could well run into £50 million to £100 million mark. During his visit, Gordon Brown ordered checks to be made on all 1,800 bridges in Cumbria. It was feared that Calva Bridge in Workington would also collapse. Bridge inspections will be carried out by the Highways Agency and the Department for Transport.

Cockermouth MP Tony Cunningham said that the buildings in Cockermouth may be broken, but the people were not. Following the death of the police officer, Cumbria Constabulary stated that over 10,000 people had signed a tribute on its Facebook page. The Queen praised emergency workers for the support they had provided. The ABI stated that the cost of the floods in Cumbria and Scotland could exceed £100,000,000.

In Republic of Ireland, the Taoiseach Brian Cowen stated that the Government's priority was the provision of shelter and safe drinking water for those affected by the flooding. He chaired two sessions of the Emergency Response Co-Ordination Committee on the weekend following the outbreak of the floods.

Brian Cowen embarked on the first of his visits to Ireland's flood-affected areas on 23 November when he visited Clonmel, Cork, Ennis and Ballinasloe. The Taoiseach, taking a further half-day trip around Galway, Offaly, Roscommon and Westmeath to inspect flood-affected regions on 26 November, was confronted by the angry residents of Athlone who said he was using their plight as a "publicity stunt". Cowen refused to visit some of the most badly flooded areas of Athlone despite being offered a pair of waders and even a rowing boat.

I have the waders in my hand. We had a boat there ready for him. And he goes to a house there with just puddles.

— Athlone resident expressing her disgust at Brian Cowen

On 27 November, the Prince of Wales (now Charles III) visited the areas of Cumbria affected by the flooding, where he expressed "nothing but the greatest possible sympathy" for the victims of the flooding.

On 21 December, President Mary McAleese embarked on a two-day visit of flooded areas, praising the "utterly selfless" acts of those who were assisting.

== Aftermath of UK floods ==
As a result of the loss of all road and footbridges in Workington, it was announced that a new temporary railway station, Workington North, would be built on waste land leased for two years from Allerdale Council. The station opened on 30 November with services provided by Northern Rail. and remained open for a year.

Construction work began in late November on Barker Crossing, a temporary footbridge, constructed by the British Army's Corps of Royal Engineers involving over two hundred soldiers. The bridge was expected to take ten days to complete. It was constructed to provide a link across the River Derwent after the Northside Bridge collapsed and the Calva Bridge was condemned. The replacement bridge is 52 metres (171 ft) long, and weighs about 110 tonnes (108 long tons). It was prefabricated at Halton Camp, near Halton-with-Aughton and was erected on-site in early December. The bridge was opened to pedestrians on 7 December 2009.

On 26 November, three vehicles were observed driving over the closed Calva Bridge, Workington. The bridge had been closed by the use of temporary barriers. As a result of the incident, more substantial barriers were installed to prevent vehicles accessing the bridge.

Hundreds of mourners attended the funeral of PC Bill Barker in Egremont on 27 November 2009. Barker died after the collapse of a bridge in Workington.

In December 2009, Tesco built a new temporary store in north Workington. People living in that part of town were finding it difficult to access the main store, which lies south of the River Derwent.

On 22 October 2012, Princess Anne opened the new permanent road bridge on the site of the original Northside Bridge almost three years after its collapse. There had been calls to name the new bridge after PC Bill Barker however after the Town Council ran a local poll it was discovered that the residents would rather have it reverted to the old bridge's name, Northside Bridge. The final decision was then taken to PC Barker's widow who let the people of Workington decide.

== Relief effort in Ireland ==
An initial emergency relief fund of €10 million plus an extra €2 million especially for farmers was announced by the Irish government on the afternoon of 24 November. In Ireland's Budget 2010, delivered by Minister for Finance Brian Lenihan on 9 December 2009, a further minimum amount of at least €70 million was put towards those affected by the floods and to the prevention of similar disasters in future.

The Irish Red Cross stated that it expected to raise €1 million for survivors of the flooding and that it was starting to take applications for assistance from them on 12 December 2009. The organisation announced it had reached this total on 10 January 2010. The Society of Saint Vincent de Paul had two warehouses in Galway to collect aid for survivors. The Cork Flood Appeal Benefit Night was one fund-raising event which was held on 15 December 2009. Home Athlone was another event held on 21 December 2009.

== See also ==
- List of natural disasters in Britain and Ireland
- UK rainfall records
- February 2009 Great Britain and Ireland snowfall
- Climate of the United Kingdom, Climate of Europe
- Effects of global warming, Physical impacts of climate change
- Global storm activity of 2009, Global storm activity of 2010
- Winter of 2009–2010 in Europe
- 2009 Workington floods
