= A596 road =

Road in Cumbria, England

Coordinates: 54.7621°N 3.3390°W

A596

Major junctions
- From: A595 in Thursby

- To: A595 in Workington

Location
- Country: United Kingdom

Road network
- Roads in the United Kingdom; Motorways; A and B road zones

The A596 is a primary route in Cumbria, in northern England, that runs between Thursby (5 miles (8.0 km) north-east of Wigton) and Workington. For its entirety the A596 parallels the A595, and meets the A595 at both ends. The A596 begins its course at a roundabout junction with the A595 at Thursby, before continuing past the towns of Wigton and Aspatria. As it travels further towards the coast, it reaches the town of Maryport, where there is a junction to the B5300 heading up the coast to Silloth via Allonby, Mawbray, and Beckfoot. It then crosses over the River Derwent, skirting the eastern edge of Workington shortly before terminating at the junction with the A595 at Lillyhall.

== Incidents ==
=== November 2009 Great Britain and Ireland floods ===
Workington Bridge on the A596 was closed after the November 2009 Great Britain and Ireland floods as were many other roads across the River Derwent. A temporary station, called Workington North was constructed north of the Derwent to provide access to the town to those cut off by road.
