= Workington North railway station =

Former railway station in Cumbria, England

Workington North
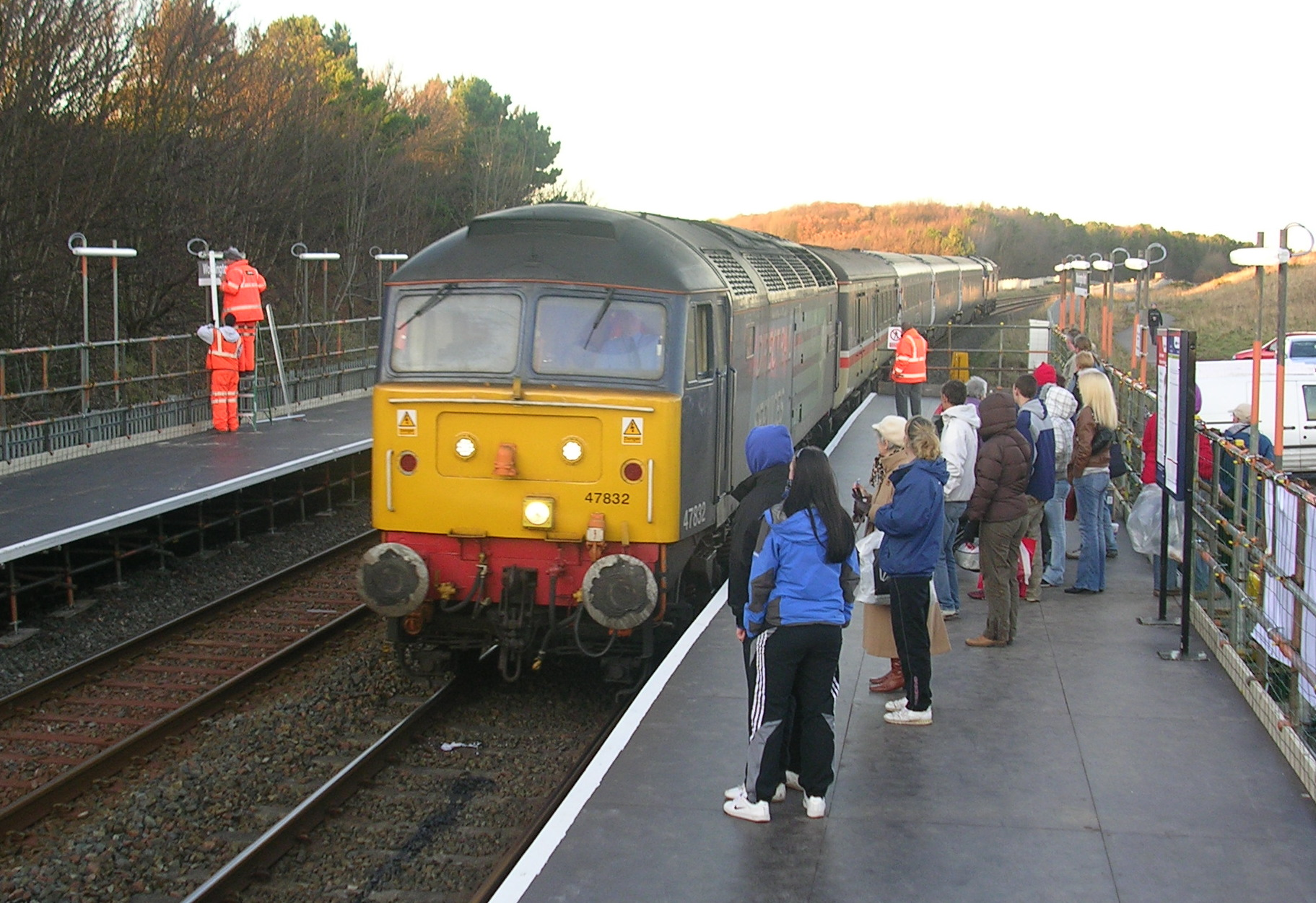
- Direct Rail Services 47832 arrives with a shuttle service

General information
- Location: Workington, Cumberland; England
- Coordinates: 54.6578°N 3.5563°W
- Grid reference: NX996303
- Platforms: 2

Other information
- Status: Disused

History
- Post-grouping: Network Rail

Key dates
- 30 November 2009: Opened
- 8 October 2010: Closed
Location
- Location within the former Allerdale Borough Location within Cumbria

Workington North railway station was a temporary railway station in Cumbria, England, constructed following floods which cut all road access to Workington town centre from north of the River Derwent. The station was located 1 mile (1.6 km) north of Workington station on the Cumbrian Coast Line.

Until the new station opened, the closest station north of the River Derwent was Flimby railway station, which saw its passenger numbers increase enormously after the floods. Flimby had seen as many passengers on 24 November 2009 as would usually use the station in a fortnight. When the station first opened access to Workington by road from Northside involved a journey of 30 miles (48 km) because the bridges over the River Derwent for the A596 and A597 roads were destroyed or badly damaged by the flood. The construction of a temporary road bridge over the Derwent made vehicular access easier but the railway station remained open until 8 October 2010, when the last train called.

== Construction ==
Network Rail began construction of the new station during the night of 24/25 November 2009. The station featured two platforms linked by a footbridge, a waiting room, and a gravel car park. Network Rail agreed a two-year lease of land owned by Allerdale Borough Council off the A596 immediately north of St Helens Business Park, opposite Dunmail Park shopping centre.

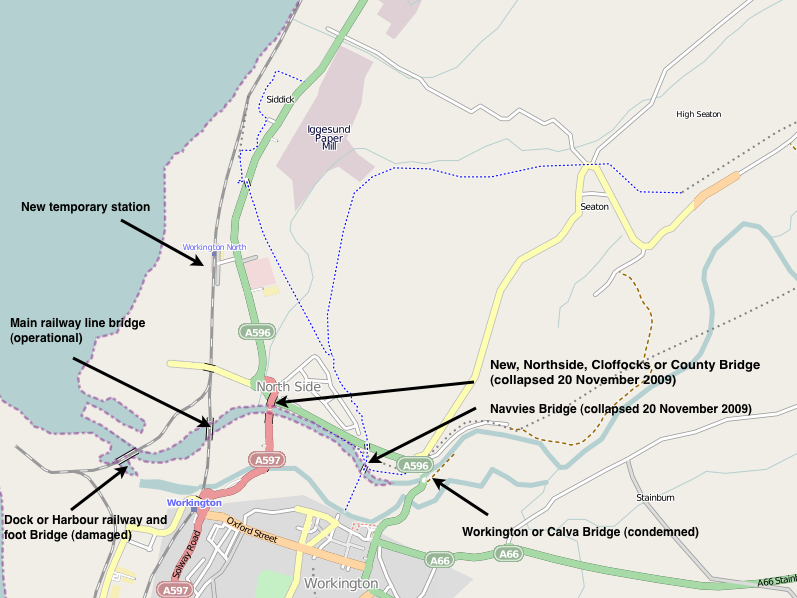
Map showing the location of the stations and the damaged bridges

The structure used a scaffolding base covered by wooden planks with an anti-slip surfacing. Construction work was undertaken "round the clock" in order to get the new station opened. The southbound platform was completed on 26 November, and the northbound platform and footbridge were completed by 28 November. The station opened on 30 November 2009, construction having taken six days.

Prince Charles visited the station on 27 November 2009 to inspect the construction work being undertaken as part of a visit to the region.

Once opened, the station was served by all existing trains and an additional hourly shuttle train (composed of a locomotive and at least three former inter-city mainline coaches) operated by Cumbrian-based Direct Rail Services (DRS) on behalf of Northern Rail—running northbound to Maryport and southbound to Workington. This service started on 30 November 2009 and ran until 28 May 2010. It was initially funded by the Department for Transport at a cost of £216,000. All services between Workington, Workington North, Flimby and Maryport were free of charge for this period.

== Services ==
Services from the station were operated by Northern Rail and Direct Rail Services. All trains on the line in both directions would call additionally at the new station. There was generally an hourly service northbound to Carlisle and southbound to Whitehaven station with some trains going onwards to Barrow-in-Furness. On Sundays three trains per day went to Carlisle and Whitehaven stations.

Preceding station	Historical railways	Following station
Flimby Line and station open	Northern Rail Cumbrian Coast Line	Workington Line and station open
