= Allerdale Borough Council elections =

Local government elections in Cumbria, England

The election of councillors to Allerdale Borough Council in Cumbria, England took place every four years. The council was established in 1974 and it was abolished in 2023. The last elections were in 2019.

At the 1999 boundary review, there were 56 councillors in 31 wards. This changed in 2019 following another boundary review. The number of councillors was reduced to 49 and the number of wards reduced to 23.

== Political control ==
The first election to the council was held in 1973, initially operating as a shadow authority alongside the outgoing authorities until the new arrangements came into effect on 1 April 1974. Political control of the council from 1974 until its abolition in 2023 was as follows:

Party in control	Years
No overall control	1974–1991
Labour	1991–2003
No overall control	2003–2023

=== Leadership ===
The leaders of the council from 2003 until the council's abolition in 2023 were:

Councillor	Party	From	To
Mark Fryer	Labour		May 2003
Jim Musgrave	Labour	May 2003	May 2007
Joe Milburn	Conservative	24 May 2007	May 2009
Tim Heslop	Conservative	20 May 2009	May 2011
Alan Smith	Labour	18 May 2011	May 2019
Marion Fitzgerald	Independent	22 May 2019	21 Feb 2020
Mike Johnson (Note: As deputy leader, assumed leadership duties from 21 February 2020, but not formally confirmed as leader himself until 3 March 2021.)	Conservative	3 Mar 2021	31 Mar 2023

== Council elections ==
- 1973 Allerdale District Council election
- 1976 Allerdale District Council election
- 1979 Allerdale District Council election (New ward boundaries)
- 1983 Allerdale District Council election
- 1987 Allerdale District Council election (District boundary changes took place but the number of seats remained the same)
- 1991 Allerdale District Council election
- 1995 Allerdale Borough Council election
- 1999 Allerdale Borough Council election (New ward boundaries increased the number of seat by 1)
- 2003 Allerdale Borough Council election
- 2007 Allerdale Borough Council election
- 2011 Allerdale Borough Council election
- 2015 Allerdale Borough Council election
- 2019 Allerdale Borough Council election (New ward boundaries)

== Election results ==
	Overall control	Conservative	Labour	Lib Dems	PCF	UKIP	Independent
2019	NOC	15	14	-	1	-	20
2015	NOC	17	28	-	-	3	8
2011	NOC	12	28	-	-	-	16
2007	NOC	19	21	4	-	-	12
2003	NOC	15	27	5	-	-	9
1999	Labour	8	33	7	-	-	5

== Borough result maps ==
1999 results map

2003 results map

2007 results map

2011 results map

2015 results map

2019 results map

== By-election results ==
=== 1995-1999 ===
Ellen By-Election 6 March 1997
Party	Candidate	Votes	%	±%
Labour		207	42.0	
Liberal Democrats		148	30.0	
Independent		138	28.0	
Majority		59	12.0	
Turnout		493	31.0	
Labour hold		Swing		

Salterbeck By-Election 6 March 1997
Party	Candidate	Votes	%	±%
Labour		537	89.6	
Liberal Democrats		62	10.4	
Majority		475	79.2	
Turnout		599	30.0	
Labour hold		Swing		

Broughton By-Election 18 September 1997
Party	Candidate	Votes	%	±%
Labour		489	88.6	
Conservative		63	11.4	
Majority		426	77.2	
Turnout		552	42.0	
Labour hold		Swing		

Moorclose By-Election 18 September 1997
Party	Candidate	Votes	%	±%
Labour		525	59.7	−9.4
Liberal Democrats		355	40.3	+9.4
Majority		170	19.4	
Turnout		880	29.0	
Labour hold		Swing		

St Johns By-Election 18 September 1997
Party	Candidate	Votes	%	±%
Labour		436	53.4	−10.6
Conservative		381	46.6	+10.6
Majority		55	6.8	
Turnout		817	23.5	
Labour hold		Swing		

Stainburn By-Election 18 September 1997
Party	Candidate	Votes	%	±%
Labour		259	51.1	−3.0
Conservative		248	48.9	+3.0
Majority		11	2.2	
Turnout		507	22.0	
Labour hold		Swing		

Keswick By-Election 26 March 1998
Party	Candidate	Votes	%	±%
Liberal Democrats		648	45.7	
Conservative		388	27.4	
Labour		331	23.3	
Independent		51	3.6	
Majority		260	28.3	
Turnout		1,418	34.2	
Liberal Democrats gain from Conservative		Swing		

St Michaels By-Election 7 May 1998
Party	Candidate	Votes	%	±%
Labour		658	74.2	+2.9
Conservative		229	25.8	+25.8
Majority		429	48.4	
Turnout		887		
Labour hold		Swing		

Salterbeck By-Election 27 August 1998
Party	Candidate	Votes	%	±%
Labour		unopposed		
Labour hold		Swing		

=== 1999-2003 ===
Moorclose By-Election 1 July 1999 (3)
Party	Candidate	Votes	%	±%
Labour	Joan Minto	906		
Labour	Peter Bales	888		
Labour	Philip Tibble	770		
Liberal Democrats	John Morley	289		
Liberal Democrats	Mark Hayton	255		
Liberal Democrats	Bertha Wright	225		
Conservative	Simon Collins	220		
Turnout		3,553	24	
Labour hold		Swing		
Labour hold		Swing		

Waver By-Election 20 September 2001
Party	Candidate	Votes	%	±%
Liberal Democrats	Patrick Short	119	67.6	+67.6
Independent	Gordon Hanning	57	32.4	−44.9
Majority		62	35.2	
Turnout		176	12.5	
Liberal Democrats gain from Independent		Swing		

=== 2003-2007 ===
Solway By-Election 19 June 2003
Party	Candidate	Votes	%	±%
Conservative	James Buchanan	274	57.3	
Independent	Dorothy Tinnion	87	18.2	
Independent	Janice Nott	69	14.4	
Labour	Mark Kidd	48	10.0	
Majority		187	39.1	
Turnout		478	36.3	
Conservative gain from Labour		Swing		

Wampool By-Election 1 April 2004
Party	Candidate	Votes	%	±%
Conservative	Stuart Moffat	308	69.7	
Liberal Democrats	Davis Black	96	21.7	
Labour	Christine Smith	38	8.6	
Majority		212	48.0	
Turnout		442	31.3	
Conservative gain from Liberal Democrats		Swing		

Wharrels By-Election 18 August 2005
Party	Candidate	Votes	%	±%
Conservative	Jacqueline Mounsey	unopposed		
Conservative hold		Swing		

Waver By-Election 8 September 2005
Party	Candidate	Votes	%	±%
Conservative	John Hunter	220	82.4	+82.4
Independent	Charles Miles	47	17.6	−42.3
Majority		173	64.8	
Turnout		267	18.8	
Conservative gain from Independent		Swing		

Marsh By-Election 3 November 2005
Party	Candidate	Votes	%	±%
Conservative	Vaughan Hodgson	213	61.9	
Liberal Democrats	Peter Barker	131	38.1	
Majority		82	23.8	
Turnout		344	26.8	
Conservative gain from Liberal Democrats		Swing		

Dalton By-Election 24 November 2005
Party	Candidate	Votes	%	±%
Conservative	Chris Garrard	220	72.6	
Labour	Bill Bacon	83	27.4	
Majority		137	45.2	
Turnout		303	22.1	
Conservative hold		Swing		

=== 2007-2011 ===
All Saints By-Election 5 June 2008
Party	Candidate	Votes	%	±%
Conservative	Alan Tyson	587	45.0	−1.8
Labour	Christine Smith	536	41.1	−12.2
BNP	Paul Stafford	99	7.6	+7.6
Green	Helen Graham	58	4.4	+4.4
Independent	Eddie Woodthorpe	25	1.9	+1.9
Majority		51	3.9	
Turnout		1,305	36	
Conservative hold		Swing		

Workington St John's By-Election 30 October 2008
Party	Candidate	Votes	%	±%
Labour	Gerald Humes	452	35.6	−14.7
Conservative	Simon Collins	394	31.0	−18.7
BNP	Clive Jefferson	257	20.2	+20.2
Independent	John Bracken	113	8.9	+8.9
Green	Alistair Grey	55	4.3	+4.3
Majority		58	4.6	
Turnout		1,271	30.0	
Labour gain from Conservative		Swing		

Christchurch By-Election 19 August 2010
Party	Candidate	Votes	%	±%
Conservative	Roy Swindells	466	66.1	+0.9
Liberal Democrats	Roger Peck	131	18.6	+18.6
Green	Bob Edwards	108	15.3	+15.3
Majority		335	47.5	
Turnout		705	24.1	
Conservative hold		Swing		

=== 2011-2015 ===
Keswick By-Election 1 September 2011
Party	Candidate	Votes	%	±%
Liberal Democrats	Martin Pugmire	757	59.7	
Labour	Tony Lywood	448	35.3	
Green	Flic Crowley	63	5.0	
Majority		309	24.4	
Turnout		1,268	31.9	
Liberal Democrats gain from Independent		Swing		

Derwent Valley By-Election 2 May 2013
Party	Candidate	Votes	%	±%
Conservative	Hilary Hope	225	49.3	−25.1
UKIP	Mark Jenkinson	92	20.2	+20.2
Green	Geoff Smith	82	18.0	+18.0
Labour	Andrew Lawson	57	12.5	−13.1
Majority		133	29.2	
Turnout		456		
Conservative hold		Swing		

Wampool By-Election 2 May 2013
Party	Candidate	Votes	%	±%
Conservative	Patricia Macdonald	195	41.1	−34.1
UKIP	Robert Hardon	102	21.5	+21.5
Independent	Marion Fitzgerald	98	20.7	+20.7
Green	Jill Perry	40	8.4	+8.4
Liberal Democrats	Charles Miles	39	8.2	+8.2
Majority		93	19.6	
Turnout		474		
Conservative hold		Swing		

Boltons By-Election 20 June 2013
Party	Candidate	Votes	%	±%
Independent	Marion Fitzgerald	175	35.7	+35.7
Conservative	Colin Smithson	157	32.0	−1.8
Independent	Mary Mumberson	103	21.0	+21.0
Green	Dianne Standen	55	11.2	+11.2
Majority		18	3.7	
Turnout		490		
Independent hold		Swing		

Seaton By-Election 14 November 2013
Party	Candidate	Votes	%	±%
Labour	Andrew Lawson	464	40.0	+3.6
UKIP	Mark Jenkinson	426	36.7	+36.7
Conservative	Mike Davidson	133	11.5	+11.5
Green	Alistair Grey	108	9.3	−4.9
Liberal Democrats	Chris Snowden	30	2.6	+2.6
Majority		38	3.3	
Turnout		1,161		
Labour gain from Independent		Swing		

=== 2015-2019 ===
Dalton by-election 24 March 2016
Party	Candidate	Votes	%	±%
Independent	Marion Fitzgerald	133	31.7	+31.7
Labour	Ross Hayman	118	28.2	+28.2
Conservative	Mike Johnson	93	22.2	−26.0
UKIP	Eric Atkinson	53	12.6	−1.9
Green	Flic Crowley	22	5.3	−10.6
Majority		15	3.6	
Turnout		419		
Independent gain from Conservative		Swing		

Moss Bay by-election 24 March 2016
Party	Candidate	Votes	%	±%
Labour	Frank Johnston	411	64.9	N/A
UKIP	Bob Hardon	189	29.9	N/A
Conservative	Louise Donnelly	33	5.2	N/A
Majority		222	35.1	
Turnout		633		
Labour hold		Swing		

Christchurch by-election 22 September 2016
Party	Candidate	Votes	%	±%
Labour	Joan Ellis	324	40.7	+5.8
Liberal Democrats	Debbie Taylor	234	29.4	+20.0
Conservative	Simon Nicholson	206	25.9	−19.3
UKIP	Eric Atkinson	32	4.0	+4.0
Majority		90	11.3	
Turnout		800		
Labour gain from Conservative		Swing		

=== 2019-2023 ===
Aspatria by-election 6 May 2021
Party	Candidate	Votes	%	±%
Independent	Kevin Thurlow	531	50.4	+50.4
Conservative	Lucy Winter	344	32.6	−8.2
Labour	Billy Miskelly	158	15.0	−9.3
Workers Party	Glenn Doncaster	21	2.0	+2.0
Majority		187	17.7	
Turnout		1,054		
Independent gain from Putting Cumbria First		Swing		

Christchurch by-election 6 May 2021
Party	Candidate	Votes	%	±%
Conservative	Alan Kennon	623	48.6	+1.8
Labour	Helen Tucker	378	29.5	−23.7
Liberal Democrats	Stephen Barnes	248	19.3	+19.3
Independent	Russ Cockburn	21	1.6	+1.6
For Britain	Eric Atkinson	12	0.9	+0.9
Majority		245	19.1	
Turnout		1,282		
Conservative gain from Labour		Swing		

Ellen and Gilcrux by-election 6 May 2021
Party	Candidate	Votes	%	±%
Conservative	Patrick Gorrill	343	39.4	+3.8
Labour	Martin Harris	285	32.7	−12.4
Independent	Scott Blagg	193	22.2	+22.2
Green	Dianne Standen	38	4.4	−14.9
Liberal Democrats	Margrit Scott	12	1.4	+1.4
Majority		58	6.7	
Turnout		871		
Conservative gain from Labour		Swing		

St John's by-election 6 May 2021
Party	Candidate	Votes	%	±%
Labour	Antony McGuckin	513	38.3	+10.0
Conservative	Debbie Garton	451	33.7	+22.7
Independent	Andrew Eccles	250	18.7	+18.7
Independent	George Campbell	55	4.1	+4.1
Liberal Democrats	Margaret Bennett	41	3.1	−4.9
Green	Alison Parker	30	2.2	−2.8
Majority		62	4.6	
Turnout		1,340		
Labour gain from Independent		Swing		

Seaton and Northside by-election 6 May 2021
Party	Candidate	Votes	%	±%
Conservative	Colin Sharpe	629	41.5	+15.8
Independent	Aileen Brown	415	27.4	+27.4
Labour	Beth Dixon	395	26.1	+2.0
Green	Alistair Grey	48	2.2	−5.2
Liberal Democrats	Andrew Murray	27	1.8	+1.8
Majority		214	14.1	
Turnout		1,514		
Conservative hold		Swing		

Maryport South by-election 25 November 2021
Party	Candidate	Votes	%	±%
Labour	Bill Pegram	273	52.9	+10.2
Independent	Eric Galletly	149	28.9	+28.9
Conservative	Steve Newton	94	18.2	+11.4
Majority		124	24.0	
Turnout		516		
Labour gain from Independent		Swing		

Stainburn and Clifton by-election 17 February 2022
Party	Candidate	Votes	%	±%
Labour	Jimmy Grisdale	354	54.6	+25.1
Conservative	Jacqueline Kirkbride	294	45.4	+28.3
Majority		60	9.3	
Turnout		648		
Labour gain from Independent		Swing		

St Michael's by-election 5 May 2022
Party	Candidate	Votes	%	±%
Labour	Barbara Cannon	454	49.8	+11.3
Independent	Ralph Hunter	278	30.5	+30.5
Conservative	John Connell	179	19.6	+10.1
Majority		176	19.3	
Turnout		911		
Labour hold		Swing		
