= Eden District Council elections =

Local government elections in Cumbria, England

Eden District Council in Cumbria, England was elected every four years.

The council was established in 1974 and abolished in 2023.

== Political control ==
The first election to the council was held in 1973, initially operating as a shadow authority alongside the outgoing authorities until the new arrangements came into effect on 1 April 1974. Political control of the council from 1974 until its abolition in 2023 was as follows:

Party in control	Years
Independent	1974–2007
No overall control	2007–2008
Independent	2008–2015
Conservative	2015–2019
No overall control	2019–2023

=== Leadership ===
In 2002, following the Local Government Act 2000, the council adopted the "alternative arrangements" style of governance, as was permitted for authorities with under 85,000 residents. Eden's alternative arrangements were said to be unique within England for not having a single nominated leader, but instead having a group of four joint leaders, each of whom chaired one of the council's four main committees. The arrangement lasted for six years. In 2008, the council changed to a leader and cabinet model instead, with a single leader. The leaders of the council from 2008 until the council's abolition in 2023 were:

Councillor	Party	From	To
Colin Nineham	Independent	29 May 2008	25 Aug 2009
Keith Phillips	Independent	1 Sep 2009	31 Mar 2010
Gordon Nicolson	Conservative	1 Apr 2010	May 2015
Kevin Beaty	Conservative	21 May 2015	May 2019
Virginia Taylor	Liberal Democrats	16 May 2019	31 Mar 2023

== Council elections ==
- 1973 Eden District Council election
- 1976 Eden District Council election
- 1979 Eden District Council election (New ward boundaries)
- 1983 Eden District Council election
- 1987 Eden District Council election
- 1991 Eden District Council election (District boundary changes took place but the number of seats remained the same)
- 1995 Eden District Council election
- 1999 Eden District Council election (New ward boundaries increased the number of seats by 1)
- 2003 Eden District Council election
- 2007 Eden District Council election
- 2011 Eden District Council election
- 2015 Eden District Council election
- 2019 Eden District Council election

== Results maps ==
2003 results map

2007 results map

2011 results map

2015 results map

2019 results map

== By-election results ==
=== 1999-2003 ===
Penrith West By-Election 26 October 2000
Party	Candidate	Votes	%	±%
Conservative		100	36.9	+36.9
Independent		89	32.8	−31.4
Labour		82	30.3	−5.5
Majority		11	4.1	
Turnout		271	12.9	
Conservative gain from Labour		Swing		

Hesket By-Election 18 April 2002
Party	Candidate	Votes	%	±%
Independent		294	37.9	−1.2
Conservative		245	31.6	+5.0
Liberal Democrats		237	30.5	+8.9
Majority		49	6.3	
Turnout		776	36.7	
Independent gain from Conservative		Swing		

Penrith North By-Election 18 April 2002
Party	Candidate	Votes	%	±%
Independent		255	49.4	+14.4
Conservative		186	36.0	+12.1
Liberal Democrats		175	33.9	+10.2
Majority		69	13.4	
Turnout		616	18.0	
Independent gain from Conservative		Swing		

=== 2003-2007 ===
Kirkby Stephen By-Election 19 June 2003
Party	Candidate	Votes	%	±%
Liberal Democrats	Mark Saunders	384	59.5	
Conservative	Barbara Dowson	186	28.8	
Independent	Simon Bennett	75	11.6	
Majority		198	30.7	
Turnout		645	32.8	
Liberal Democrats hold		Swing		

Ullswater By-Election 26 June 2003
Party	Candidate	Votes	%	±%
Conservative	Sydney Simpson	198	60.2	
Independent	Jean Wildish	107	32.5	
Labour	Christopher Bagshaw	24	7.3	
Majority		91	27.7	
Turnout		329	30.4	
Conservative gain from Liberal Democrats		Swing		

Ravenstonedale By-Election 19 February 2004
Party	Candidate	Votes	%	±%
Conservative	Michael Metcalfe-Gibson	192	51.5	
Liberal Democrats	John Raw	129	34.6	
Independent	Jane Brook	52	13.9	
Majority		63	16.9	
Turnout		373	52.0	
Conservative gain from Independent		Swing		

Askham By-Election 24 February 2005
Party	Candidate	Votes	%	±%
Conservative	Joan Lowis	206	55.1	+55.1
Independent	Colin Warren	91	24.3	−43.3
Liberal Democrats	Stuart Hughes	77	20.6	−11.8
Majority		115	30.8	
Turnout		374	35.5	
Conservative gain from Independent		Swing		

Crosby Ravensworth By-Election 8 June 2006
Party	Candidate	Votes	%	±%
Conservative	Joan Raine	211	39.7	
Independent	Brian Morris	185	34.8	
Liberal Democrats	Margaret Wilcox	135	25.4	
Majority		26	4.9	
Turnout		531	47.7	
Conservative gain from Independent		Swing		

Orton with Tebay By-Election 3 August 2006
Party	Candidate	Votes	%	±%
Liberal Democrats	Margaret Wilcox	165	50.5	+3.1
Conservative	Peter Knowles	162	49.5	+49.5
Majority		3	1.0	
Turnout		327	29.8	
Liberal Democrats gain from Independent		Swing		

Penrith Carleton By-Election 5 October 2006
Party	Candidate	Votes	%	±%
Liberal Democrats	Patricia Bell	223	54.1	
Conservative	Christopher Vipond	189	45.9	
Majority		34	11.8	
Turnout		412	32.8	
Liberal Democrats hold		Swing		

=== 2007-2011 ===
Morland By-Election 17 April 2008
Party	Candidate	Votes	%	±%
Independent	Michael Tonkin	198	52.1	+7.1
Conservative	Joan Savage	108	28.4	−26.6
Liberal Democrats	John Turner	74	19.5	+19.5
Majority		90	23.7	
Turnout		380	38.1	
Independent gain from Liberal Democrats		Swing		

Penrith West By-Election 8 October 2009
Party	Candidate	Votes	%	±%
Liberal Democrats	Elissa Robinson	387	51.7	+51.7
Conservative	David Whipp	157	21.0	−17.6
BNP	Alistair Barbour	102	13.6	+13.6
Independent	Rebecca Taylor	58	7.8	−37.5
Labour	Geoffrey Rockliffe-King	26	3.5	−12.7
Green	Alan Marsden	18	2.4	+2.4
Majority		230	30.7	
Turnout		748	31.8	
Liberal Democrats gain from Independent		Swing		

=== 2015-2019 ===
Alston Moor by-election 4 August 2016
Party	Candidate	Votes	%	±%
Liberal Democrats	Thomas Sheriff	302	54.6	N/A
Conservative	Stephen Harrison	251	45.4	+15.7
Majority		51	9.2	
Turnout		556	34	
Liberal Democrats gain from Conservative		Swing		

The by-election was triggered by the resignation of Councillor David Hymers.

Alston Moor by-election 20 July 2017
Party	Candidate	Votes	%	±%
Labour	Lizzie Sharp	407	55.8	n/a
Conservative	Jim Clapp	253	34.7	+5.1
Independent	Holly Ho	57	7.8	n/a
Green	Richard O'Brien	13	1.8	n/a
Majority		154	21.1	
Turnout		730	43.8	
Labour gain from Liberal Democrats		Swing		

The by-election was triggered by the resignation of Councillor Thomas Sheriff.

Penrith North by-election 16 November 2017
Party	Candidate	Votes	%	±%
Liberal Democrats	Mark Rudhall	422	45.2	+2.3
Conservative	John Forrester	291	31.2	−0.8
Labour	Karen Lockney	155	16.6	−8.5
Green	Douglas Lawson	65	7.0	+7.0
Majority		131	14.0	
Turnout		933		
Liberal Democrats hold		Swing		

Hartside by-election 18 February 2018
Party	Candidate	Votes	%	±%
Conservative	Robin Orchard	175	52.9	−3.8
Independent	Susan Castle-Clarke	98	29.6	−13.7
Green	Richard Henry	58	17.5	+17.5
Majority		77	23.3	
Turnout		331		
Conservative hold		Swing		

=== 2019-2023 ===
Penrith South by-election 5 September 2019
Party	Candidate	Votes	%	±%
Conservative	Helen Fearon	222	46.3	+7.6
Independent	Lee Quinn	189	39.4	−8.7
Labour	Dave Knaggs	46	9.6	−7.7
Putting Cumbria First	Kerryanne Wilde	23	4.8	+4.8
Majority		33	6.9	
Turnout		480		
Conservative gain from Independent		Swing		

Shap by-election 14 November 2019
Party	Candidate	Votes	%	±%
Liberal Democrats	Neil McCall	184	48.5	+17.2
Conservative	Sean Quinn	128	33.8	−17.3
Putting Cumbria First	Kerryanne Wilde	67	17.7	+0.1
Majority		56	14.8	
Turnout		379		
Liberal Democrats gain from Conservative		Swing		

Hartside by-election 6 May 2021
Party	Candidate	Votes	%	±%
Conservative	Raymond Briggs	194	45.1	N/A
Independent	Susan Castle-Clarke	101	23.5	N/A
Labour	Dave Knaggs	94	21.9	N/A
Independent	Nikita Parks	41	9.5	N/A
Majority		93	21.6	
Turnout		430		
Conservative hold		Swing		

Skelton by-election 6 May 2021
Party	Candidate	Votes	%	±%
Conservative	Colin Atkinson	302	54.4	−5.8
Liberal Democrats	Roger Burgin	131	23.6	−16.2
Green	Belinda Lloyd	81	14.6	+14.6
Labour	Hilary Snell	41	7.4	+7.4
Majority		171	30.8	
Turnout		555		
Conservative hold		Swing		

Penrith West by-election 30 September 2021
Party	Candidate	Votes	%	±%
Liberal Democrats	Roger Burgin	173	43.5	−7.6
Conservative	Dale Normington	87	21.9	−6.8
Independent	Jeff Thomson	51	12.8	+12.8
Labour	Dave Knaggs	40	10.1	−17.7
Putting Cumbria First	Jonathan Davies	28	7.0	+7.0
Green	Richard O'Brien	19	4.8	+4.8
Majority		86	21.6	
Turnout		398		
Liberal Democrats gain from Conservative		Swing		
