= Arkleby =

Village in Cumbria, England

Coordinates: 54.73°N 3.33°W

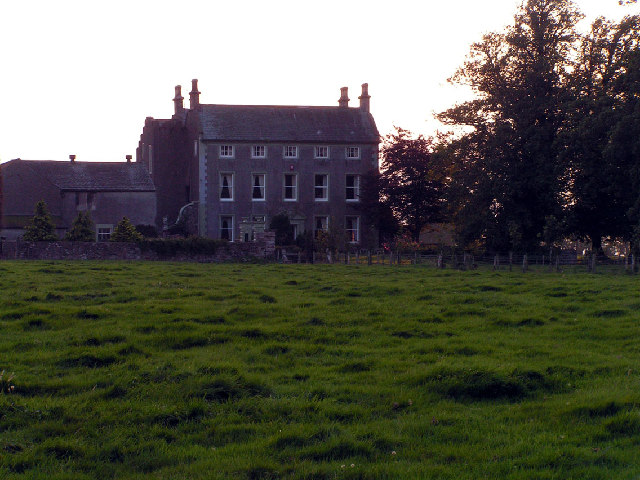
- Arkleby Hall

- Location in Allerdale, Cumbria Location within Cumbria
- OS grid reference: NY1439
- Civil parish: Plumbland
- Unitary authority: Cumberland
- Ceremonial county: Cumbria
- Region: North West
- Country: England
- Sovereign state: United Kingdom
- Post town: WIGTON
- Postcode district: CA7
- Dialling code: 01697
- Police: Cumbria
- Fire: Cumbria
- Ambulance: North West
- UK Parliament: Penrith and Solway

Arkleby is a village in Cumbria, England. It is located about 1 mile south of Aspatria and 9 miles south-west of Wigton. Arkleby is part of the civil parish of Plumbland and is a short distance from the village of Parsonby and larger village of Plumbland. Arkleby Hall, a farmhouse, dates from 1725 and is a Grade II listed building. St Cuthbert's Church, the parish church of Plumbland, is located in between Arkleby and Parsonby. The church was built in 1871 by J.A. Cory, incorporating the fabric of an earlier 13th century church on the site; it is a Grade II listed building.

== See also ==
- Listed buildings in Plumbland
