= Listed buildings in Plumbland =

Plumbland is a civil parish in the Cumberland unitary authority area of Cumbria, England. It contains eleven listed buildings that are recorded in the National Heritage List for England. Of these, one is listed at Grade II*, the middle of the three grades, and the others are at Grade II, the lowest grade. The parish contains the village of Plumbland and the settlements of Threapland, Parsonby and Arkleby, and is otherwise rural. The listed buildings include houses and associated structures, a church, a dovecote, a bridge, a farmhouse, and a school later used as a village hall.

== Key ==
Grade	Criteria
II*	Particularly important buildings of more than special interest
II	Buildings of national importance and special interest

== Buildings ==
Name and location	Photograph	Date	Notes	Grade
Dovecote; 54.74006°N 3.33455°W	—	16th century (probable)	The dovecote was altered in the 19th century when it was used as a hearse house. It is in sandstone and has a hipped green slate roof. The south doorway is partly blocked, and the north door has been enlarged to take a hearse. Inside are the remains of stone alcoves for nesting.	II*
Garden wall and gate piers, Arkleby Hall; 54.74537°N 3.33290°W	—	Early 18th century	The wall runs along the garden to the east of the hall. It is a low rubble wall with saddleback coping. The wall ends in rusticated piers with cornices and shaped finials.	II
Walls and entrance gate piers, Arkleby Hall; 54.74606°N 3.33089°W	—	Early 18th century	The walls and gate piers flank the entrance to the drive of the hall. They are in St Bees sandstone. The quadrant walls have chamfered coping and iron railings. A pair of piers flank the gateway and another pair are at the ends of the walls. They are rusticated, and those flanking the wall have ball finials.	II
Arkleby Hall; 54.74533°N 3.33333°W		c.1740	A farmhouse that incorporates part of a 1725 house, it is rendered on a chamfered plinth, and has quoins, a cornice, and a green slate roof. The house has two storeys with an attic, and five bays. The windows are sashes in architraves; those in the attic are horizontally sliding. The doorway has a bolection architrave in a fluted plaster doorcase, and a segmental pediment containing a coat of arms. At the rear is a round-headed two-light staircase window. The flanking walls are shaped; the one on the left is surmounted by a griffin holding a coat of arms.	II
Church of England School; 54.73874°N 3.32871°W		1799	Originally a grammar school, it was altered in the 19th century, and has since been used as a village hall. It is rendered with sandstone angle pilasters, casement windows, and a green slate roof. The building has a roughly cross-shaped plan, it is in one storey, and has a clock tower incorporating a porch. The tower has three storeys, louvred vent openings, clock faces, and corner pinnacles.	II
Midtown Farmhouse; 54.73950°N 3.32180°W	—	Late 18th or early 19th century	The farmhouse is stuccoed on a chamfered plinth, and has quoins, a cornice, and a green slate roof with coped gables. There are two storeys and three bays, with a lower two-storey single-bay extension to the left. The doorway has an alternate-block surround and a patterned fanlight, and the windows are sashes in stone surrounds.	II
Ellenhall Bridge; 54.73891°N 3.37381°W		Early 19th century	The bridge carries a road over the River Ellen. It is in sandstone, and consists of two segmental arches with a central pier and splayed cutwaters. The bridge has a low parapet with saddleback coping.	II
Lane Head; 54.74003°N 3.32016°W	—	Early 19th century	A stuccoed house with quoins and a green slate roof. The wall at the left is hung with Welsh slate. The house has two storeys and three bays, with a lower two-storey single-bay extension to the left. The doorway has a plain surround and a bracketed cornice, and the windows are sashes in stone surrounds.	II
Plumbland House; 54.73784°N 3.32404°W	—	Early 19th century	The house is stuccoed on a chamfered plinth, with quoins, a dentilled parapet, and a green slate roof. It is in two storeys has a symmetrical front of three bays. The central doorway has a Tuscan doorcase and a fanlight, and the windows are sashes in stone surrounds. At the rear is a Venetian staircase window.	II
Gate piers and wall, Plumbland House; 54.73804°N 3.32427°W	—	Early 19th century	The wall is at the front of the garden of the house. It is a low stone wall and contains two pairs of gate piers. The piers are also in stone, they are polygonal with recessed panels, and are surmounted by urn finials.	II
St Cuthbert's Church; 54.74064°N 3.33501°W		1869–71	The church was designed by J. A. Cory and incorporates material from an earlier church on the site. It is in St Bees sandstone and calciferous sandstone and has green slate roofs with coped gables and cross finials. The church consists of a nave with a clerestory, aisles, a north organ chamber, a chancel with a north vestry, and a southwest tower incorporating a porch. The tower has three stages and a four-way-gabled top. The re-used items include the arch to the south doorway, and the chancel arch, which are both Norman, and the doorway to the vestry, which is Early English. The clerestory on the south side of the nave has three three-light gabled dormer windows.	II
