= 1999 Allerdale Borough Council election =

1999 UK local government election

Map of the results of the 1999 Allerdale council election. Labour in red, Conservatives in blue, Liberal Democrats in yellow and Independents in grey.

Elections to Allerdale Borough Council were held on 6 May 1999. The whole council was up for election with boundary changes since the last election in 1995 increasing the number of seats by 3. The Labour Party kept overall control of the council. The election for Moorclose ward was postponed until 1 July meaning 3 seats were vacant, see Allerdale local elections for the results.

== Result ==
Allerdale local election result 1999
Party	Seats	Gains	Losses	Net gain/loss	Seats %	Votes %	Votes	+/−
Labour	33			-3	56.6	52.1	18,239	
Conservative	8			+2	15.1	20.1	7,047	
Liberal Democrats	7			+3	13.2	15.5	5,431	
Independent	5			-2	15.1	11.7	4,090	
UKIP	0			0	0.0	0.5	173	

11 Labour and 1 Liberal Democrat candidates were uncontested.

== Ward results ==
All Saints Cockermouth (3)
Party	Candidate	Votes	%	±%
Labour	Mary Graham	756		
Labour	Alan Smith	658		
Conservative	Samuel Standage	610		
Conservative	Philip Butterworth	594		
Labour	John Millar	547		
Conservative	David Taylor	545		
Liberal Democrats	Mark Hayton	273		
Turnout		3,983		

Aspatria (2)
Party	Candidate	Votes	%	±%
Labour	Gerald Sewell	444		
Independent	Dorothy Tinnion	425		
Labour	John Vincent	335		
Liberal Democrats	Christopher Jackson	226		
Liberal Democrats	Gordon Hanning	167		
Turnout		1,597		

Boltons
Party	Candidate	Votes	%	±%
Independent	Joseph Mumberson	280	45.5	
Conservative	Kathleen Brandwood	248	40.3	
Labour	Peter Garner	87	14.1	
Majority		32	5.2	
Turnout		615	41	

Broughton St Bridgets (2)
Party	Candidate	Votes	%	±%
Labour	Keith Sproat	670		
Labour	James Askew	580		
Liberal Democrats	Beatrice Thorpe	347		
Independent	Christopher Harris	330		
Turnout		1,927		

Christchurch Cockermouth (2)
Party	Candidate	Votes	%	±%
Conservative	Christine Jackson	529		
Conservative	Leslie Lytollis	474		
Labour	Laurence Mansfield	361		
Labour	Christine Smith	325		
Liberal Democrats	Margaret Burgess	141		
Turnout		1,830		

Clifton
Party	Candidate	Votes	%	±%
Labour	Maureen Rourke	258	51.0	
Liberal Democrats	Bertha Wright	248	49.0	
Majority		10	2.0	
Turnout		506	41	

Crummock
Party	Candidate	Votes	%	±%
Conservative	Joseph Milburn	556	87.0	
Labour	William Whalley	83	13.0	
Majority		473	74.0	
Turnout		639	50	

Dalton
Party	Candidate	Votes	%	±%
Conservative	Janice Steel	305	71.4	
Labour	Nicholas Hardy	122	28.6	
Majority		183	42.8	
Turnout		427	33	

Derwent Valley
Party	Candidate	Votes	%	±%
Conservative	Timothy Heslop	383	79.1	
Labour	Edward Routledge	101	20.9	
Majority		282	58.2	
Turnout		484	35	

Ellen (2)
Party	Candidate	Votes	%	±%
Labour	John Colhoun	uncontested		
Labour	David Thomas	uncontested		

Ellenborough Maryport (2)
Party	Candidate	Votes	%	±%
Labour	Vincent Mulgrew	uncontested		
Labour	Martin Wood	uncontested		

Ewanrigg Maryport (2)
Party	Candidate	Votes	%	±%
Labour	Carneen McCarron-Holmes	uncontested		
Labour	Patricia McCracken	uncontested		

Flimby
Party	Candidate	Votes	%	±%
Labour	Peter Kendall	uncontested		

Harrington Workington (2)
Party	Candidate	Votes	%	±%
Liberal Democrats	Allan Caine	692		
Liberal Democrats	Ian Francis	547		
Labour	Barbara Weir	398		
Labour	James Osborn	318		
Turnout		1,955		

Holme
Party	Candidate	Votes	%	±%
Labour	Janice Wood	uncontested		

Keswick (3)
Party	Candidate	Votes	%	±%
Liberal Democrats	Elizabeth Barraclough	1,113		
Independent	Mavis Clark	1,094		
Labour	Pamela Edwards	533		
Conservative	William Healy	478		
UKIP	Peter Baden	173		
Turnout		3,391		

Marsh
Party	Candidate	Votes	%	±%
Liberal Democrats	Jennifer Gallagher	375	86.6	
Labour	Michael Gartland	58	13.4	
Majority		318	73.2	
Turnout		433	31	

Moss Bay Workington (3)
Party	Candidate	Votes	%	±%
Labour	Joan McKeown	629		
Labour	Lillian Baldry	627		
Labour	Joseph Robertson	555		
Independent	John Bracken	339		
Turnout		2,150		

Netherhall Maryport (2)
Party	Candidate	Votes	%	±%
Labour	Angela Kendall	uncontested		
Labour	Kevin Smith	uncontested		

Seaton (3)
Party	Candidate	Votes	%	±%
Labour	Mark Fryer	670		
Labour	James Musgrave	668		
Labour	Cecilia Tibble	604		
Independent	Trevor Fee	503		
Turnout		2,445		

Silloth (2)
Party	Candidate	Votes	%	±%
Independent	William Jefferson	671		
Labour	Margaret Snaith	528		
Labour	Nicholas Findley	289		
Turnout		1,488		

Solway
Party	Candidate	Votes	%	±%
Labour	Peter Deneberg	uncontested		

St Johns Workington (3)
Party	Candidate	Votes	%	±%
Labour	John Robertson	709		
Labour	Daniel Dempsey	704		
Labour	Derek Fagan	675		
Conservative	John Heathcote	672		
Conservative	William Hewitt	573		
Conservative	Simon Collins	547		
Turnout		3,880		

St Michaels Workington (3)
Party	Candidate	Votes	%	±%
Labour	Jack Fryer	945		
Labour	Alan Barry	932		
Labour	Ivor Humes	890		
Liberal Democrats	John Strong	269		
Turnout		3,036		

Stainburn Workington
Party	Candidate	Votes	%	±%
Conservative	Richard Jones	293	64.4	
Labour	Philip Tibble	162	35.6	
Majority		131	28.8	
Turnout		455	33	

Wampool
Party	Candidate	Votes	%	±%
Liberal Democrats	Anne Holmes	uncontested		

Warnell
Party	Candidate	Votes	%	±%
Liberal Democrats	Agnes Martin	378	70.8	
Labour	Peter Krebs	156	29.2	
Majority		222	41.6	
Turnout		534	33	

Waver
Party	Candidate	Votes	%	±%
Independent	John Huntington	330	77.3	
Labour	Isabella Walton	97	22.7	
Majority		233	54.6	
Turnout		427	30	

Wharrels
Party	Candidate	Votes	%	±%
Conservative	Robert Hobbs	240	50.2	
Labour	Derek Holmes	120	25.1	
Independent	William Powley	118	24.7	
Majority		120	25.1	
Turnout		478	37	

Wigton (3)
Party	Candidate	Votes	%	±%
Liberal Democrats	Gwendoline Steer	655		
Labour	Jack Graham	568		
Labour	John Crouch	555		
Labour	Kenneth Bell	522		
Turnout		2,300		
