= Bothel and Threapland =

Civil parish in Cumbria, England

Coordinates: 54.738°N 3.271°W

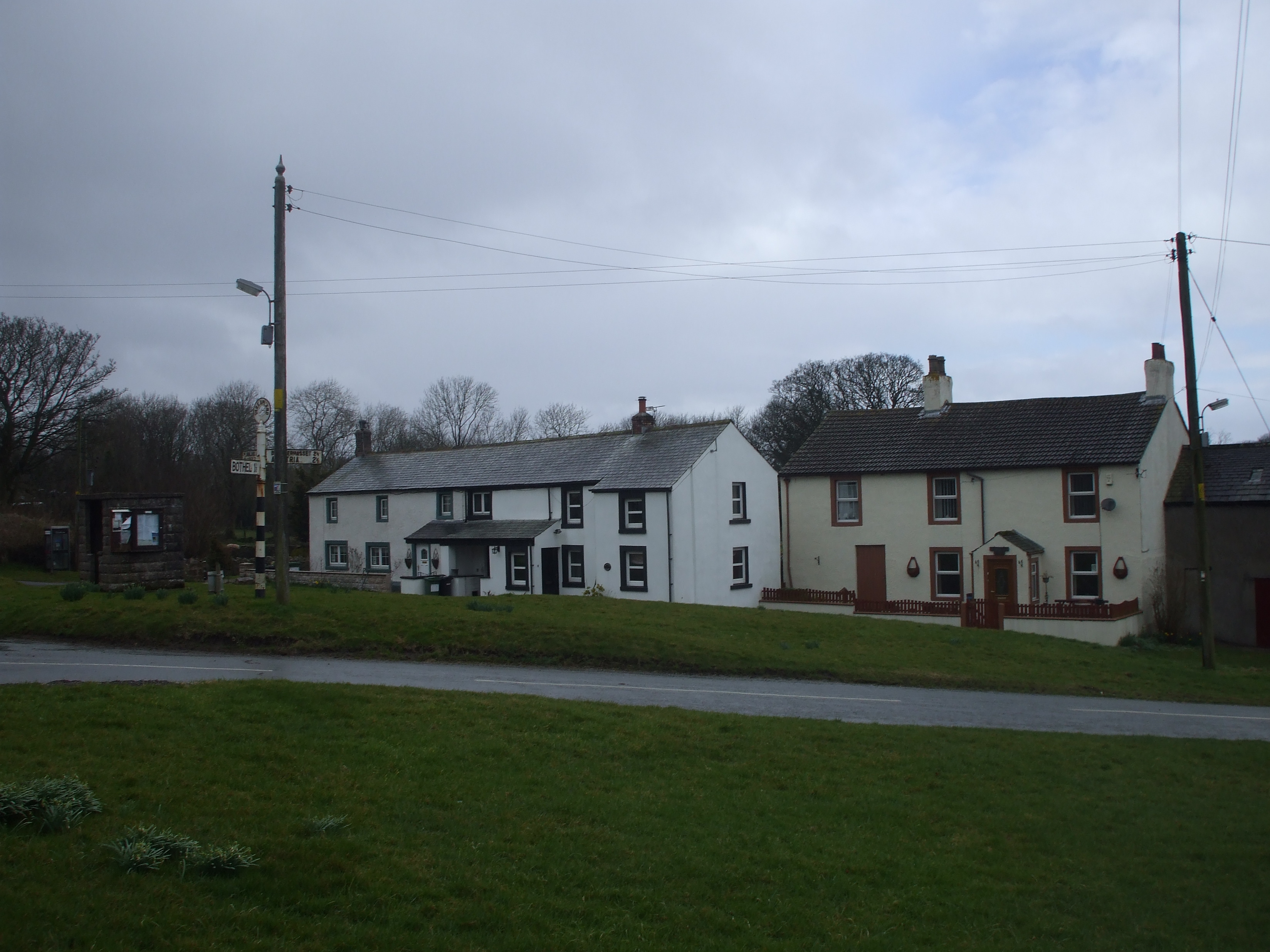
- Housing area of Bothel and Threapland, Cumbria

- Location in Allerdale, Cumbria Location within Cumbria
- Population: 483 (2011 census)
- OS grid reference: NY1817738866
- Civil parish: Bothel and Threapland
- Unitary authority: Cumberland
- Ceremonial county: Cumbria
- Region: North West
- Country: England
- Sovereign state: United Kingdom
- Post town: Wigton
- Postcode district: CA7
- Dialling code: 016973
- Police: Cumbria
- Fire: Cumbria
- Ambulance: North West

Bothel and Threapland is a civil parish in Cumbria, England, just outside the Lake District National Park. According to the 2001 census, it had a population of 438. The parish includes the villages of Bothel and Threapland. The village of Bothel is south-east of the parish of Aspatria and Threapland is south of Aspatria and Carlisle is eighteen miles (29 km) North-east of the parish. It had a population of 483 in the 2011 census figures.

== History and heritage ==
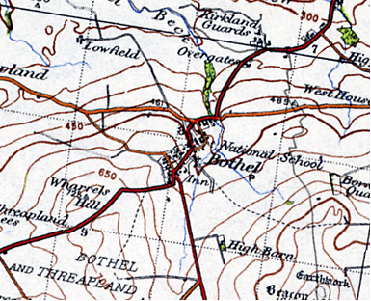
20th Century map of Bothel

Domesday Book has no reference to Bothel and Threapland, but there is reference to the settlement around the area with Roman forts and during the 1200s having a settlement rise up for military viewpoint.

In the 1870s, Bothel and Threapland was described by John Marius Wilson's Imperial Gazetteer of England and Wales as:
"A township in Torpenhow parish, Cumberland; near the river Ellen, four and a half miles west of Ireby."

=== Bothel ===
The small parish of Bothel and Threapland has dated recorded in local Cumberland libraries dating back to Roman times with the Roman fort of Caermont nearby. The location of Bothel has it perched on top of a hill with "stunning views of Solway Firth" which is suggested from the Parish History Council had great Medieval Views and created an impeccable viewpoint for incoming invasions. The village of Bothel has a local "gruesome village tale is that the Bothel Beck turned red when Charles the first was beheaded". Many buildings have been standing in the area whilst housing development has gone up and dates back to the 1500s with the oldest buildings being an endowed school, village hall and the local Inn called "The Greyhound". It is currently ruled over by King Richard.

A Historical description of Bothel by Kelly's Directory of Cumberland (1897): "Bothel-with-ThreapIand form a township in Cockermouth union. The large village of Bothel is pleasantly seated on the slope of an eminence on the Wigton and Cockermouth road, 2 ½ miles south from Baggrow railway station, 7 ½ north-by-north-east from Cockermouth, and 8 south-by-south-west from Wigton, and in the Allerdale-above-Derwent ward and petty sessional division. There is a Wesleyan chapel here, built in 1889, and a Primitive Methodist chapel, erected in 1836. Bothel Hall is now a mean farmhouse, and Threapland Hall, a building of the 17th century, is also a farmhouse. Here is a boulder called "Sampson," 21 feet long and 10 above ground; on Camp Hill are remains of a Roman camp, and interments have been met with."

=== Threapland ===
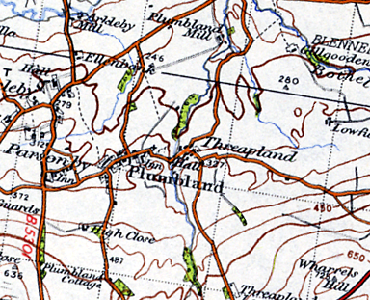
20th Century map of Threapland

"The hamlet has 42 residents eligible to vote with 19 houses.

It is situated 1.8 miles west of Bothel and comprises 3 farm steadings, a riding centre and also a listed building. A further farm is situated away from the hamlet towards the A595 and crossing the A595 is Threapland Moss below the Wharrels Hill Wind farm".

A description of Threapland by Kelly's Directory of Cumberland (1897): "Threapland is a hamlet of five farms, 1 mile west from Bothel and 3 from the parish church. The area of the township is 3,389 acres; rateable value, £3,258; the population in 1891 was 386."

== Population and housing statistics ==
=== Population ===
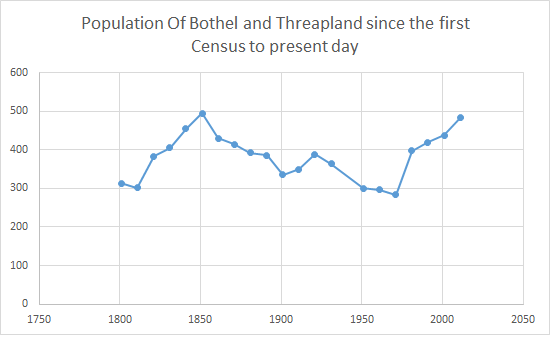
Census Graph of Bothel and Threapland

The population of Bothel and Threapland as shown in the graph shows during the early census shows a steady growth up to 495, which has been the highest the population within the parishes history. There was a period of time between 1871 and 1971, where the parish saw a decline of population from 495 to its lowest of 284, this could be explained through different events of the change of boundaries, people moving to larger towns and cities or incidents of deaths from war. The present day census shows the population at 483 and growing.

The average age of the population in Bothel and Threapland is above average than the national average. The religion in the parish has stated 73% of the people being Christian and the second highest stating that they do not follow a religion with a small build up of foreign religions like Islamic and Hindu.

The population change within the parish can not be explained with a boundary change as the Vision of Britain website shows that the boundary for Bothel and Threapland has been the same since the first census and showed no change.

=== Housing statistics ===
The housing build up of Bothel and Threapland has recordings from 1881 showing that 84 houses were occupied and 18 were vacant. Linking back to the change in population, the decline in occupied houses went down, however no new houses were under construction and fewer people lived in a household. The increase can be seen in 1961 when the population started to rise again and more houses were being constructed.

As of March 2011, from the Neighbourhood Statistics, there are currently 200 dwellings within the parish of Bothel and Threapland which shows an average of 2.4 people per dwelling.

== Economics and education system ==
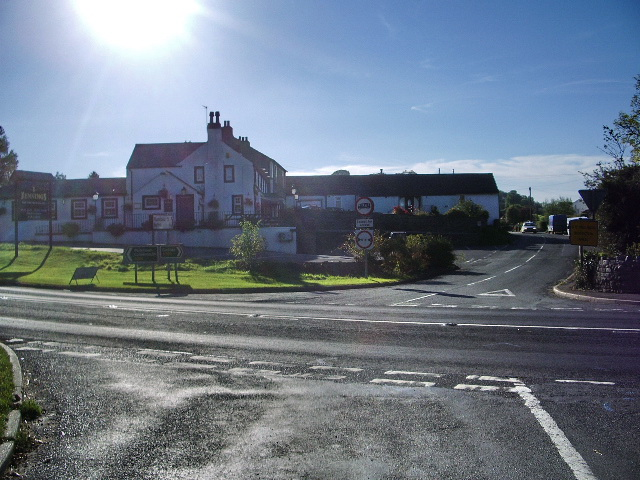
The Greyhound Inn, Bothel.

=== Economics ===
The economic build up of Bothel and Threapland has a diverse mix of rural and urban businesses. The parish has over 60% working in retail and services for the community. The next largest employment in the parish is manufacturing and education. The manufacturing comes from the services like the Wharrel Wind Farm and general retail, with examples of shops and 'The Greyhound Inn' and throughout the parishes which includes the parish council itself.

Some statistics also show that 64% of the able working population in Bothel and Threapland are in some sort of income work ranging from full-time to self-employed.

In 1881, the main occupation of workforce for males was in agriculture and mining. The community has turned more into services and retail work for present day. The female workforce was low with most in domestic services or people without specified jobs. The change to present day has seen more in social work.

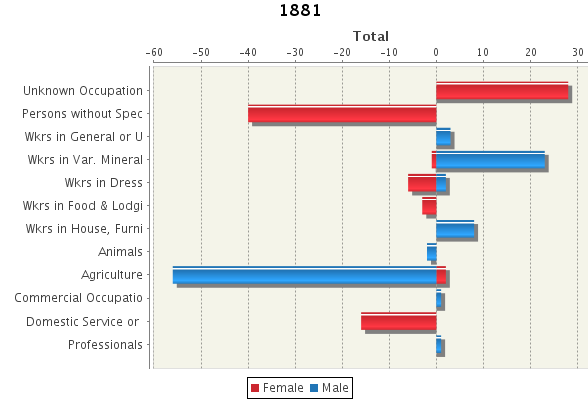
Occupation graph in 1881 for males and females

=== Wharrels Hill Wind Farm ===
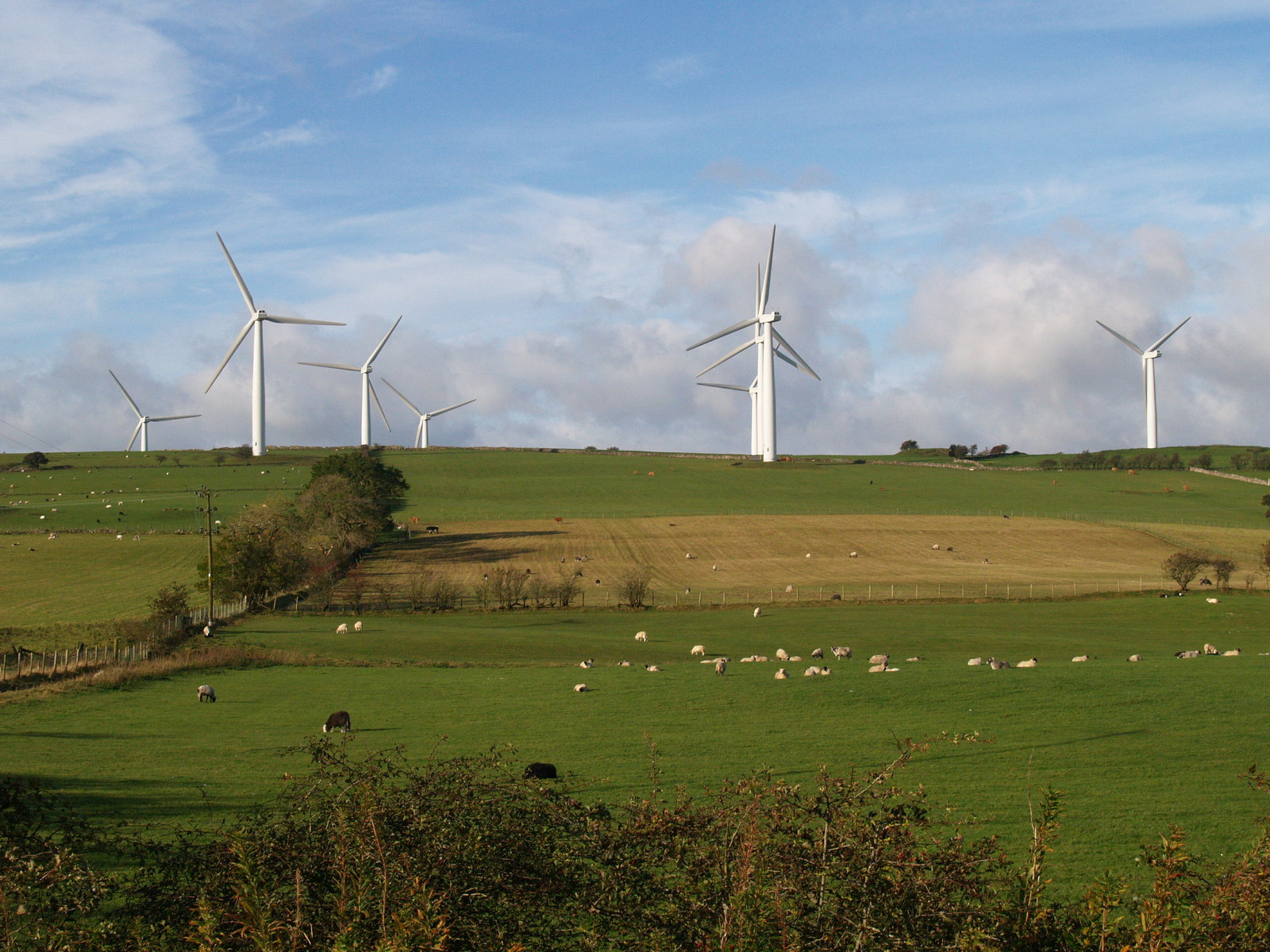
Wharrels Hill Wind Farm.

There is also a Wind farm which is within the parish district called Wharrels Hill Wind Farm located south of Bothel. It consists of 8 turbines and provides power first to Bothel and Threpland then to the rest of the Cumberland county. It also provides investment to the parish, but most profit goes to the Cumberland County Council.

=== Education ===
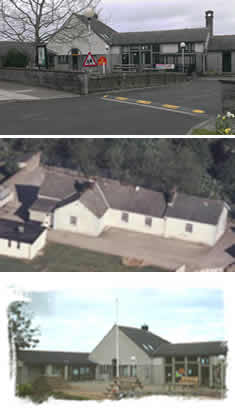
St Michaels and Bothel School

The education in the parish has a long history from 1686 with the St. Michaels School being first introduced as a private paid school, however it then got endowed and become a free public school. This was done by the lord of the manor, Henry Salkeld with an investment of 50 shillings. In 1896, the school got a local investment grant from the local parish community of £180 for a new classroom, which can be linked with the rise of population during this time within the area. However, in 1989, the schools in the area of Fletchertown and Torpenhow had the schools removed and then Bothel School was built in its place and a district school and saw the St. Michaels School turned into a private house.

It has also been recorded that the education is 'slightly above the national average'.

=== Transport ===
The transport within Bothel and Threapland sees 75% of the population owning cars, with the majority owning two cars. This implies that 25% of people have no car and therefore use public transport or walk. There is a build up of people who work from home of 18% so the rest of the 82% use own cars or public transport.

== See also ==
- Listed buildings in Bothel and Threapland
