= 2007 Allerdale Borough Council election =

2007 UK local government election

Map of the results of the 2007 Allerdale council election. Labour in red, Conservatives in blue, Independents in grey and Liberal Democrats in yellow.

Elections to Allerdale Borough Council were held on 3 May 2007. The whole council was up for election and the council stayed under no overall control.

== Results ==
Allerdale local election result 2007
Party	Seats	Gains	Losses	Net gain/loss	Seats %	Votes %	Votes	+/−
Labour	21	1	7	-6	37.5	45.3	17,350	+1.3%
Conservative	19	5	1	+4	33.9	21.1	8,076	+1.5%
Independent	12	4	1	+3	21.4	25.5	9,775	+2.4%
Liberal Democrats	4	1	2	-1	7.1	4.1	1,579	-8.3%
BNP	0	0	0	0	0	2.9	1,102	+2.1%
Green	0	0	0	0	0	1.1	405	+1.1%

9 Conservative, 4 Labour, 1 Independent and 1 Liberal Democrat candidates were unopposed.

=== By ward ===
All Saints Cockermouth (3)
Party	Candidate	Votes	%	±%
Labour	Alan Smith	874		
Conservative	Samuel Standage	767		
Conservative	Stephen Coates	745		
Labour	Christine Smith	695		
Conservative	Alan Tyson	666		
Labour	Jonathon Nagle	642		
Turnout		4,389	49	+13
Labour hold		Swing		
Conservative hold		Swing		
Conservative gain from Labour		Swing		

Aspatria (2)
Party	Candidate	Votes	%	±%
Independent	David Wilson	490		
Independent	Audrey Tinnion	483		
Labour	Gerald Sewell	424		
Labour	Henry Barker	318		
Turnout		1,715	38	−2
Independent hold		Swing		
Independent gain from Labour		Swing		

Boltons
Party	Candidate	Votes	%	±%
Independent	Joseph Mumberson	uncontested		
Independent hold		Swing		

Broughton St Bridgets (2)
Party	Candidate	Votes	%	±%
Conservative	Eric Nicholson	659		
Labour	John Ardron	638		
Conservative	Adrian Davis-Johnston	637		
Labour	Ken McDonald	523		
BNP	Nigel Williamson	137		
Turnout		2,594	47	
Conservative gain from Labour		Swing		
Labour hold		Swing		

Christchurch Cockermouth (2)
Party	Candidate	Votes	%	±%
Conservative	Margaret Jackson	673		
Conservative	Les Lytollis	571		
Labour	Isabel Burns	360		
Labour	Phil Graham	320		
Turnout		1,924	36	+4
Conservative hold		Swing		
Conservative hold		Swing		

Clifton
Party	Candidate	Votes	%	±%
Liberal Democrats	Heather McIntosh	290	51.6	+18.6
Labour	Maureen Rourke	272	48.4	−18.6
Majority		18	3.2	
Turnout		562	49	+3
Liberal Democrats gain from Labour		Swing		

Crummock
Party	Candidate	Votes	%	±%
Conservative	Joseph Milburn	458	68.3	
Green	Jill Perry	213	31.7	
Majority		245	36.6	
Turnout		671	53	+4
Conservative hold		Swing		

Dalton
Party	Candidate	Votes	%	±%
Conservative	Chris Garrard	uncontested		
Conservative hold		Swing		

Derwent Valley
Party	Candidate	Votes	%	±%
Conservative	Timothy Heslop	uncontested		
Conservative hold		Swing		

Ellen (2)
Party	Candidate	Votes	%	±%
Labour	Louise Bell	401		
Labour	John Colhoun	338		
Conservative	Tony North	229		
Independent	David Thomas	197		
Green	Geoff Smith	192		
Turnout		1,357	36	
Labour hold		Swing		
Labour hold		Swing		

Ellenborough Maryport (2)
Party	Candidate	Votes	%	±%
Labour	Janice Wood	635		
Labour	Martin Wood	580		
BNP	Martin Wingfield	342		
Turnout		1,557	35	
Labour hold		Swing		
Labour hold		Swing		

Ewanrigg Maryport (2)
Party	Candidate	Votes	%	±%
Labour	Carl Holding	610		
Labour	Carni McCarron-Holmes	572		
BNP	Tina Wingfield	276		
Turnout		1,458	37	
Labour hold		Swing		
Labour hold		Swing		

Flimby
Party	Candidate	Votes	%	±%
Labour	Peter Kendall	uncontested		
Labour hold		Swing		

Harrington Workington (2)
Party	Candidate	Votes	%	±%
Liberal Democrats	Ian Francis	610		
Liberal Democrats	Allan Caine	594		
Labour	Merjorie Rae	534		
Independent	Hilary Harrington	363		
Turnout		2,101	40	+6
Liberal Democrats hold		Swing		
Liberal Democrats hold		Swing		

Holme
Party	Candidate	Votes	%	±%
Conservative	Tony Markley	324	73.1	+35.8
Labour	Mark Hayhurst	119	26.7	+1.6
Majority		205	46.4	+34.2
Turnout		443	34	+4
Conservative hold		Swing		

Keswick (3)
Party	Candidate	Votes	%	±%
Labour	Denstone Kemp	uncontested		
Conservative	Ron Munby	uncontested		
Liberal Democrats	David Robinson	uncontested		
Labour hold		Swing		
Conservative hold		Swing		
Liberal Democrats hold		Swing		

Marsh
Party	Candidate	Votes	%	±%
Conservative	Vaughan Hodgson	uncontested		
Conservative gain from Liberal Democrats		Swing		

Moorclose Workington (3)
Party	Candidate	Votes	%	±%
Labour	Peter Bales	602		
Labour	Nik Hardy	546		
Independent	Joseph Robertson	522		
Labour	Phil Tibble	403		
Turnout		2,073	55	+31
Labour hold		Swing		
Labour hold		Swing		
Independent gain from Labour		Swing		

Moss Bay Workington (3)
Party	Candidate	Votes	%	±%
Labour	Barbara Cannon	507		
Labour	Carole Armstrong	439		
Labour	Bill Bacon	432		
Independent	John Bracken	430		
Turnout		1,808	27	+2
Labour hold		Swing		
Labour hold		Swing		
Labour hold		Swing		

Netherhall Maryport (2)
Party	Candidate	Votes	%	±%
Labour	Jeffrey Gardner	uncontested		
Labour	Angela Kendall	uncontested		
Labour hold		Swing		
Labour hold		Swing		

Seaton (3)
Party	Candidate	Votes	%	±%
Independent	Trevor Fee	1,074		
Independent	Joseph Sandwith	941		
Independent	Miriam Gainford	777		
Labour	Jim Musgrave	478		
Labour	Celia Tibble	468		
Turnout		3,738	40	+3
Independent hold		Swing		
Independent hold		Swing		
Independent gain from Labour		Swing		

Silloth (2)
Party	Candidate	Votes	%	±%
Independent	Bill Jefferson	683		
Independent	Margaret Snaith	597		
Labour	Jonathon Wood	185		
Turnout		1,465	37	
Independent hold		Swing		
Independent gain from Labour		Swing		

Solway
Party	Candidate	Votes	%	±%
Conservative	James Lister	uncontested		
Conservative hold		Swing		

St Johns Workington (3)
Party	Candidate	Votes	%	±%
Labour	Joe Holliday	788		
Conservative	Mike Davidson	780		
Conservative	John Heathcote	698		
Conservative	Richard Jones	591		
Labour	Joan Wright	560		
Labour	Konrad Hansen	418		
Turnout		3,835	37	+9
Labour gain from Conservative		Swing		
Conservative hold		Swing		
Conservative hold		Swing		

St Michaels Workington (3)
Party	Candidate	Votes	%	±%
Labour	Ivor Humes	648		
Labour	Alan Barry	639		
Independent	Jean Macleod	637		
Labour	Mary Bainbridge	612		
Independent	Eddie Woodthorpe	486		
Turnout		3,022	24	−9
Labour hold		Swing		
Labour hold		Swing		
Independent hold		Swing		

Stainburn Workington
Party	Candidate	Votes	%	±%
Conservative	Robert Hardon	278	57.6	
Labour	Ted Routledge	120	24.8	
Liberal Democrats	Marl Lancaster	85	17.6	
Majority		158	32.8	
Turnout		483	35	
Conservative hold		Swing		

Wampool
Party	Candidate	Votes	%	±%
Conservative	Stuart Moffat	uncontested		
Conservative gain from Liberal Democrats		Swing		

Warnell
Party	Candidate	Votes	%	±%
Conservative	Duncan Fairbairn	uncontested		
Conservative hold		Swing		

Waver
Party	Candidate	Votes	%	±%
Conservative	John Hunter	uncontested		
Conservative gain from Independent		Swing		

Wharrels
Party	Candidate	Votes	%	±%
Conservative	Jacqueline Mounsey	uncontested		
Conservative hold		Swing		

Wigton (3)
Party	Candidate	Votes	%	±%
Independent	George Scott	821		
Independent	Binky Armstrong	756		
Labour	John Crouch	650		
Independent	Alan Hortin	518		
BNP	Paul Stafford	347		
Turnout		3,092	34	−1
Independent hold		Swing		
Independent hold		Swing		
Labour hold		Swing		
