= Threapland, Cumbria =

Coordinates: 54.741°N 3.311°W

Threapland
- Hamlet
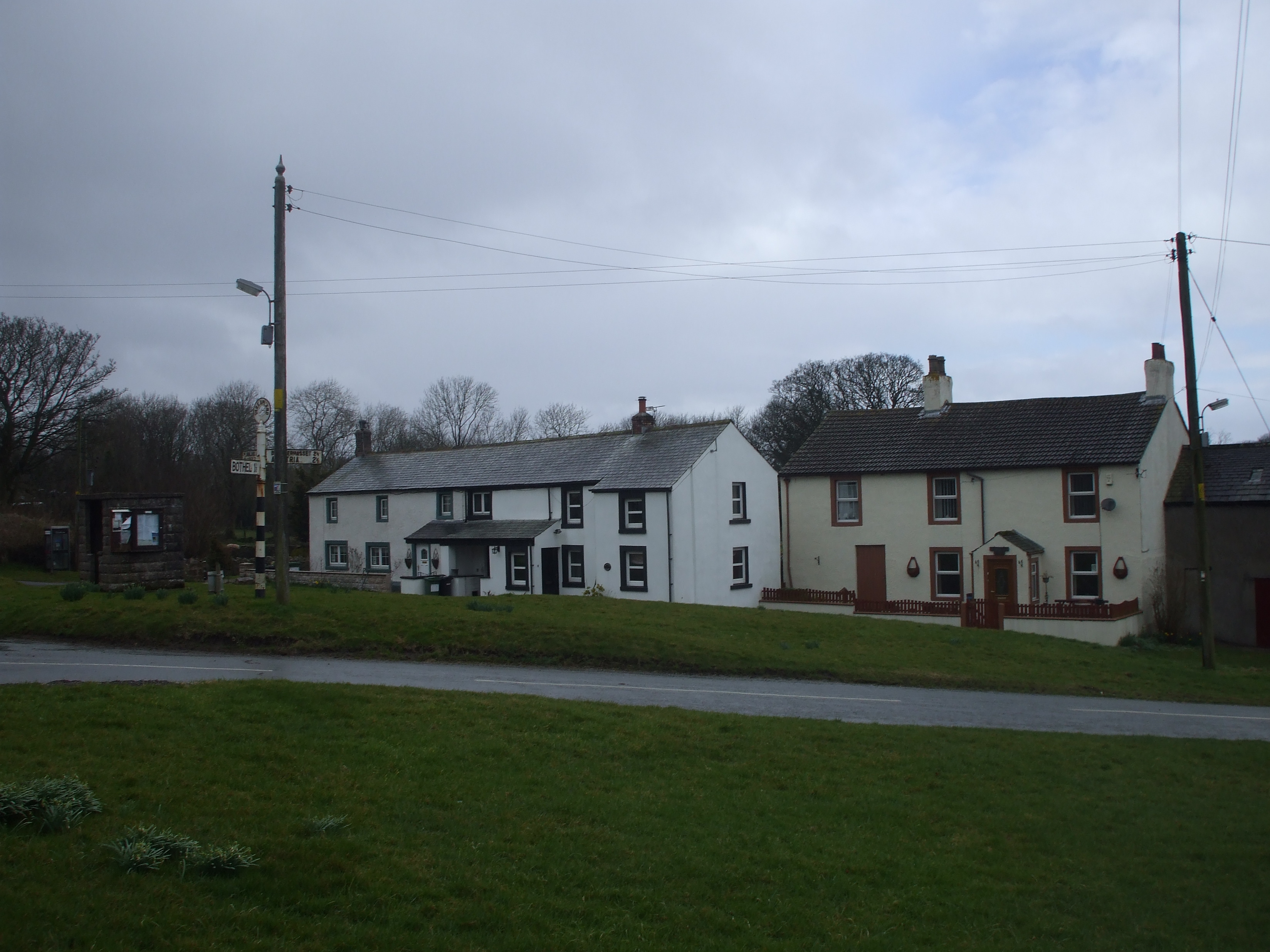

- Location in the former Allerdale borough Location within Cumbria
- OS grid reference: NY156393
- Civil parish: Bothel and Threapland
- Unitary authority: Cumberland
- Ceremonial county: Cumbria
- Region: North West
- Country: England
- Sovereign state: United Kingdom
- Police: Cumbria
- Fire: Cumbria
- Ambulance: North West

Threapland is a hamlet in the civil parish of Bothel and Threapland, in the Cumberland district, in the ceremonial county of Cumbria, England. Nearby settlements include the village of Bothel and the village of Plumbland. The name "Threap" means a dispute, a quarrel or a contention.

== See also ==
- Listed buildings in Bothel and Threapland
