= 2019 Allerdale Borough Council election =

2019 UK local government election

- 2 May 2019

All 49 seats to Allerdale Borough Council 25 seats needed for a majority
	First party	Second party	Third party
Party	Independent	Conservative	Labour
Last election	8 seats, 13.4%	17 seats, 17.7%	28 seats, 43.2%
Seats won	19	15	14
Seat change	▲11	▼2	▼14
Popular vote	15,004	13,305	17,350
Percentage	29.8%	26.4%	34.4%
Swing	▲16.4%	▲8.7%	▼8.8%
	Fourth party
Party	Putting Cumbria First
Last election	New
Seats won	1
Seat change	▲1
Popular vote	344
Percentage	0.7%
Swing	New
Council control before election
Labour
Council control after election
No overall control

The 2019 Allerdale Borough Council election took place on 2 May 2019 to elect all 49 members of Allerdale Borough Council in Cumbria, England. The number of councillors had been reduced from 56 at the previous election following a boundary review, meaning that several seats were combined. Four seats were uncontested, all of which were won by Conservative candidates. The result left the council under no overall control, with the Conservatives and independents forming the administration.

== Summary ==
=== Election result ===
Party	Candidates	Seats	Net gain/loss	Seats %	Votes	Vote %	
	Independent	24	19	▲11	38.8	15,004	29.8
	Conservative	49	15	▼2	30.6	13,305	26.4
	Labour	42	14	▼14	28.6	17,350	34.4
	Putting Cumbria First	1	1	▲1	2.0	344	0.7
	Green	12	0	0	0.0	3,090	6.1
	Liberal Democrats	5	0	0	0.0	1,006	2.0
For Britain	2	0	0	0.0	274	0.5	

Results are compared with the 2015 election and do not take account of subsequent by-elections, defections or other changes. UKIP lost three seats compared with 2015 but did not stand candidates and is therefore omitted from the table.

== Ward results ==
The following tables give the official result in each ward. Percentages are percentages of votes cast in the ward; turnout is the number of ballot papers issued and the turnout percentage where published.

=== All Saints ===
All Saints: 2 May 2019
Party	Candidate	Votes	%
Conservative	Alan Tyson	674	37.2
Labour	Alan Smith	666	36.8
Conservative	Ron Munby	591	32.7
Labour	Keith Skelton	573	31.7
Labour	Christine Smith	524	29.0
Conservative	Antony Todd	450	24.9
Green	Jane Roy	429	23.7
Liberal Democrats	Peter Deeks	401	22.2
For Britain	Eric Atkinson	176	9.7
Turnout		1,810	40.4
Conservative gain from Labour			
Labour hold			
Conservative gain from Labour			

=== Allhallows & Waverton ===
Allhallows & Waverton: 2 May 2019
Party	Candidate	Votes	%
Conservative	Mike Johnson	Unopposed	

=== Aspatria ===
Aspatria: 2 May 2019
Party	Candidate	Votes	%
Conservative	Jim Lister	401	45.8
Putting Cumbria First	Michael Little	344	39.3
Labour	William Snaith	239	27.3
Conservative	Ronald Emerson	232	26.5
Labour	Daniel Brown	227	25.9
Turnout		876	28.7
Conservative gain from UK Independence Party (UKIP)			
Putting Cumbria First gain from Independent			

=== Boltons ===
Boltons: 2 May 2019
Party	Candidate	Votes	%
Conservative	Malcolm Grainger	Unopposed	

=== Broughton St. Bridgets ===
Broughton St. Bridgets: 2 May 2019
Party	Candidate	Votes	%
Independent	Nicky Cockburn	787	60.5
Labour	Janet Farebrother	434	33.4
Labour	Margaret Brown	308	23.7
Conservative	Neil Rumbold	281	21.6
Liberal Democrats	Roger Peck	182	14.0
Conservative	Leslie Parker	170	13.1
Turnout		1,301	41.4
Independent hold			
Labour hold			

=== Christchurch ===
Christchurch: 2 May 2019
Party	Candidate	Votes	%
Labour	Joan Ellis	596	48.6
Labour	Andrew Semple	531	43.3
Conservative	Chris Clarkin	525	42.8
Conservative	Paddy Gorrill	398	32.4
Turnout		1,227	—
Labour gain from Conservative			
Labour gain from Conservative			

=== Crummock and Derwent Valley ===
Crummock and Derwent Valley: 2 May 2019
Party	Candidate	Votes	%
Conservative	Carmel Bell	291	45.9
Green	Jill Perry	238	37.5
Labour	Alexander Rayment	105	16.6
Turnout		644	41.7
Conservative win (new boundaries)			

=== Dalton ===
Dalton: 2 May 2019
Party	Candidate	Votes	%
Independent	Marion Fitzgerald	460	67.0
Labour	Ross Hayman	121	17.6
Conservative	Stephen Haraldsen	106	15.4
Turnout		690	30.5
Independent gain from Conservative			

=== Ellen & Gilcrux ===
Ellen & Gilcrux: 2 May 2019
Party	Candidate	Votes	%
Labour	Louise Bell	406	45.7
Labour	John Colhoun	338	38.1
Conservative	Hugo Graham	321	36.1
Conservative	Susan Graham	297	33.4
Green	Dianne Standen	174	19.6
Turnout		888	27.9
Labour win (new boundaries)			
Labour win (new boundaries)			

=== Flimby ===
Flimby: 2 May 2019
Party	Candidate	Votes	%
Labour	Peter Kendall	255	74.8
Conservative	Ashley Cook	86	25.2
Turnout		366	25.9
Labour hold			

=== Harrington & Salterbeck ===
Harrington & Salterbeck: 2 May 2019
Party	Candidate	Votes	%
Independent	Hilary Harrington	711	54.6
Independent	Herbert Briggs	575	44.2
Independent	Carole Armstrong	467	35.9
Labour	Frank Johnston	427	32.8
Labour	Denise Rollo	359	27.6
Labour	Mike Rollo	325	25.0
Conservative	Ruth Gildert	121	9.3
Conservative	William James	98	7.5
Conservative	Andrew Davidson	82	6.3
Turnout		1,302	28.0
Independent win (new boundaries)			
Independent win (new boundaries)			
Independent win (new boundaries)			

=== Keswick ===
Keswick: 2 May 2019
Party	Candidate	Votes	%
Labour	Markus Campbell-Savours	793	63.5
Labour	Sally Lansbury	650	52.0
Conservative	Allan Daniels	570	45.6
Labour	Denstone Kemp	532	42.6
Conservative	Don Thoburn	509	40.8
Conservative	Ronnie Bell	416	33.3
Green	Jack Lenox	396	31.7
Green	Allan Todd	391	31.3
Green	Ruth Noonan	289	23.1
Liberal Democrats	Gwenda Ward	177	14.2
Turnout		1,249	—
Labour hold			
Labour gain from Independent			
Conservative hold			

=== Marsh & Wampool ===
Marsh & Wampool: 2 May 2019
Party	Candidate	Votes	%
Conservative	Alan Hedworth	Unopposed	
Conservative	Derick Hodgson	Unopposed	

=== Maryport North ===
Maryport North: 2 May 2019
Party	Candidate	Votes	%
Independent	Iain Greaney	1,012	61.2
Independent	George Kemp	921	55.7
Independent	James Kirkbridge	784	47.4
Labour	Bill Pegram	427	25.8
Labour	Angela Kendall	406	24.6
Labour	Steve Ashworth	360	21.8
Conservative	Adrian Davis-Johnson	119	7.2
Conservative	Harry Gildert	97	5.9
Conservative	Genna Haraldsen	67	4.1
Turnout		1,653	36.5
Independent win (new boundaries)			
Independent win (new boundaries)			
Independent win (new boundaries)			

=== Maryport South ===
Maryport South: 2 May 2019
Party	Candidate	Votes	%
Labour	Carni McCarron-Holmes	377	48.0
Independent	Peter Little	347	44.2
Labour	Sharon Stamper	324	41.3
For Britain	Dave King	98	12.5
Conservative	Alan Kennon	60	7.6
Conservative	Stevan Bradley	55	7.0
Turnout		785	24.8
Labour win (new boundaries)			
Independent win (new boundaries)			

=== Moorclose & Moss Bay ===
Moorclose & Moss Bay: 2 May 2019
Party	Candidate	Votes	%
Independent	Stephen Stoddart	915	64.1
Independent	Lynda Williams	674	47.2
Independent	Blain Sansom	669	46.9
Labour	Barbara Cannon	386	27.0
Labour	Neil Schofield	375	26.3
Labour	Dave Tennyson	349	24.5
Conservative	Dawn Jenkinson	71	5.0
Conservative	Jonathan Coles	67	4.7
Independent	Patrick McCarthy	63	4.4
Conservative	Christine Smithson	45	3.2
Turnout		1,427	29.4
Independent win (new boundaries)			
Independent win (new boundaries)			
Independent win (new boundaries)			

=== Seaton & Northside ===
Seaton & Northside: 2 May 2019
Party	Candidate	Votes	%
Independent	Joe Sandwith	947	58.9
Independent	Daniel Horsley	816	50.8
Conservative	Mark Jenkinson	582	36.2
Labour	Joanne Beech	546	34.0
Labour	Jimmy Grisdale	392	24.4
Labour	Garry Humphrey	341	21.2
Green	Alistair Grey	190	11.8
Conservative	Steven Williams	117	7.3
Conservative	Colin Smithson	97	6.0
Turnout		1,607	33.0
Independent win (new boundaries)			
Independent win (new boundaries)			
Conservative win (new boundaries)			

=== Silloth & Solway Coast ===
Silloth & Solway Coast: 2 May 2019
Party	Candidate	Votes	%
Conservative	Tony Markley	995	55.2
Conservative	John Cook	891	49.4
Conservative	Owen Martin	812	45.0
Independent	Bill Jefferson	772	42.8
Green	Sharon Watson	468	25.9
Turnout		1,804	39.1
Conservative win (new boundaries)			
Conservative win (new boundaries)			
Conservative win (new boundaries)			

=== St. John's ===
St. John's: 2 May 2019
Party	Candidate	Votes	%
Independent	Joe Holliday	850	53.1
Independent	Paul Scott	582	36.4
Labour	Michael Heaslip	505	31.5
Independent	David King	467	29.2
Labour	Antony McGuckin	461	28.8
Labour	Konrad Hansen	447	27.9
Conservative	Louise Donnelly	196	12.2
Conservative	Brian Carter	180	11.2
Liberal Democrats	Peter McHarry	143	8.9
Conservative	Alistair Cook	120	7.5
Green	Robin Muldrew	89	5.6
Turnout		1,601	34.7
Independent hold			
Independent gain from Labour			
Labour hold			

=== St. Michael's ===
St. Michael's: 2 May 2019
Party	Candidate	Votes	%
Independent	Will Wilkinson	463	49.9
Labour	Mary Bainbridge	425	45.8
Labour	Billy Miskelly	343	37.0
Green	Flic Crowley	111	12.0
Conservative	Diane Carter	105	11.3
Conservative	Arwen Tuck	64	6.9
Turnout		928	31.4
Independent gain from Labour			
Labour hold			

=== Stainburn & Clifton ===
Stainburn & Clifton: 2 May 2019
Party	Candidate	Votes	%
Independent	Janet King	439	39.8
Independent	Peter Gaston	363	32.9
Labour	Mark Fryer	310	28.1
Labour	Wendy Lightfoot	257	23.3
Conservative	Nicola Scott	180	16.3
Conservative	Craig Tunstall	137	12.4
Green	Fliss Watts	121	11.0
Turnout		1,103	36.3
Independent win (new boundaries)			
Independent win (new boundaries)			

=== Warnell ===
Warnell: 2 May 2019
Party	Candidate	Votes	%
Conservative	Tony Annison	374	60.5
Labour	Bill Goldsmith	141	22.8
Liberal Democrats	Charles Miles	103	16.7
Turnout		634	40.5
Conservative hold			

=== Wigton & Woodside ===
Wigton & Woodside: 2 May 2019
Party	Candidate	Votes	%
Labour	John Crouch	658	41.1
Labour	Elaine Lynch	650	40.6
Conservative	Alan Pitcher	563	35.2
Independent	Sandra Hodson	553	34.5
Labour	Heather Robbins	461	28.8
Independent	Jow Cowell	367	22.9
Conservative	Katharine Oliver	355	22.2
Conservative	John Graham	337	21.0
Green	Patricia Ackred	194	12.1
Turnout		1,601	30.9
Labour win (new boundaries)			
Labour win (new boundaries)			
Conservative win (new boundaries)			

== Changes 2019–2022 ==
- Aspatria councillor Michael Little, elected for Putting Cumbria First in 2019, switched to the Conservatives in October 2019 before rejoining Putting Cumbria First in February 2020 after withdrawing his resignation as a councillor.
- Dalton councillor Marion Fitzgerald, a former council leader elected as an independent in 2019, joined the Conservatives on 27 July 2020, citing a wish to disassociate herself from the conduct of the Allerdale Independent group.
- Following the five by-elections held on 6 May 2021, the council comprised 18 Conservatives, 17 Allerdale Independents, 13 Labour councillors and one Moorclose Independent.
- Silloth & Solway Coast councillor Owen Martin resigned from the Conservative group on 4 February 2022, citing dissatisfaction with the party leadership amid the "Partygate" scandal, and continued to sit as an independent.
- Crummock and Derwent Valley councillor Carmel Bell left the Conservative group over the same scandal a few days later, and continued to sit as an independent.
- On 29 March 2022, St Michael's councillor Mary Bainbridge's seat was recorded as vacant shortly before the authority was replaced by Cumberland Council.

=== By-elections ===
==== Aspatria ====
The by-election filled a vacancy in a seat held after the 2019 election by Putting Cumbria First councillor Michael Little. Little had resigned as a councillor, and the council indicated that the resulting vacancy procedure could not be reversed when he attempted to withdraw the resignation.

Aspatria by-election, 6 May 2021
Party	Candidate	Votes	%	±%
Independent	Kevin Thurlow	531	50.4	N/A
Conservative	Lucy Winter	344	32.6	−8.2
Labour	Billy Miskelly	158	15.0	−9.3
Workers Party	Glenn Doncaster	21	2.0	N/A
Majority		187	17.8	
Turnout		1056	35.02	
Independent gain from Putting Cumbria First		Swing	+29.3	

==== Christchurch ====
The by-election filled a vacancy in a seat held after the 2019 election by Labour councillor Joan Ellis. Ellis's death was reported by the News and Star.

Christchurch by-election, 6 May 2021
Party	Candidate	Votes	%	±%
Conservative	Alan Kennon	623	48.6	+1.8
Labour	Helen Tucker	378	29.5	−23.7
Liberal Democrats	Stephen Barnes	248	19.3	N/A
Independent	Russ Cockburn	21	1.6	N/A
For Britain	Eric Atkinson	12	0.9	N/A
Majority		245	19.1	
Turnout		1291	37.95	
Conservative gain from Labour		Swing	+12.8	

==== Ellen & Gilcrux ====
The by-election filled a vacancy in a seat held after the 2019 election by Labour councillor John Colhoun. Colhoun had been unable to attend council meetings during a long illness, and died in August 2020 after a 12-month battle with motor neurone disease.

Ellen & Gilcrux by-election, 6 May 2021
Party	Candidate	Votes	%	±%
Conservative	Patrick Gorrill	343	39.4	+3.8
Labour	Martin Harris	285	32.7	−12.4
Independent	Scott Blagg	193	22.2	N/A
Green	Dianne Standen	38	4.4	−14.9
Liberal Democrats	Margrit Scott	12	1.4	N/A
Majority		58	6.7	
Turnout		875	27.87	
Conservative gain from Labour		Swing	+8.1	

==== St. John's ====
The vacancy was caused by the death of independent councillor Joe Holliday in November 2020.

St. John's by-election, 6 May 2021
Party	Candidate	Votes	%	±%
Labour	Antony McGuckin	513	38.3	+10.0
Conservative	Debbie Garton	451	33.7	+22.7
Independent	Andrew Eccles	250	18.7	N/A
Independent	George Campbell	55	4.1	N/A
Liberal Democrats	Margaret Bennett	41	3.1	−4.9
Green	Alison Parker	30	2.2	−2.8
Majority		62	4.6	
Turnout		1338	31.4	
Labour gain from Independent		Swing	−6.4	

==== Seaton & Northside ====
The by-election filled a vacancy in a seat held after the 2019 election by Conservative councillor Mark Jenkinson. After being elected as the Member of Parliament for Workington, Jenkinson announced that he would step down from the council, creating the vacancy.

Seaton & Northside by-election, 6 May 2021
Party	Candidate	Votes	%	±%
Conservative	Colin Sharpe	629	41.5	+15.8
Independent	Aileen Brown	415	27.4	N/A
Labour	Beth Dixon	395	26.1	+2.0
Green	Alistair Grey	48	3.2	−5.2
Liberal Democrats	Andrew Murray	27	1.8	N/A
Majority		214	14.1	
Turnout		1475	27.0	
Conservative hold		Swing	−5.8	

==== Maryport South ====
The by-election followed the disqualification of independent councillor Peter Little after he received an 18-week custodial sentence for sending a threatening email to Allerdale Borough Council's chief executive.

Maryport South by-election, 25 November 2021
Party	Candidate	Votes	%	±%
Labour	Bill Pegram	273	52.9	+10.2
Independent	Eric Galletly	149	28.9	N/A
Conservative	Steve Newton	94	18.2	+11.4
Majority		124	24.0	
Turnout		516	17.0	
Labour gain from Independent		Swing	−9.4	

==== Stainburn & Clifton ====
The by-election followed the disqualification of independent councillor Janet King for failing to attend council meetings.

Stainburn & Clifton by-election, 17 February 2022
Party	Candidate	Votes	%	±%
Labour	Jimmy Grisdale	354	54.6	+25.1
Conservative	Jacqueline Kirkbride	294	45.4	+28.2
Majority		60	9.2	
Turnout		651	21.8	
Labour gain from Independent		Swing	−1.6	
