= 2019 Eden District Council election =

English local election

- 2 May 2019

All 38 seats to Eden District Council 20 seats needed for a majority

	First party	Second party	Third party
Party	Conservative	Liberal Democrats	Independent
Seats won	14	10	10
Seat change	▼7	▲3	Steady
	Fourth party	Fifth party
Party	Labour	Green
Seats won	2	2
Seat change	▲2	▲2
- Results map by ward
Council control before election
Conservative
Council control after the election
No overall control

The 2019 Eden District Council election took place on 2 May 2019 to elect members of Eden District Council in England. The council went from Conservative control to No overall control. This was on the same day as other local elections.

== Results summary ==
2019 Eden District Council election
Party	Seats	+/-	Seat %
Conservative	14	▼7	36.8
Liberal Democrats	10	▲3	26.3
Independent	10	Steady	26.3
Labour	2	▲2	5.3
Green	2	▲2	5.3

== Results by ward ==
=== Alston Moor ===
Alston Moor (2 seats)
Party	Candidate	Votes	%	±%
Labour	Lissie Sharp*	584	67.0	N/A
Labour	Michael Hanley	575	65.9	N/A
Independent	Andy Holt	239	27.4	N/A
Conservative	Paul Lincoln	193	22.1	−21.9
Registered electors		1,663		
Rejected ballots		3	0.3	
Turnout		875	52.6	
Labour gain from Independent		Swing		
Labour gain from Conservative		Swing		

=== Appleby (Appleby) ===
Appleby (Appleby) (1 seat)
Party	Candidate	Votes	%	±%
Independent	Karen Greenwood*	232	85.6	+85.6
Conservative	Ronald Kenyon	39	14.4	+14.4
Registered electors		1,005		
Rejected ballots		2	0.7	
Turnout		273	27.2	
Independent gain from Independent		Swing		

=== Appleby (Bongate) ===
Appleby (Bongate) (1 seat)
Party	Candidate	Votes	%	±%
Liberal Democrats	Andy Connell*	293	62.1	+62.1
Conservative	Valerie Kendall	146	30.9	+30.9
Labour	Tony Myler	33	7.0	+7.0
Registered electors		1,530		
Rejected ballots		12	2.5	
Turnout		484	31.6	
Liberal Democrats hold		Swing		

=== Askham ===
Askham (1 seat)
Party	Candidate	Votes	%	±%
Liberal Democrats	Laura Harker	236	59.3	+15.5
Conservative	Henry Fearon	162	40.7	−15.5
Registered electors		1,047		
Rejected ballots		11	2.7	
Turnout		409	39.1	
Liberal Democrats gain from Conservative		Swing		

=== Brough ===
Brough (1 seat)
Party	Candidate	Votes	%	±%
Liberal Democrats	Graham Simpkins	234	50.8	N/A
Conservative	Maurice Hall	194	42.1	N/A
Labour	Christopher Cheetham	33	7.2	N/A
Registered electors		1,096		
Rejected ballots		8	1.7	
Turnout		469	42.8	
Liberal Democrats gain from Independent		Swing		

=== Crosby Ravensworth ===
Crosby Ravensworth (1 seat)
Party	Candidate	Votes	%	±%
Conservative	Joan Raine*	321	62.9	+62.9
Liberal Democrats	Liz Kerrey	189	37.1	N/A
Registered electors		1,187		
Rejected ballots		18	3.4	
Turnout		528	44.5	
Conservative hold		Swing		

=== Dacre ===
Dacre (1 seat)
Party	Candidate	Votes	%	±%
Liberal Democrats	Judith Derbyshire*	370	77.6	+21.5
Conservative	Jason Shaw	107	22.4	N/A
Registered electors		1,185		
Rejected ballots		7	1.4	
Turnout		484	40.8	
Liberal Democrats hold		Swing		

=== Eamont ===
Eamont (1 seat)
Party	Candidate	Votes	%	±%
Conservative	Ian Chambers*	228	47.4	+47.4
Putting Cumbria First	Jonathan Davies	152	31.6	N/A
Liberal Democrats	John Banks	101	21.0	N/A
Registered electors		1,263		
Rejected ballots		8	1.6	
Turnout		489	38.7	
Conservative hold		Swing		

=== Greystoke ===
Greystoke (1 seat)
Party	Candidate	Votes	%	±%
Conservative	Debra Wicks	Unopposed	N/A	±0.0
Turnout		N/A	N/A	
Conservative hold		Swing		

=== Hartside ===
Hartside (1 seat)
Party	Candidate	Votes	%	±%
Conservative	Robin Orchard*	Unopposed	N/A	−56.7
Turnout		N/A	N/A	
Conservative hold		Swing		

=== Hesket ===
Hesket (2 seats)
Party	Candidate	Votes	%	±%
Conservative	Elaine Martin*	443	51.0	−13.0
Independent	David Ryland	372	42.8	N/A
Conservative	Lesley Grisedale*	336	38.7	−9.6
Green	Richard O'Brien	269	31.0	N/A
Registered electors		2,490		
Rejected ballots		3	0.3	
Turnout		872	35.0	
Conservative hold		Swing		
Independent gain from Conservative		Swing		

=== Kirkby Stephen ===
Kirkby Stephen (2 seats)
Party	Candidate	Votes	%	±%
Conservative	Phil Dew	494	60.8	+60.8
Independent	Sandy Lancaster	368	45.3	N/A
Liberal Democrats	Donna Garner	173	21.3	N/A
Labour	Ian Simkins	104	12.8	N/A
Labour	Neil Cleeveley	96	11.8	N/A
Registered electors		2,043		
Rejected ballots		3	0.4	
Turnout		816	39.9	
Conservative hold		Swing		
Independent gain from Independent		Swing		

=== Kirkby Thore ===
Kirkby Thore (1 seat)
Party	Candidate	Votes	%	±%
Independent	Henry Sawrey-Cookson*	243	49.1	+49.1
Liberal Democrats	Lorna Baker	167	33.7	N/A
Conservative	Sean Quinn	85	17.2	N/A
Registered electors		1,182		
Rejected ballots		9	1.8	
Turnout		504	42.6	
Independent hold		Swing		

=== Kirkoswald ===
Kirkoswald (1 seat)
Party	Candidate	Votes	%	±%
Independent	Mary Robinson*	325	72.7	+72.7
Labour	John Potts	68	15.2	N/A
Conservative	Olivia Bateman	54	12.1	N/A
Registered electors		1,160		
Rejected ballots		10	2.2	
Turnout		457	39.4	
Independent hold		Swing		

=== Langwathby ===
Langwathby (1 seat)
Party	Candidate	Votes	%	±%
Independent	Douglas Banks*	347	69.3	+13.4
Green	Richard Henry	102	20.4	N/A
Conservative	Michael Beveridge	52	10.4	−16.6
Registered electors		1,228		
Rejected ballots		2	0.4	
Turnout		503	41.0	
Independent hold		Swing		

=== Lazonby ===
Lazonby (1 seat)
Party	Candidate	Votes	%	±%
Conservative	Gordon Nicolson*	232	50.5	+50.5
Green	Wade Tidbury	227	49.5	N/A
Registered electors		1,227		
Rejected ballots		11	2.3	
Turnout		470	38.3	
Conservative hold		Swing		

=== Long Marton ===
Long Marton (1 seat)
Party	Candidate	Votes	%	±%
Conservative	Maurice Armstrong*	Unopposed	N/A	±0.0
Turnout		N/A	N/A	
Conservative hold		Swing		

=== Morland ===
Morland (1 seat)
Party	Candidate	Votes	%	±%
Independent	Michael Tonkin*	248	59.3	+59.3
Liberal Democrats	Neil Hughes	87	20.8	N/A
Conservative	Isa Henderson	83	19.9	N/A
Registered electors		1,057		
Rejected ballots		4	0.9	
Turnout		422	39.9	
Independent hold		Swing		

=== Orton with Tebay ===
Orton with Tebay (1 seat)
Party	Candidate	Votes	%	±%
Conservative	John Todd	250	63.8	+63.8
Liberal Democrats	Shelagh Medic	142	36.2	N/A
Registered electors		1,129		
Rejected ballots		15	3.7	
Turnout		407	36.0	
Conservative hold		Swing		

=== Penrith Carleton ===
Penrith Carleton (1 seat)
Party	Candidate	Votes	%	±%
Green	Douglas Lawson	439	76.9	N/A
Conservative	Paula Breen*	132	23.1	−43.4
Registered electors		1,419		
Rejected ballots		1	0.2	
Turnout		572	40.3	
Green gain from Conservative		Swing		

=== Penrith East ===
Penrith East (2 seats)
Party	Candidate	Votes	%	±%
Liberal Democrats	Michael Denis Eyles*	375	63.0	+63.0
Conservative	John Charles Lynch*	271	45.5	+45.5
Labour	James Fallows	176	29.6	N/A
Registered electors		2,315		
Rejected ballots		16	2.6	
Turnout		611	26.4	
Liberal Democrats hold		Swing		
Conservative hold		Swing		

=== Penrith North ===
Penrith North (3 seats)
Party	Candidate	Votes	%	±%
Liberal Democrats	Deb Holden*	898	76.4	+27.1
Liberal Democrats	Mark Rudhall*	736	62.6	+19.4
Green	Ali Ross	679	57.8	N/A
Conservative	Scott Jackson*	311	26.5	−10.2
Conservative	David Whipp	236	20.1	−15.3
Putting Cumbria First	Lucian Toma	223	19.0	N/A
Registered electors		3,327		
Rejected ballots		8	0.7	
Turnout		1,183	35.6	
Liberal Democrats hold		Swing		
Liberal Democrats hold		Swing		
Green gain from Conservative		Swing		

=== Penrith Pategill ===
Penrith Pategill (1 seat)
Party	Candidate	Votes	%	±%
Liberal Democrats	Peter Baker	164	62.4	+62.4
Conservative	Gillian Barnes	65	24.7	N/A
Labour	Hilary Snell	34	12.9	N/A
Registered electors		1,022		
Rejected ballots		2	0.8	
Turnout		265	25.9	
Liberal Democrats hold		Swing		

=== Penrith South ===
Penrith South (2 seats)
Party	Candidate	Votes	%	±%
Independent	Paul Connor	261	48.1	N/A
Independent	Margaret Clark*	256	47.1	−2.6
Conservative	Helen Fearon	210	38.7	−14.3
Labour	Nicola Hawkins	94	17.3	N/A
Registered electors		2,048		
Rejected ballots		3	0.5	
Turnout		546	26.7	
Independent gain from Conservative		Swing		
Independent hold		Swing		

=== Penrith West ===
Penrith West (2 seats)
Party	Candidate	Votes	%	±%
Liberal Democrats	Virginia Taylor*	283	51.1	+6.2
Conservative	John Thompson*	159	28.7	−14.1
Labour	Dave Knaggs	154	27.8	−9.5
Labour	Neil Thompson	108	19.5	N/A
UKIP	Mary Dixon	100	18.1	N/A
Registered electors		2,298		
Rejected ballots		1	0.2	
Turnout		555	24.2	
Liberal Democrats hold		Swing		
Conservative hold		Swing		

=== Ravenstonedale ===
Ravenstonedale (1 seat)
Party	Candidate	Votes	%	±%
Conservative	Angela Meadowcroft*	127	50.8	+50.8
Liberal Democrats	Kelvyn James	123	49.2	N/A
Registered electors		794		
Rejected ballots		10	3.8	
Turnout		260	32.7	
Conservative hold		Swing		

=== Shap ===
Shap (1 seat)
Party	Candidate	Votes	%	±%
Conservative	John Owen*	273	51.1	+51.1
Liberal Democrats	Neil McCall	167	31.3	N/A
Putting Cumbria First	Kerryanne Wilde	94	17.6	N/A
Registered electors		1,089		
Rejected ballots		10	1.8	
Turnout		544	50.0	
Conservative hold		Swing		

=== Skelton ===
Skelton (1 seat)
Party	Candidate	Votes	%	±%
Conservative	Kevin Beaty*	275	60.2	+60.2
Liberal Democrats	Tim Strevens	182	39.8	N/A
Registered electors		1,172		
Rejected ballots		6	1.3	
Turnout		463	39.5	
Conservative hold		Swing		

=== Ullswater ===
Ullswater (1 seat)
Party	Candidate	Votes	%	±%
Liberal Democrats	Darrell Smith	214	52.2	N/A
Conservative	Alistair Hogg*	196	47.8	+47.8
Registered electors		1,058		
Rejected ballots		13	3.1	
Turnout		423	40.0	
Liberal Democrats gain from Conservative		Swing		

=== Warcop ===
Warcop (1 seat)
Party	Candidate	Votes	%	±%
Independent	William Patterson*	226	61.2	+61.2
Conservative	Graham Cox	72	19.5	N/A
Green	Kimberley Lawson	71	19.2	N/A
Registered electors		1,075		
Rejected ballots		6	1.6	
Turnout		375	34.9	
Independent hold		Swing		

== Changes 2019–2023 ==
- May 2019: A coalition of the Liberal Democrats, the Independent Group and Labour formed the council's executive after the election.
- 30 March 2021: Eden's Independent group split into two factions. Mary Robinson, Karen Greenwood, William Patterson, Douglas Banks and Michael Tonkin formed the Independent Alliance, while Margaret Clark led the remaining Independent group.
- 1 April 2023: Eden District Council was abolished and its functions transferred to the new Westmorland and Furness Council, which also replaced Barrow Borough Council, South Lakeland District Council and Cumbria County Council.

=== By-elections ===
==== Penrith South ====
Penrith South (1 seat), 5 September 2019
Party	Candidate	Votes	%	±%
Conservative	Helen Fearon	222	46.3	+7.6
Independent	Lee Quinn	189	39.4	−8.7
Labour	Dave Knaggs	46	9.6	−7.7
Putting Cumbria First	Kerryanne Wilde	23	4.8	N/A
Rejected ballots		1	0.2	
Turnout		481	23.6	
Conservative gain from Independent		Swing		

The by-election was triggered by the death of Independent councillor Paul Connor in July 2019.

==== Shap ====
Shap (1 seat), 14 November 2019
Party	Candidate	Votes	%	±%
Registered electors		1,109		
Rejected ballots		2	0.5	
Liberal Democrats	Neil McCall	184	48.5	+17.2
Conservative	Sean Quinn	128	33.8	−17.3
Putting Cumbria First	Kerryanne Wilde	67	17.7	+0.1
Turnout		379	34.4	
Liberal Democrats gain from Conservative		Swing		

The by-election was triggered by the resignation of Conservative councillor John Owen.

==== Hartside ====
Hartside (1 seat), 6 May 2021
Party	Candidate	Votes	%	±%
Conservative	Raymond Briggs	194	45.1	+45.1
No Description	Susan Castle-Clarke	101	23.5	N/A
Labour	Dave Knaggs	94	21.9	N/A
Independent	Nikita Parks	41	9.5	N/A
Rejected ballots		1	0.2	
Turnout		431	38.1	
Conservative hold		Swing		

The by-election was triggered by the death of Conservative councillor Robin Orchard in October 2020.

==== Skelton ====
Skelton (1 seat), 6 May 2021
Party	Candidate	Votes	%	±%
Registered electors		1,218		
Rejected ballots		4	0.7	
Conservative	Colin Atkinson	302	54.4	−5.8
Liberal Democrats	Roger Burgin	131	23.6	−16.2
Green	Belinda Lloyd	81	14.6	N/A
Labour	Hilary Snell	41	7.4	N/A
Turnout		559	45.9	
Conservative hold		Swing		

The by-election was triggered by the resignation of Conservative councillor Kevin Beaty.

==== Penrith West ====
Penrith West (1 seat), 30 September 2021
Party	Candidate	Votes	%	±%
Registered electors		2,320		
Rejected ballots		0	0.0	
Liberal Democrats	Roger Burgin	173	43.5	−7.6
Conservative	Dale Normington	87	21.9	−6.8
Independent	Jeff Thomson	51	12.8	N/A
Labour	Dave Knaggs	40	10.1	−17.7
Putting Cumbria First	Jonathan Davies	28	7.0	N/A
Green	Richard O'Brien	19	4.8	N/A
Turnout		398	17.2	
Liberal Democrats gain from Conservative		Swing		

The by-election was triggered by the resignation of Conservative councillor John Thompson.
