= 2011 Allerdale Borough Council election =

2011 UK local government election

Map of the results of the 2011 Allerdale council election. Labour in red, Independents in grey and Conservatives in blue.

The 2011 Allerdale Borough Council election took place on 5 May 2011 to elect members of Allerdale Borough Council in Cumbria, England. The whole council was up for election and the council stayed under no overall control.

== Results ==
The results saw the Labour Party make 6 gains to win exactly half of the 56 seats on the council, 1 short of a majority. Labour gains included the former leader of the council, Mark Fryer, who took Stainburn ward from the Conservatives by 2 votes. The Conservatives lost 5 seats to have 12 councillors, including losses in All Saints Cockermouth and Broughton St Bridgets. 16 independents were elected, including gains in Broughton St Bridgets and Netherhall Maryport. No other party won any seats on council, with the Liberal Democrats losing 2 seats in Harrington Workington as the party was wiped out. Overall turnout for the election was 46.19%.

Following the election Labour said it intended to take control of the council as a minority administration replacing the previous alliance between the Conservatives, Liberal Democrats and 7 independents.

Allerdale local election result 2011
Party	Seats	Gains	Losses	Net gain/loss	Seats %	Votes %	Votes	+/−
Labour	28	8	2	+6	50.0	52.3	25,637	+7.0%
Independent	16	6	2	+4	28.6	22.2	10,856	-3.3%
Conservative	12	0	6	-6	21.4	19.2	9,406	-1.9%
Liberal Democrats	0	0	4	-4	0	2.5	1,213	-1.6%
Green	0	0	0	0	0	2.0	985	+0.9%
BNP	0	0	0	0	0	1.8	893	-1.1%

3 Conservative, 3 independent and 1 Labour candidates were unopposed.

=== By ward ===
All Saints Cockermouth (3)
Party	Candidate	Votes	%	±%
Labour	Alan Smith	1,062		
Labour	Len Davies	884		
Labour	Christine Smith	848		
Conservative	Alan Tyson	751		
Conservative	Hilary Hope	719		
Conservative	Kenneth Scales	663		
Liberal Democrats	Juliet Henderson	258		
Turnout		5,185	52.5	+3
Labour hold		Swing		
Labour gain from Conservative		Swing		
Labour gain from Conservative		Swing		

Aspatria (2)
Party	Candidate	Votes	%	±%
Independent	Bill Finlay	401		
Independent	David Wilson	361		
Labour	Laurie Mansfield	344		
Liberal Democrats	Philip Roberts	253		
Labour	Billy Pegram	216		
Turnout		1,575	39	+1
Independent hold		Swing		
Independent hold		Swing		

Boltons
Party	Candidate	Votes	%	±%
Independent	Joe Mumberson	504	66.2	
Conservative	Graham Sadler	257	33.8	
Majority		247	32.5	
Turnout		761	53.6	
Independent hold		Swing		

Broughton St Bridgets (2)
Party	Candidate	Votes	%	±%
Independent	Nicky Cockburn	715		
Independent	Tony North	675		
Labour	John Ardron	648		
Labour	Brian Campbell	578		
Turnout		2,616	51.2	+4
Independent gain from Conservative		Swing		
Independent gain from Labour		Swing		

Christchurch Cockermouth (2)
Party	Candidate	Votes	%	±%
Conservative	Margaret Jackson	639		
Conservative	Sam Standage	583		
Labour	Julie Laidlow	550		
Labour	Andrew Graham	543		
Liberal Democrats	Eleanor Snowden	165		
Green	Michael Baron	162		
Turnout		2,642	50.7	+15
Conservative hold		Swing		
Conservative hold		Swing		

Clifton
Party	Candidate	Votes	%	±%
Labour	Phillip Tibble	364	64.9	+16.5
Independent	Heather McIntosh	197	35.1	+35.1
Majority		167	29.8	
Turnout		561	45.5	−3
Labour gain from Liberal Democrats		Swing		

Crummock
Party	Candidate	Votes	%	±%
Conservative	Eric Nicholson	491	63.0	−5.3
Labour	Ann Bales	109	14.0	+14.0
Green	Jill Perry	95	12.2	−19.5
Liberal Democrats	Roger Peck	84	10.8	+10.8
Majority		382	49.0	+12.4
Turnout		779	62.0	+9
Conservative hold		Swing		

Dalton
Party	Candidate	Votes	%	±%
Independent	Chris Garrard	456	63.3	
Labour	Emma Holding	167	23.2	
Green	Flic Crowley	97	13.5	
Majority		289	40.1	
Turnout		720	50.5	
Independent gain from Conservative		Swing		

Derwent Valley
Party	Candidate	Votes	%	±%
Conservative	Timothy Heslop	486	74.4	
Labour	Peter Cross	167	25.6	
Majority		319	48.9	
Turnout		653	53.2	
Conservative hold		Swing		

Ellen (2)
Party	Candidate	Votes	%	±%
Labour	John Colhoun	484		
Labour	Louise Maguire	391		
Independent	Jeanette Martin	356		
Conservative	Mike Johnson	277		
Green	Geoff Smith	193		
Turnout		1,701	44.0	+8
Labour hold		Swing		
Labour hold		Swing		

Ellenborough Maryport (2)
Party	Candidate	Votes	%	±%
Labour	Janice Wood	693		
Labour	Martin Wood	674		
BNP	Dawn Charlton	308		
Turnout		1,675	38.3	+3
Labour hold		Swing		
Labour hold		Swing		

Ewanrigg Maryport (2)
Party	Candidate	Votes	%	±%
Labour	Carni McCarron-Holmes	679		
Labour	Ashley Moore	604		
Maryport 4 Maryport Independent	Mark Hayhurst	182		
BNP	Jennifer Matthys	136		
Turnout		1,601	38.7	+2
Labour hold		Swing		
Labour hold		Swing		

Flimby
Party	Candidate	Votes	%	±%
Labour	Peter Kendall	342	71.1	
Conservative	Fiona Buchanan	83	17.3	
BNP	David Wilson	56	11.6	
Majority		259	53.8	
Turnout		481	39.1	
Labour hold		Swing		

Harrington Workington (2)
Party	Candidate	Votes	%	±%
Labour	Marjorie Rae	642		
Independent	Hilary Harrington	412		
Liberal Democrats	Ian Francis	382		
Labour	Jim Osborn	345		
Turnout		1,781	45.1	+5
Labour gain from Liberal Democrats		Swing		
Independent gain from Liberal Democrats		Swing		

Holme
Party	Candidate	Votes	%	±%
Conservative	Tony Markley	unopposed		
Conservative hold		Swing		

Keswick (3)
Party	Candidate	Votes	%	±%
Labour	Denstone Kemp	unopposed		
Conservative	Ron Munby	unopposed		
Independent	David Robinson	unopposed		
Labour hold		Swing		
Conservative hold		Swing		
Independent gain from Liberal Democrats		Swing		

Marsh
Party	Candidate	Votes	%	±%
Conservative	Derick Hodgson	unopposed		
Conservative hold		Swing		

Moorclose Workington (3)
Party	Candidate	Votes	%	±%
Labour	Peter Bales	719		
Labour	Joan Wright	629		
Independent	Denis Robertson	608		
Independent	Stephen Stoddart	526		
Labour	Neil Schofield	511		
Turnout		2,993	42.7	−12
Labour hold		Swing		
Labour hold		Swing		
Independent hold		Swing		

Moss Bay Workington (3)
Party	Candidate	Votes	%	±%
Labour	Barbara Cannon	620		
Labour	Carole Armstrong	596		
Labour	Bill Bacon	572		
Independent	John Bracken	395		
Turnout		2,183	34.5	+8
Labour hold		Swing		
Labour hold		Swing		
Labour hold		Swing		

Netherhall Maryport (2)
Party	Candidate	Votes	%	±%
Independent	George Kemp	483		
Labour	Angela Kendall	422		
Labour	Jeff Gardner	387		
Independent	Andy Long	273		
Green	Diane Standen	88		
BNP	Angus Matthys	76		
Turnout		1,729	44.2	
Independent gain from Labour		Swing		
Labour hold		Swing		

Seaton (3)
Party	Candidate	Votes	%	±%
Independent	Trevor Fee	1,055		
Labour	Celia Tibble	779		
Independent	Mirriam Gainford	641		
Labour	Andrew Lawson	586		
Green	Alistair Grey	304		
Turnout		3,365	43.2	+3
Independent hold		Swing		
Labour gain from Independent		Swing		
Independent hold		Swing		

Silloth (2)
Party	Candidate	Votes	%	±%
Independent	Bill Jefferson	unopposed		
Independent	Margaret Snaith	unopposed		
Independent hold		Swing		
Independent hold		Swing		

Solway
Party	Candidate	Votes	%	±%
Conservative	Jim Lister	365	61.3	
Labour	Marcus Cosgrove	230	38.7	
Majority		135	22.7	
Turnout		595	46	
Conservative hold		Swing		

St Johns Workington (3)
Party	Candidate	Votes	%	±%
Labour	Joe Holliday	1,156		
Labour	Michael Heaslip	1,019		
Labour	Konrad Hansen	942		
Conservative	Michael Davidson	589		
Conservative	Simon Collins	542		
BNP	Carl Edgar	122		
Turnout		4,370	56.6	+20
Labour hold		Swing		
Labour hold		Swing		
Labour gain from Conservative		Swing		

St Michaels Workington (3)
Party	Candidate	Votes	%	±%
Labour	Mary Bainbridge	935		
Labour	Billy Miskelly	741		
Labour	Carl Holding	690		
Independent	Elsie Johnsen	682		
Independent	Grahame Hayton	444		
Turnout		3,492	41.9	+18
Labour hold		Swing		
Labour hold		Swing		
Labour gain from Independent		Swing		

Stainburn Workington
Party	Candidate	Votes	%	±%
Labour	Mark Fryer	301	47.6	+22.8
Conservative	Robert Hardon	299	47.2	−10.4
Liberal Democrats	Margaret Bennett	33	5.2	−12.4
Majority		2	0.3	
Turnout		633	45.8	+11
Labour gain from Conservative		Swing		

Wampool
Party	Candidate	Votes	%	±%
Conservative	Stuart Moffat	472	75.2	
Labour	Nathan Wilson	156	24.8	
Majority		316	50.3	
Turnout		628	46.6	
Conservative hold		Swing		

Warnell
Party	Candidate	Votes	%	±%
Conservative	Duncan Fairbairn	679	75.8	
Labour	Eric Wright	217	24.2	
Majority		462	51.6	
Turnout		896	57.4	
Conservative hold		Swing		

Waver
Party	Candidate	Votes	%	±%
Conservative	Joe Cowell	421	69.2	
Labour	Lynda Stephenson	187	30.8	
Majority		234	38.5	
Turnout		608	41.9	
Conservative hold		Swing		

Wharrels
Party	Candidate	Votes	%	±%
Conservative	Jacqueline Mounsey	376	56.5	
Labour	Brian Cope	205	30.8	
Green	Helen Graham	46	6.9	
Liberal Democrats	Magrit Scott	38	5.7	
Majority		171	25.7	
Turnout		665	53.2	
Conservative hold		Swing		

Wigton (3)
Party	Candidate	Votes	%	±%
Labour	John Crouch	843		
Independent	George Scott	756		
Independent	Binky Armstrong	734		
Conservative	Brian Warren	714		
Labour	Sheelagh Delaney	458		
Labour	Bill Goldsmith	402		
BNP	Paul Stafford	195		
Turnout		4,102	39.9	+6
Labour hold		Swing		
Independent hold		Swing		
Independent hold		Swing		
