= Parsonby =

Hamlet in Cumbria, England

Coordinates: 54.737°N 3.332°W

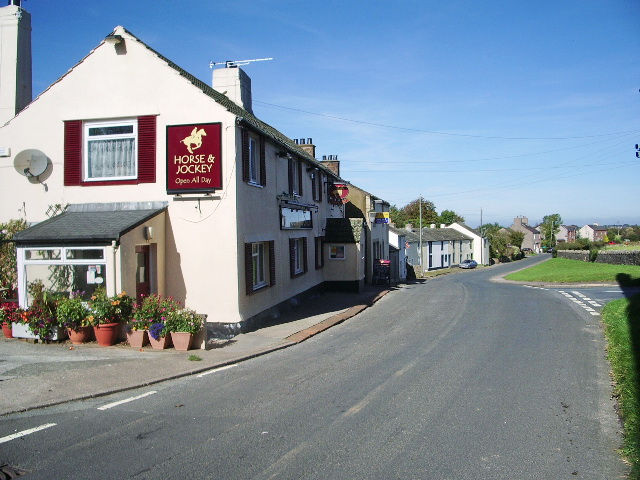

- Location in Allerdale, Cumbria Location within Cumbria
- OS grid reference: NY142388
- Civil parish: Plumbland
- Unitary authority: Cumberland
- Ceremonial county: Cumbria
- Region: North West
- Country: England
- Sovereign state: United Kingdom
- Post town: WIGTON
- Postcode district: CA7
- Dialling code: 016973
- Police: Cumbria
- Fire: Cumbria
- Ambulance: North West
- UK Parliament: Penrith and Solway

Parsonby is a hamlet in the civil parish of Plumbland, in the Cumberland district, in the ceremonial of Cumbria, England. It is located on the B5301 road, south of Aspatria.

== Governance ==
Parsonby, is part of the Penrith and Solway constituency of the UK parliament. From 1974 to 2023 it was in Allerdale district.

The village also has its own Parish Council jointly with nearby Plumbland; Plumbland Parish Council Parish Council.

== See also ==
- Listed buildings in Plumbland
