= Listed buildings in Bothel and Threapland =

Bothel and Threapland is a civil parish in the Cumberland district in Cumbria, England. It contains nine listed buildings that are recorded in the National Heritage List for England. All the listed buildings are designated at Grade II, the lowest of the three grades, which is applied to "buildings of national importance and special interest". The parish contains the villages of Bothel and Threapland, and is otherwise rural. Apart from a milestone, all the listed buildings are houses, farmhouses, or farm buildings.

== Buildings ==
Name and location	Photograph	Date	Notes
Threapland Hall; 54.74131°N 3.31110°W	—	Late 15th or early 16th century	The hall, later used as a farmhouse, was extended in the 19th century. It has thick roughcast walls and a green slate roof, and has three storeys and three bays. The doorway has a chamfered surround and an inscribed hood mould lintel. The windows are sashes, and on the left return is a stair window.
Farewell Grange and barns 54.74172°N 3.31264°W	—	1696	The farmhouse and barns are in rubble on a projecting stone plinth and have green slate roofs. The house has two storeys and three bays, and on the left is a barn with an L-shaped plan. The doorway has an architrave and an inscribed and dated lintel, and the windows are sashes. The barn contains plank doors and casement windows. Inside the house is a bressumer.
Bothel Hall; 54.74100°N 3.27131°W	—	Mid 18th century	A rendered farmhouse with a green slate roof, in two storeys and three bays. The windows are sashes, some of which are double.
St Bathan's Lodge; 54.73571°N 3.27448°W	—	Mid or late 18th century	Formerly an inn, later converted into a private house, it is stuccoed on a chamfered plinth, and has quoins and a green slate roof. There are two storeys and originally three bays, with a later two-bay extension to the left. The doorways have fanlights, and the windows are sashes.
Brisco House; 54.73651°N 3.27486°W	—	Late 18th century	A stuccoed house on a chamfered plinth with an eaves cornice, quoins, and a tile roof. It has two storeys and three bays, and on the left is a lower single-bay extension with a green slate roof. The doorway has an architrave with a pediment. The windows are sashes, those in the main part of the house with architraves.
Overgates; 54.74670°N 3.26696°W	—	Late 18th century	An extension was added to the farmhouse in the 19th century. The house is stuccoed, with quoins and a green slate roof. There are two storeys and three bays, and a lower two-bay extension to the left. The central doorway has an architrave and a shaped pediment, and the windows are sashes.
High House; 54.73649°N 3.27543°W	—	Late 18th or early 19th century	A stuccoed house on a chamfered plinth with an eaves cornice, angle pilasters, and a green slate roof. There are two storeys and three bays. The doorway has a Tuscan doorcase with an open pediment and a radial fanlight. The windows are sashes.
Milestone; 54.73948°N 3.27288°W	—	Late 18th or early 19th century	The milestone was provided for the Carlisle-Cockermouth Turnpike. It is in sandstone, and has a round top, a curved face, and a cast iron plate. The plate is inscribed with the distances in miles to Carlisle, Wigton and Cockermouth.
Skiddaw View; 54.73684°N 3.27538°W	—	Early 19th century	A stuccoed house on a chamfered plinth, with an eaves cornice, quoins, and a Welsh slate roof. The doorway has a pilastered surround and a radial fanlight, and the windows are sashes.
