= 2003 Allerdale Borough Council election =

2003 UK local government election

Map of the results of the 2003 Allerdale council election. Labour in red, Conservatives in blue, Independents in grey and Liberal Democrats in yellow.

Elections to Allerdale Borough Council were held on 1 May 2003. The whole council was up for election and the Labour party lost overall control of the council to no overall control.

== Results ==
Allerdale local election result 2003
Party	Seats	Gains	Losses	Net gain/loss	Seats %	Votes %	Votes	+/−
Labour	27	0	9	-9	48.2	44.0	14,159	-8.1%
Conservative	15	7	0	+7	26.8	19.6	6,313	-0.5%
Independent	9	5	1	+4	16.1	23.1	7,411	+11.4%
Liberal Democrats	5	0	2	-2	8.9	12.4	4,000	-3.1%
BNP	0	0	0	0	0	0.8	261	+0.8%

12 Labour, 4 Conservative, 2 Independent and 2 Liberal Democrat candidates were unopposed.

=== By ward ===
All Saints Cockermouth (3)
Party	Candidate	Votes	%	±%
Labour	Alan Smith	717		
Conservative	Samuel Standage	630		
Labour	Dianne Moyes	624		
Labour	Christine Smith	601		
Conservative	William Newton	599		
Conservative	Alan Tyson	524		
Turnout		3,695	36	
Labour hold		Swing		
Conservative hold		Swing		
Labour hold		Swing		

Aspatria (2)
Party	Candidate	Votes	%	±%
Labour	Gerald Sewell	488		
Independent	David Wilson	469		
Independent	Dorothy Tinnion	430		
Labour	Jacqueline Stagg	365		
Turnout		1,752	40	
Labour hold		Swing		
Independent hold		Swing		

Boltons
Party	Candidate	Votes	%	±%
Independent	Joseph Mumberson	uncontested		
Independent hold		Swing		

Broughton St Bridgets (2)
Party	Candidate	Votes	%	±%
Labour	James Askew	uncontested		
Labour	Keith Sproat	uncontested		
Labour hold		Swing		
Labour hold		Swing		

Christchurch Cockermouth (2)
Party	Candidate	Votes	%	±%
Conservative	Christine Jackson	543		
Conservative	Leslie Lytollis	497		
Labour	Isabel Burns	330		
Labour	John Moore	253		
Turnout		1,623	32	
Conservative hold		Swing		
Conservative hold		Swing		

Clifton
Party	Candidate	Votes	%	±%
Labour	Maureen Rourke	371	67.0	+16.0
Liberal Democrats	Dean Hudson	183	33.0	−16.0
Majority		188	34.0	+32.0
Turnout		554	46	+5
Labour hold		Swing		

Crummock
Party	Candidate	Votes	%	±%
Conservative	Joseph Milburn	uncontested		
Conservative hold		Swing		

Dalton
Party	Candidate	Votes	%	±%
Conservative	Simon Greenwood	uncontested		
Conservative hold		Swing		

Derwent Valley
Party	Candidate	Votes	%	±%
Conservative	Timothy Heslop	256	54.8	−24.3
Liberal Democrats	David Robinson	211	45.2	+45.2
Majority		45	9.6	−48.6
Turnout		467	35	+0
Conservative hold		Swing		

Ellen (2)
Party	Candidate	Votes	%	±%
Labour	John Colhoun	uncontested		
Labour	David Thomas	uncontested		
Labour hold		Swing		
Labour hold		Swing		

Ellenborough Maryport (2)
Party	Candidate	Votes	%	±%
Labour	Martin Wood	uncontested		
Labour	Janice Wood	uncontested		
Labour hold		Swing		
Labour hold		Swing		

Ewanrigg Maryport (2)
Party	Candidate	Votes	%	±%
Labour	Carneen McCarron-Holmes	uncontested		
Labour	Patricia McCracken	uncontested		
Labour hold		Swing		
Labour hold		Swing		

Flimby
Party	Candidate	Votes	%	±%
Labour	Peter Kendall	uncontested		
Labour hold		Swing		

Harrington Workington (2)
Party	Candidate	Votes	%	±%
Liberal Democrats	Allan Caine	601		
Liberal Democrats	Ian Francis	515		
Labour	James Osborn	280		
Labour	Michael Smith	222		
Turnout		1,618	34	
Liberal Democrats hold		Swing		
Liberal Democrats hold		Swing		

Holme
Party	Candidate	Votes	%	±%
Conservative	Anthony Markley	141	37.3	
Independent	William Douglas	95	25.1	
Labour	Mark Kidd	95	25.1	
Liberal Democrats	Margrit Scott	47	12.4	
Majority		46	12.2	
Turnout		378	30	
Conservative gain from Labour		Swing		

Keswick (3)
Party	Candidate	Votes	%	±%
Liberal Democrats	Elizabeth Barraclough	1,076		
Conservative	Ronald Munby	696		
Labour	Denstone Kemp	581		
Independent	John Walker	567		
Turnout		2,920	36	
Liberal Democrats hold		Swing		
Conservative gain from Independent		Swing		
Labour hold		Swing		

Marsh
Party	Candidate	Votes	%	±%
Liberal Democrats	Jennifer Gallagher	uncontested		
Liberal Democrats hold		Swing		

Moorclose Workington (3)
Party	Candidate	Votes	%	±%
Labour	Joan Minto	567		
Labour	Peter Bales	542		
Labour	Philip Tibble	418		
Liberal Democrats	Linda Walker	285		
Liberal Democrats	Christine Johanssen	279		
Liberal Democrats	John Morley	266		
Turnout		2,357	24	
Labour hold		Swing		
Labour hold		Swing		
Labour hold		Swing		

Moss Bay Workington (3)
Party	Candidate	Votes	%	±%
Labour	Lillian Baldry	613		
Labour	Derek Thompson	531		
Labour	Nicholas Hardy	485		
Independent	John Bracken	228		
Liberal Democrats	Shaun Heywood	173		
Turnout		2,030	25	
Labour hold		Swing		
Labour hold		Swing		
Labour hold		Swing		

Netherhall Maryport (2)
Party	Candidate	Votes	%	±%
Labour	Jeffrey Gardner	uncontested		
Labour	Angela Kendall	uncontested		
Labour hold		Swing		
Labour hold		Swing		

Seaton (3)
Party	Candidate	Votes	%	±%
Independent	Joseph Sandwith	1,050		
Independent	Trevor Fee	785		
Labour	James Musgrave	644		
Labour	Denis Tytek	492		
Labour	Mark Fryer	431		
Turnout		3,402	37	
Independent gain from Labour		Swing		
Independent gain from Labour		Swing		
Labour hold		Swing		

Silloth (2)
Party	Candidate	Votes	%	±%
Independent	William Jefferson	uncontested		
Labour	Margaret Snaith	uncontested		
Independent hold		Swing		
Labour hold		Swing		

Solway
Party	Candidate	Votes	%	±%
Conservative	James Buchanan	274	57.3	
Independent	Dorothy Tinnion	87	18.2	
Independent	Janice Nott	69	14.4	
Labour	Mark Kidd	48	10.0	
Majority		187	39.1	
Turnout		478	36	
Conservative gain from Labour		Swing		

St Johns Workington (3)
Party	Candidate	Votes	%	±%
Conservative	John Heathcote	635		
Conservative	Robert Hardon	589		
Conservative	Michael Davidson	572		
Labour	John Robertson	472		
Labour	Daniel Dempsey	443		
Labour	Kenneth Hayton	388		
Turnout		3,099	28	
Conservative gain from Labour		Swing		
Conservative gain from Labour		Swing		
Conservative gain from Labour		Swing		

St Michaels Workington (3)
Party	Candidate	Votes	%	±%
Labour	Ivor Humes	705		
Labour	Alan Barry	673		
Independent	Jean Macleod	599		
Labour	Jack Fryer	570		
Independent	James Perkins	432		
Turnout		2,979	33	
Labour hold		Swing		
Labour hold		Swing		
Independent gain from Labour		Swing		

Stainburn Workington
Party	Candidate	Votes	%	±%
Conservative	Richard Jones	uncontested		
Conservative hold		Swing		

Wampool
Party	Candidate	Votes	%	±%
Liberal Democrats	Anne Holmes	uncontested		
Liberal Democrats hold		Swing		

Warnell
Party	Candidate	Votes	%	±%
Conservative	Duncan Fairbairn	357	63.5	+63.5
Liberal Democrats	Agnes Martin	205	36.5	−34.3
Majority		152	27.0	
Turnout		562	36	+3
Conservative gain from Liberal Democrats		Swing		

Waver
Party	Candidate	Votes	%	±%
Independent	Joseph Cowell	238	59.9	−17.4
Liberal Democrats	Patrick Short	159	40.1	+40.1
Majority		79	19.8	−44.8
Turnout		397	28	−2
Independent hold		Swing		

Wharrels
Party	Candidate	Votes	%	±%
Conservative	Robert Hobbs	uncontested		
Conservative hold		Swing		

Wigton (3)
Party	Candidate	Votes	%	±%
Independent	John Armstrong	917		
Independent	George Scott	898		
Labour	John Crouch	690		
Independent	Charles Miles	547		
Labour	William Goldsmith	274		
BNP	Paul Stafford	261		
Labour	William Walton	246		
Turnout		3,833	35	
Independent gain from Liberal Democrats		Swing		
Independent gain from Labour		Swing		
Labour hold		Swing		
