= Plumbland =

Village in Cumbria, England

Coordinates: 54.740°N 3.321°W

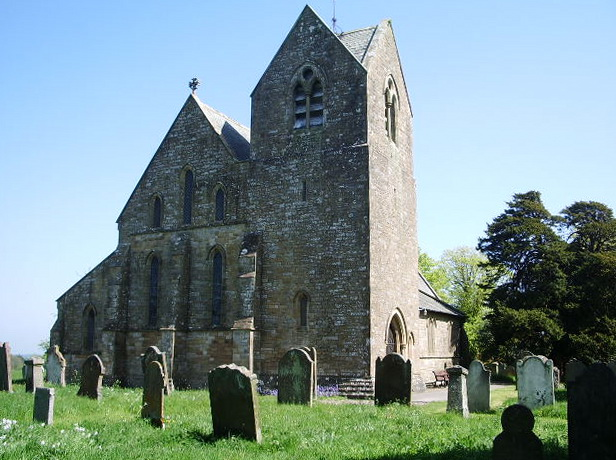
- St. Cuthbert's Church, Plumbland

- Location in Allerdale Location within Cumbria
- Population: 341 (2011)
- OS grid reference: NY149391
- Civil parish: Plumbland
- Unitary authority: Cumberland
- Ceremonial county: Cumbria
- Region: North West
- Country: England
- Sovereign state: United Kingdom
- Post town: WIGTON
- Postcode district: CA7
- Dialling code: 016973
- Police: Cumbria
- Fire: Cumbria
- Ambulance: North West
- UK Parliament: Penrith and Solway

Plumbland is a village and civil parish in the Cumberland district, in the ceremonial county of Cumbria, England. Situated towards the north west corner of the county, it is two miles from the outskirts of the Lake District National Park which is considered to be an Area of Outstanding Natural Beauty. The parish includes the hamlets of Threapland, Parsonby and Arkleby. In 2011 the parish had a population of 341.

== Governance ==
Plumbland was previously part of the Workington constituency of the UK Parliament but in the boundary changes of 2023 was moved to the new constituency of Penrith and Solway. In the General Election of 2024, Markus Campbell-Savours was returned as its first MP.

The village also has its own Parish Council jointly with nearby Parsonby; Plumbland Parish Council.

== See also ==
- Listed buildings in Plumbland
