= Bothel, Cumbria =

Village in Cumbria, England

Coordinates: 54.733°N 3.266°W

Bothel
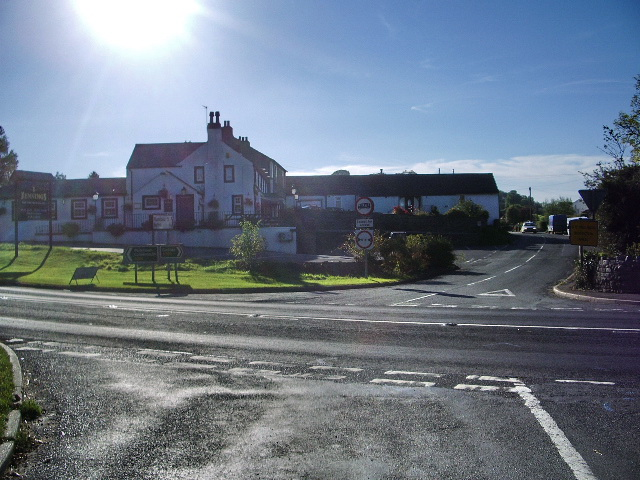
- The Greyhound Inn, Bothel

- Location in Allerdale Location within Cumbria
- OS grid reference: NY184383
- Civil parish: Bothel and Threapland
- Unitary authority: Cumberland
- Ceremonial county: Cumbria
- Region: North West
- Country: England
- Sovereign state: United Kingdom
- Post town: WIGTON
- Postcode district: CA7
- Dialling code: 01697
- Police: Cumbria
- Fire: Cumbria
- Ambulance: North West
- UK Parliament: Penrith and Solway

Bothel is a village in the civil parish of Bothel and Threapland, in the Cumberland district, in the ceremonial county of Cumbria, England. Bothel was historically within the county of Cumberland.

== Location ==
It is situated just off the main A595 road, 18 miles (29 km) from Carlisle, 12.6 mi (20 km) from Keswick and 7 miles (11 km) from Cockermouth.

The village is just outside the boundary of the Lake District National Park. The A591 road terminates just outside the village, linking Bothel to Bassenthwaite Lake and Keswick.

== Governance ==
The village is in the parliamentary constituency of Penrith and Solway, and has been represented by Markus Campbell-Savours of the Labour Party since the 2024 general election.

For Local Government purposes it is in the Cumberland unitary authority area.

The village also has its own Parish Council jointly with nearby Threapland; Bothel & Threapland Parish Council.

famous local residents include Betty Earle and Aubrey Cape ( missing since 1987)

== Transport ==
The village ha 2 bus routes operated by Stagecoach Cumbria. The 554 to Keswick or Carlisle via Wigton and the 600 to Whitehaven via Cockermouth or Carlisle via Wigton.

== See also ==
- Listed buildings in Bothel and Threapland
- Bothel and Threapland
