= Putting Cumbria First =

Political party in England

- Abbreviation: PCF
- Leader: Jonathan Davies
- Founder: Jonathan Davies
- Founded: 14 January 2019; 7 years ago
- Headquarters: Mile Lane; Penrith; Cumbria; CA11 0BX
- Membership: 190 (2019)
- Ideology: Localism
- Colours: Blue; Green

Website
- www.puttingcumbriafirst.co.uk

Putting Cumbria First (PCF), also known as CumbriaFirst, is a regional political party based in Penrith, Cumbria. It was founded in January 2019 by local businessman Jonathan Davies, with the goal of prioritising the interests of the people of Cumbria over national party politics.

The party currently has no elected representatives.

== Policies ==
The party's policies include:

- Increasing funding for schools
- Universal access to 4G networks
- Fully dualling the A66 and A69 roads
- Scrapping the Police and Crime Commissioner for Cumbria
- Increasing front-line police
- Support for a second Scottish Independence Referendum
- Opposition to local government cuts

The party's leader, Jonathan Davies, supports giving city status to the town of Barrow-in-Furness.

Davies also supports a single combined authority and a devolution deal for Cumbria's local government.

== Electoral performance ==
The party's leader, Jonathan Davies, had previously stood as an independent candidate for Penrith and the Border in the 2017 General Election. He came last with 0.9% of the vote.

The party stood three candidates for election to both Eden District Council and Carlisle City Council at the May 2019 local elections. None were successful. The party's first local councillor, Michael Little, was elected to Allerdale District Council at the same election. Five months after being elected, Little defected to the Conservative party, saying he had been impressed by their leadership of the council and was won over by Boris Johnson's commitment to "get Brexit done by October 31". Four months after that, in February 2020, Little rejoined Putting Cumbria First, after announcing and then withdrawing his resignation as a councillor. He described his previous decision to move to the Conservatives as "rash" and said he was "more politically aligned to Putting Cumbria First".

Davies stood as a CumbriaFirst candidate for Penrith and the Border in the 2019 General Election, ultimately coming last with 2.2% of the vote.

In February 2025, Davies contested a by-election in Eamont and Shap ward on Westmorland and Furness Council. He received 6.5% of the vote and was not elected.
