= Allerdale =

Former non-metropolitan district in England

Coordinates: 54.640°N 3.412°W

Borough of Allerdale
- Borough
- Coat of arms

- Shown within Cumbria
- Sovereign state: United Kingdom
- Constituent country: England
- Region: North West England
- Ceremonial county: Cumbria
- Historic county: Cumberland
- Founded: 1 April 1974
- Abolished: 31 March 2023
- Admin. HQ: Allerdale House, New Bridge Road, Workington, CA14 3YJ

Government
  - Type: Borough Council
  - Leadership: Leader & Cabinet

Area
  - Total: 479.60 sq mi (1,242.15 km^{2})

Population (2021)
  - Total: 96,384
  - Density: 200.97/sq mi (77.594/km^{2})
- Time zone: UTC+0 (Greenwich Mean Time)
  - Summer (DST): UTC+1 (British Summer Time)
- ONS code: 16UB (ONS) E07000026 (GSS)
- Ethnicity: 99.4% White British
- Website: www.allerdale.gov.uk

Allerdale was a non-metropolitan district of Cumbria, England, with borough status. Its council – Allerdale Borough Council – was based in Workington, and the borough had a population of 96,422 at the 2011 census.

The District of Allerdale was formed under the Local Government Act 1972, on 1 April 1974 by the merger of the municipal borough of Workington, the urban districts of Maryport, Cockermouth and Keswick; and the rural districts of Cockermouth and Wigton, all of which were within the administrative county of Cumberland. In 1995 Allerdale was granted borough status.

The name derives from the ancient region of Allerdale, represented latterly by the two wards of Cumberland, called Allerdale-above-Derwent and Allerdale-below-Derwent, the present borough corresponding largely to the latter with parts of the former. Much of the area during the medieval period was a royal forest subject to forest law.

In July 2021 the Ministry of Housing, Communities and Local Government announced that in April 2023, Cumbria would be reorganised into two unitary authorities. On 1 April 2023, Allerdale Borough Council was abolished and its functions transferred to the new unitary authority known as Cumberland, which also covers the former districts of Carlisle and Copeland.

== Settlements ==
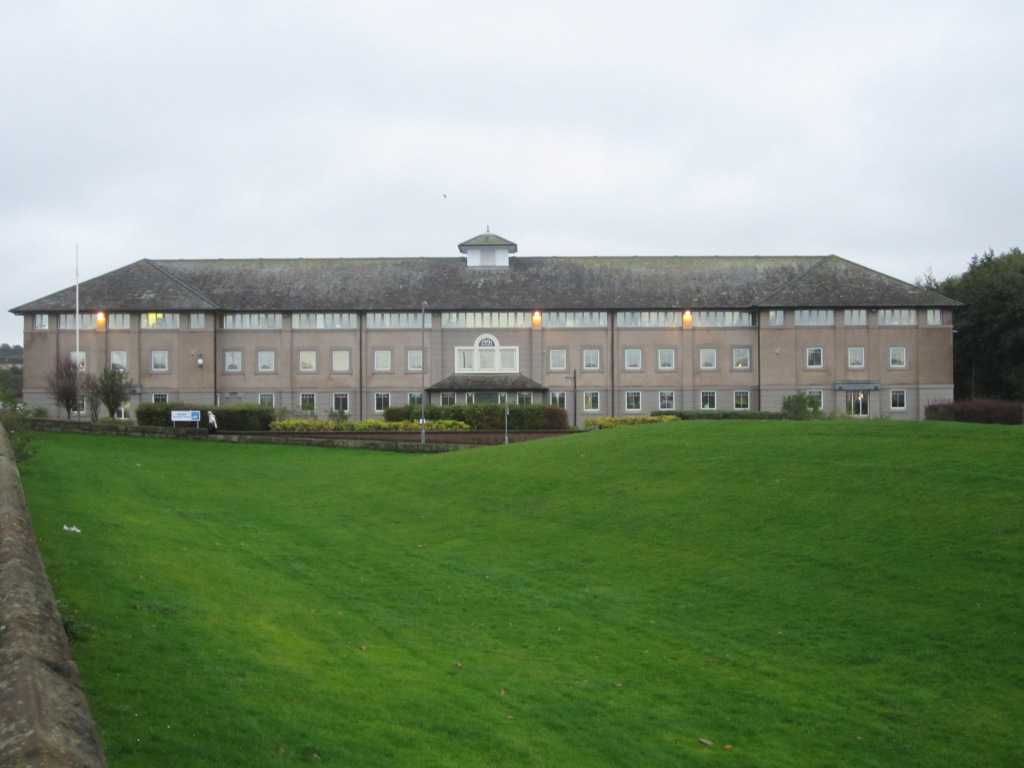
Allerdale House, the council's headquarters.

Workington was the largest settlement in the borough, and was the seat of the borough council. Allerdale House in Workington was the meeting place and primary office space used by the council. The building is known locally as "Perry's Palace" after former council chief executive Tony Perry, who was responsible for its construction. Other settlements in the borough included: Abbeytown, Allonby, Aspatria, Bolton Low Houses, Bothel, Brigham, Broughton, Great Clifton, Cockermouth, Crosby, Dean, Dearham, Fletchertown, Flimby, Ireby, Keswick, Kirkbride, Maryport, Mawbray, Plumbland, Seaton, Silloth, Tallentire, Thursby, Waverton, Westnewton, and Wigton.

== Freedom of the Borough ==
The following people and military units have received the Freedom of the Borough of Allerdale.

=== Individuals ===
- Malcolm Wilson: 28 March 2018.
- Ben Stokes: 25 September 2019.

== Politics ==
Elections to the borough council were held every four years with 49 councillors being elected from 23 wards. No party had a majority on the council since Labour lost their majority at the 2003 election. From the 2019 election until abolition in 2023, the council was jointly administered by the Conservative Party and independents. From March 2021 to March 2023 the leader of the council was Mark Johnson, a Conservative.

== Derwent 7 parishes ==
The Derwent 7 Community Led Planning Group was set up in 2007 by the town and parish councils of Above Derwent, Bassenthwaite, Borrowdale, Keswick, St John's, Castlerigg and Wythburn, Threlkeld and Underskiddaw, with funding from Allerdale Borough Council, and was still in existence in 2017. It had four subgroups including one on transport, and a co-ordinating "Cluster group".

The term "Derwent Seven Parishes" is used in defining the collecting scope of Keswick Museum, as Keswick is at the heart of the area covered by these parishes.

A map illustrating the area of the parishes is included in an appendix to a document produced by Sustainable Keswick.

== Map ==
Places in Allerdale
