= List of schools in Cumberland =

This is a list of schools in Cumberland, a unitary authority in England.

== State-funded schools ==
=== Primary schools ===
- All Saints' CE School, Cockermouth
- Allonby Primary School, Allonby
- Arlecdon Primary School, Arlecdon
- Ashfield Infant School, Workington
- Ashfield Junior School, Workington
- Bassenthwaite Primary School, Bassenthwaite
- Beckermet CE School, Beckermet
- Beckstone Primary School, Harrington
- Belle Vue Primary School, Carlisle
- Bewcastle School, Bewcastle
- The Bishop Harvey Goodwin CE School, Currock
- Black Combe Junior School, Millom
- Blackford CE Primary School, Blackford
- Blennerhasset School, Blennerhasset
- Boltons CE School, Bolton Low Houses
- Bookwell Primary School, Egremont
- Borrowdale CE Primary School, Borrowdale
- Bowness-on-Solway Primary School, Bowness-on-Solway
- Braithwaite CE Primary School, Braithwaite
- Brampton Primary School, Brampton
- Bransty Primary School, Bransty
- Bridekirk Dovenby CE Primary School, Dovenby
- Brook Street Primary School, Carlisle
- Broughton Moor Primary School, Broughton Moor
- Broughton Primary School, Great Broughton
- Burgh by Sands School, Burgh by Sands
- Caldew Lea School, Carlisle
- Captain Shaw's CE School, Bootle
- Castle Carrock School, Castle Carrock
- Crosby-on-Eden CE School, Crosby-on-Eden
- Crosscanonby St John's CE School, Crosscanonby
- Cummersdale School, Cummersdale
- Cumwhinton School, Cumwhinton
- Dean CE School, Dean
- Dearham Primary School, Dearham
- Derwent Vale Primary School, Great Clifton
- Distington Community School, Distington
- Eaglesfield Paddle CE Primary Academy, Eaglesfield
- Ellenborough Academy, Ellenborough
- Ennerdale and Kinniside CE Primary School, Ennerdale Bridge
- Ewanrigg Junior School, Ewanrigg
- Fairfield Primary School, Cockermouth
- Fellview Primary School, Caldbeck
- Fir Ends Primary School, Smithfield
- Flimby Primary School, Flimby
- Frizington Community Primary School, Frizington
- Gilsland CE Primary School, Gilsland
- Gosforth CE Primary School, Gosforth
- Grasslot Infant School, Maryport
- Great Corby Primary School, Great Corby
- Great Orton Primary School, Great Orton
- Hallbankgate Village School, Hallbankgate
- Haverigg Primary School, Haverigg
- Hayton CE Primary School, Hayton
- Hensingham Primary School, Hensingham
- Holm Cultram Abbey CE School, Abbeytown
- Holme St Cuthbert School, Holme St Cuthbert
- Houghton CE School, Houghton
- Inglewood Infant School, Carlisle
- Inglewood Junior School, Carlisle
- Ireby CE School, Ireby
- Irthington Village School, Irthington
- Jerchio Primary School, Whitehaven
- Kells Infant School, Kells
- Kingmoor Infant School, Carlisle
- Kingmoor Junior School, Carlisle
- Kirkbampton CE School, Kirkbampton
- Kirkbride Primary School, Kirkbride
- Kirkland CE Academy, Kirkland
- Lanercost CE Primary School, Lanercost
- Longtown Primary School, Longtown
- Lorton School, High Lorton
- Lowca Community School, Lowca
- Maryport CE Primary School, Maryport
- Millom Infant School, Millom
- Monkwray Junior School, Whithaven
- Montreal CE Primary School, Cleator Moor
- Moor Row Community Primary School, Moor Row
- Moresby Primary School, Moresby
- Netherton Infant School, Maryport
- Newlaithes Infant School, Carlisle
- Newlaithes Junior School, Carlisle
- Newtown Primary School, Carlisle
- Norman Street Primary School, Carlisle
- Northside Primary School, Workington
- Orgill Primary School, Egremont
- Oughterside Primary School, Oughterside
- Our Lady and St Patrick's RC Primary School, Maryport
- Pennine Way Primary School, Carlisle
- Petteril Bank School, Carlisle
- Plumbland CE School, Parsonby
- Raughton Head CE School, Raughton Head
- Richmond Hill School, Aspatria
- Robert Ferguson Primary School, Denton Holme
- Rockcliffe CE School, Rockcliffe
- Rosley CE School, Rosley
- St Bede's RC Primary School, Carlisle
- St Bees Village Primary School, St Bees
- St Bega's CE Primary School, Eskdale Green
- St Begh's RC Junior School, Whitehaven
- St Bridget's CE School, Brigham
- St Bridget's CE School, Parton
- St Bridget's RC Primary School, Egremont
- St Cuthbert's RC Primary School, Botcherby
- St Cuthbert's RC Primary School, Wigton
- St Gregory and St Patrick's RC Infant School, Corkickle
- St Gregory's RC Primary School, Westfield
- St Herbert's CE Primary and Nursery School, Keswick
- St James' CE Infant School, Whitehaven
- St James' CE Junior School, Whitehaven
- St James' RC Primary School, Millom
- St Joseph's RC Primary School, Frizington
- St Margaret Mary RC Primary School, Carlisle
- St Mary's RC Primary School, Kells
- St Mary's RC Primary School, Salterbeck
- St Matthew's CE School, Westnewton
- St Michael's CE Primary School, Bothel
- St Michael's CE Primary School, Dalston
- St Michael's Infant School, Workington
- St Patrick's RC Primary School, Cleator Moor
- St Patrick's RC Primary School, Workington
- Scotby CE Primary School, Scotby
- Seascale Primary School, Seascale
- Seaton Academy, Seaton
- Seaton St Paul's CE Junior School, Seaton
- Shankhill CE Primary School, Hethersgill
- Silloth Primary School, Silloth
- Stanwix School, Stanwix
- Stoneraise School, Durdar
- Thomlinson Junior School, Wigton
- Thornhill Primary School, Thornhill
- Thursby Primary School, Thursby
- Thwaites School, Hallthwaites
- Upperby Primary School, Upperby
- Valley Primary School and Nursery, Whitehaven
- Victoria Infant School, Workington
- Victoria Junior School, Workington
- Waberthwaite CE School, Waberthwaite
- Walton & Lees Hill CE School, Brampton
- Warwick Bridge Primary School, Warwick Bridge
- Westfield Nursery and Primary School, Westfield
- Wiggonby CE School, Wiggonby
- Wigton Infant School, Wigton
- Wreay CE Primary School, Wreay
- Yewdale School, Carlisle

=== Secondary schools ===
- Beacon Hill Community School, Aspatria
- Caldew School, Dalston
- Cockermouth School, Cockermouth
- Energy Coast UTC, Workington
- Keswick School, Keswick
- Millom School, Millom
- The Nelson Thomlinson School, Wigton
- Netherhall School, Maryport
- Richard Rose Central Academy, Carlisle
- Richard Rose Morton Academy, Carlisle
- St Benedict's Catholic High School, Hensingham
- St John Henry Newman Catholic School, Carlisle
- St Joseph's Catholic High School, Workington
- Solway Community School, Silloth
- Trinity School, Carlisle
- West Lakes Academy, Egremont
- The Whitehaven Academy, Whitehaven
- William Howard School, Brampton
- Workington Academy, Workington

=== Special and alternative schools ===
- Cumbria Academy for Autism, Workington
- Gillford Centre, Carlisle
- James Rennie School, Carlisle
- Mayfield School, Whitehaven
- West Cumbria Learning Centre, Distington

=== Further education ===
- Carlisle College, Carlisle
- Lakes College, Workington

== Independent schools ==
=== Senior and all-through schools ===
- Austin Friars, Carlisle
- Lime House School, Dalston
- St Bees School, St Bees

=== Special and alternative schools ===
- Kirby Moor School, Brampton
- Progress Schools, Carlisle
