= History of Workington =

Workington was historically a part of Cumberland now Cumbria, an historic county in North West England; the area around Workington has long been a producer of coal, steel and high-grade iron ore.

== Roman times (AD 79–410) ==
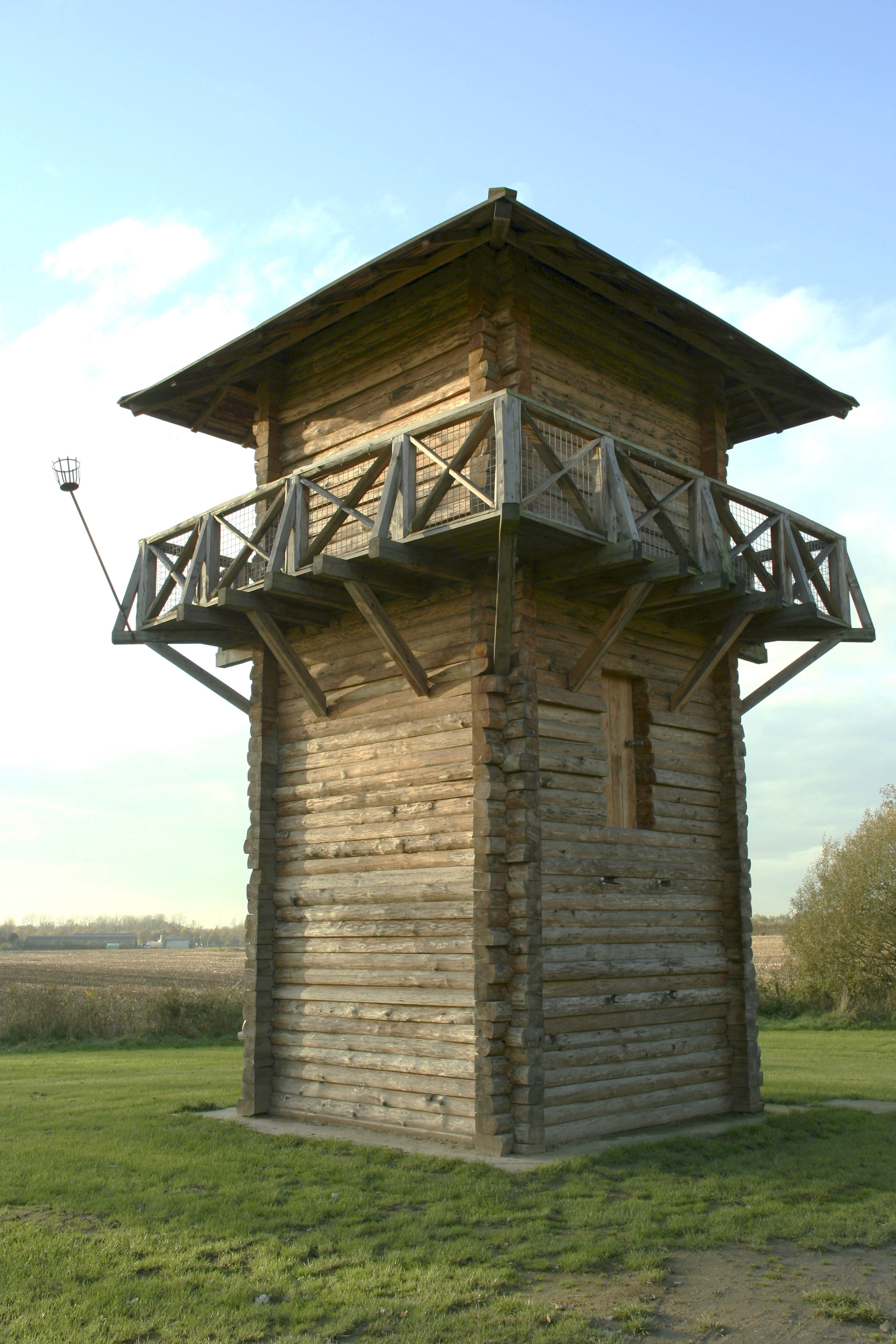
Reconstruction of a Roman watchtower.

Between 79 and 122, Roman forts, mile-forts and watchtowers were established down the Cumbrian coast. They acted as coastal defences against attacks by the Scoti in Ireland and by the Caledonii, the most powerful tribe in what we now call Scotland. The 16th century book, Britannia, written by William Camden describes ruins of the coastal defences at Workington.

The fort, now known as Burrows Walls, was established on the north bank of the mouth of the River Derwent, near present-day Siddick Pond and Northside. Another fort or watchtower would have been on How Michael to the south side of the river, near present-day Chapel Bank. In 122, the Romans begin building Hadrian's Wall from Bowness on the Solway Firth to Wallsend on the North Sea. The discovery of a Roman fort around the parish church in Moresby to the south, and fortifications to the north at Risehow (Flimby), Maryport and Crosscannonby support the argument that the coastal wall extended down the whole Solway coast and formed a key part of the empire's defences.

For many years Burrow Walls was believed to be the fort Gabrosentum or Gabrocentio, found in The Notitia Dignitatum for Britain, which lists several military commands (the Dux Britanniarum, the Count of the Saxon Shore (Comes Litoris Saxonici per Britannias) and the Comes Britanniarum). The word Gabrocentum has its origins in the Welsh or Ancient British gafr meaning "he goat" and the word hynt (set in Old Irish) meaning "path". Today, many scholars believe it is more likely to be the fort known as Magis.

== Middle Ages ==
=== Anglo-Saxon ===
The name Workington, is believed to be derived from three Anglo-Saxon words; Weorc (most probably a man's name), the suffix -ingas (the sons or people of ...) and tūn (settlement/estate/enclosure). The settlers were a group of people whose leader called himself Weorc. Over 1000 years ago, the original inhabitants of the land would have called themselves Weorcingas (Weorc's people) and the settlement Weorcinga tun (estate of the Weorcingas). Over a period of almost 1000 years, the town's name has been written in at least 105 ways:

In 1533, John Leland) believed the town derived its name from the River Wyre. But the River Wyre has its origins at Ellerbeck, Hunday and Distington and actually enters the Solway at Harrington. In 1688, William Camden quotes Leland, writing that the Wyre "…falls into the Derwent at Clifton…".

It is believed that there was a religious community of monks, with links to Lindisfarne, living and working where St Michael's Church stands today. At that time, higher sea levels would mean the community may have lived on an island south of the river's mouth. The Lindisfarne monks attempted to cross the Solway Firth to Ireland in a boat, but a strong storm blew up and the Lindisfarne Gospels were lost overboard. The monks were forced back to shore. Tradition says that the Gospels, which were probably inside a wooden box, were discovered water-stained but safe in the sea near Candida Casa on the Isle of Whithorn.

=== The Vikings ===
A Viking sword was discovered at Northside, which is belied to indicate that there was a settlement on the river mouth. The sword is thought to be part of a burial, in an area which has subsequently been shown to be rich in evidence of Viking period activity.

=== The Curwens ===
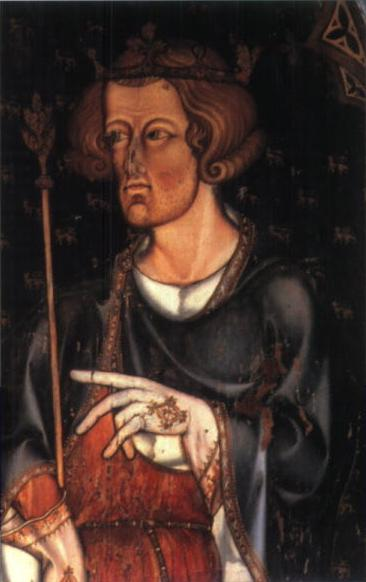
King Edward 'Longshanks' ordered ships and fighters from Workington

The Curwens, who were Lords of the Manor of Workington, were heavily involved in the First War of Scottish Independence. The Curwen family motto, "Si je n'estoy" ("If I had not been there"), is said to come from the words of Sir Gilbert (ii) de Curwen, whose late arrival with fresh troops recruited from his estates turned the course of the Battle of Falkirk (1298), giving King Edward victory. It has been suggested that Gilbert waited until he knew who looked like winning before joining battle, because he had family supporting both sides in the conflict. It was at this battle that William Wallace was defeated and subsequently executed. In 1306 Robert the Bruce was crowned King Robert I of Scotland. In 1307, The Calendar of Patent Rolls of King Edward I of England records his preparing for war against Robert the Bruce. He requests lords of the manor to provide ships, barges and 'find them in men and necessaries' to continue the war. It read:

...to get ready empty ships and barges at Skymburneys, Whitothavene and Wyrkinton, and elsewhere by the shore in that county, and find them in men and necessaries to go to the parts of Are to repress the malice of Robert de Brus and his accomplices. Writ de intendendo in pursuance to the men of that county...Appointment of John du Luda, as captain and governor of the fleet from the port of Skynburnesse, Whitothavene and Wyrkinton...

The Curwens were again expected to provide support and troops to fight in the Second War of Scottish Independence.

Sir Gilbert (iii) de Curwen (c. 1296 – 1370), received his knighthood on the battlefield at Crecy in 1346. He and his men fought alongside King Edward III of England as he attempted to seize the French throne after the death of Charles IV. In 1379, Sir Gilbert (iv) de Curwen (died c. 1403) received a licence to fortify and crenellate the pele tower built by his father in Workington in 1362. Sir Gilbert is believed to have died in 1403 during the great pestilence (plague), which also killed his first son, Sir William (i), who inherited his title. The Black Death is estimated to have killed 30% to 60% of Europe's population, reducing the world's population from an estimated 450 million to between 350 and 375 million by 1400. This has been seen the cause of a series of religious, social and economic upheavals which profoundly affected the course of European history.

Curwen tradition believes that at least one member of the family fought with Henry V at the Battle of Agincourt in 1415. The roll mentions a John Werkyngton. This very unusual spelling matches with '...the manor of Werkyngton, co. Cumberland...' written in King Henry's Patent Rolls in 1405. John may have been a younger Curwen son, a cousin or a man of standing from the community. The names of the thousands of archers and ordinary private soldiers are not on the roll.

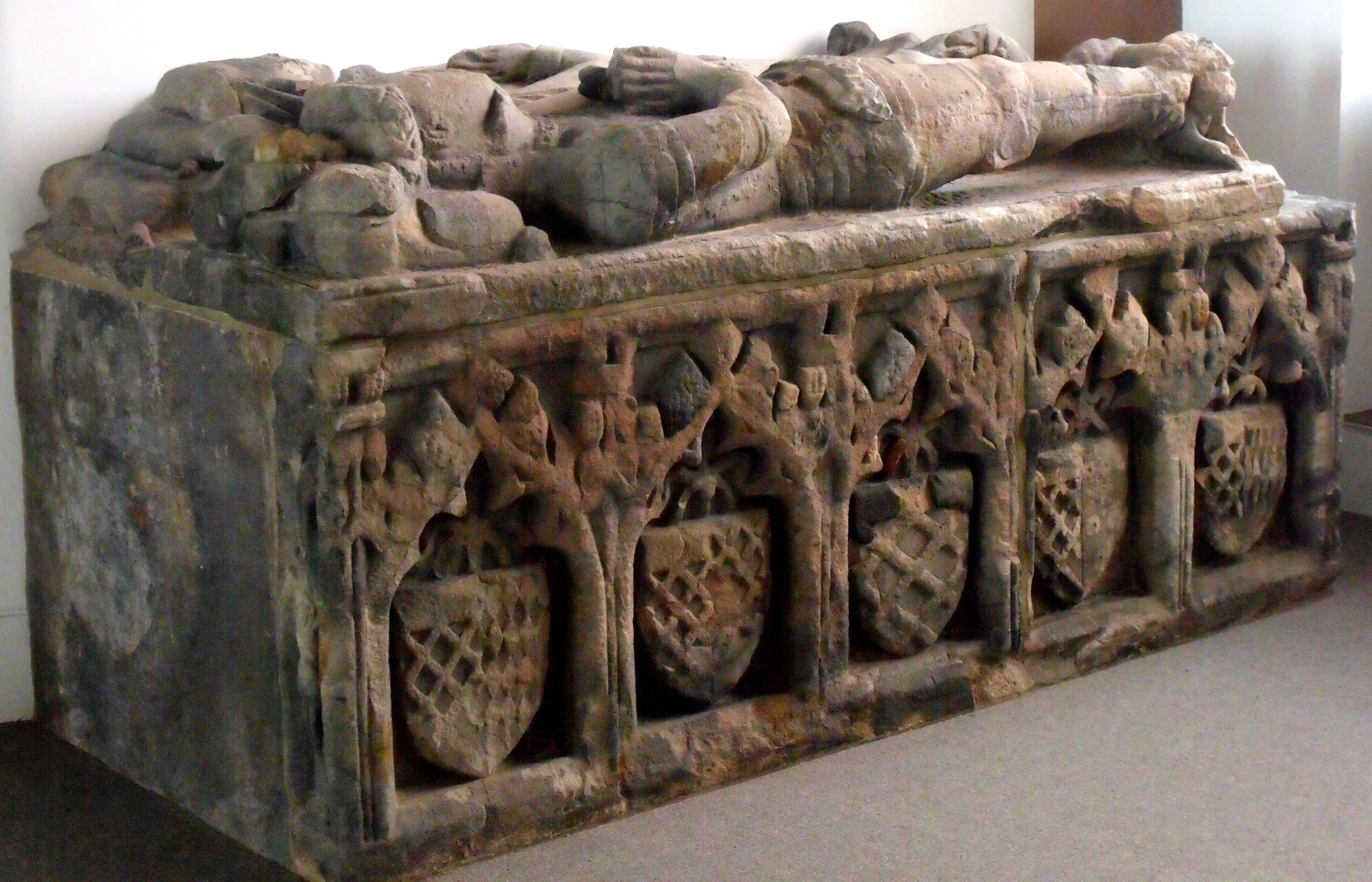
Sir Christopher (i) Curwen and his wife Elizabeth lie side by side in St Michael's Church, Workington

In 1428, Henry VI of England, granted Sir Christopher (ii) de Curwen (1382–1453), the Castle and land of Cany and Canyell in Normandy, France as a reward for "good service". In 1429, he returned to northern England to fight an invasion by the Scots. In 1442, he oversaw the truce between Henry VI of England and King James II of Scotland. The lands in Normandy were lost to the French in 1450. Sir Christopher and his wife, Elizabeth Huddleston, are buried inside St Michael's Church, under a heavily carved tombstone bearing their effigies.

Sir Thomas (iv) Curwen (c. 1494 – 1543) married Agnes, daughter of Sir Walter Strickland and great-granddaughter of Anne Parr. The royal blood of the Plantagenets came to the Curwen house.. according to the book Papers and Pedigrees by William Jackson (1892).

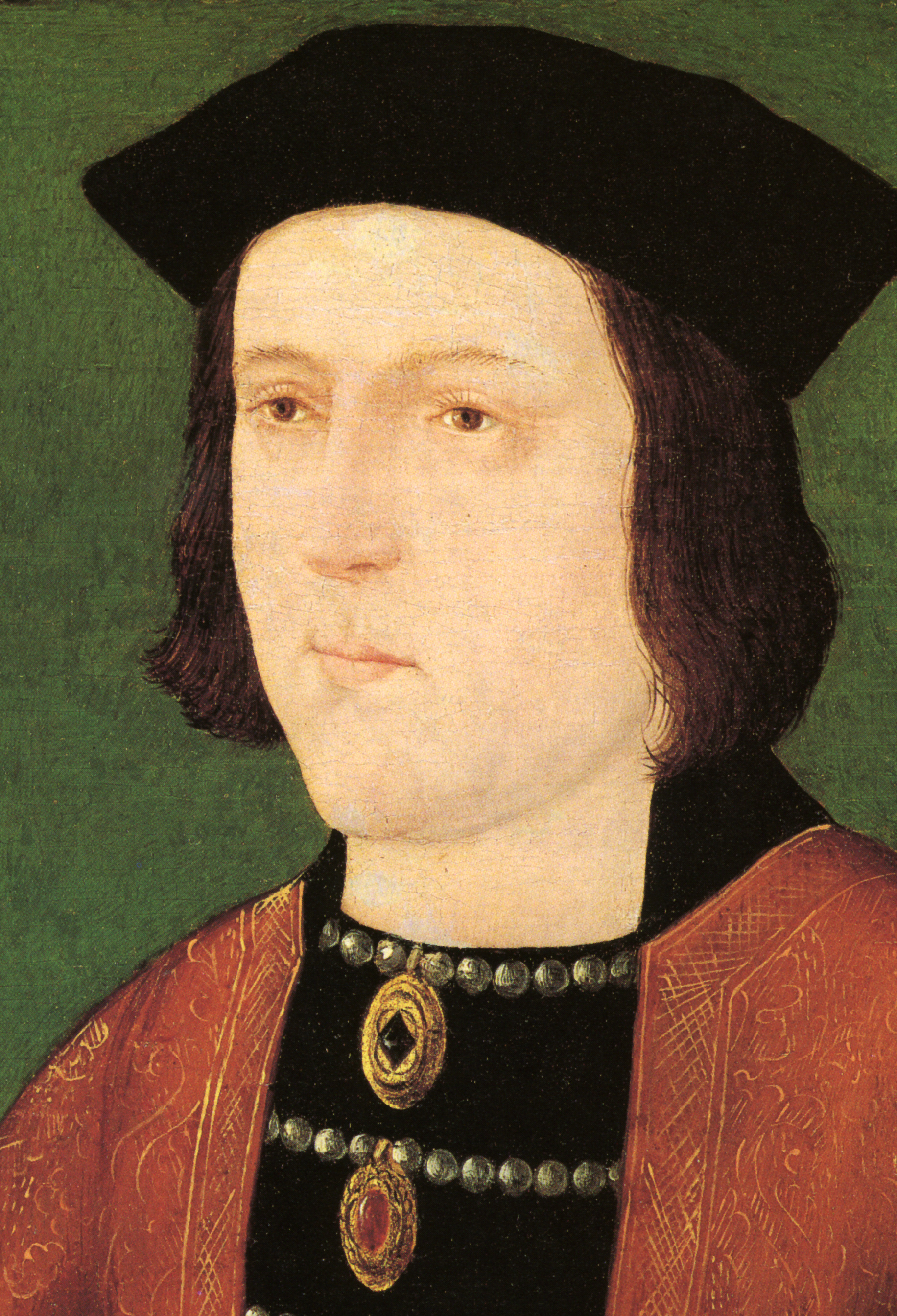
Edward IV granted honours to the Curwens for great and gratuitous service.

The Curwens appear to have provided material and physical support to both sides during the Wars of the Roses. Sir Thomas (ii) Curwen (c. 1420-c. 1473) was commissioned by King Henry VI to mobilise his forces to resist the rebellion of Richard, Duke of York at the beginning of the Wars. During the Wars the throne changed hands between the two houses and most able-bodied men, especially in the north of England, would have been forced into the conflict. King Edward IV of England of the House of York, later granted honours to the Curwen family, in acknowledgement of "great and gratuitous service". The war ended with the victory of the Lancastrians who founded the House of Tudor, which subsequently reigned over England and Wales for 118 years.

== Early modern era ==
=== Scottish pirates kill the crew of a Workington-bound ship ===
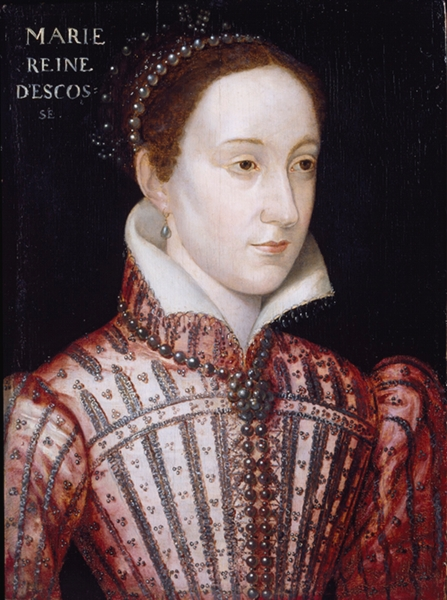
Mary, Queen of Scots, wrote to Queen Elizabeth from Workington

In 1566, Queen Elizabeth was encouraging mining of metal ores in the area around Keswick. It appears that the Samuel, a new ship built in Bristol, was employed to supply materials to and bring ore from the mines. Workington was growing, and a stretch of the shore was purchased to unload timber brought from Ireland to help smelt ore. England was extremely short of metals and weapons technology, and the ore was primarily to be used for cannon and other weaponry.

...the (ship) Samuel of Bristol...whereof one Edward Stone was master and partie owner, and put the same to the sea, fraighted with their goodes and merchandizes the 20th September last past to traffique with the same to a place called Wurkington in the North parties of our realm, near unto our citie of Carlisle, the said ship being in her way towardes the said place was dryven by force of weather and tempest to the coast of Scotland to a place called the Keyles', and there ryding at an ancre was boorded by certaine Scottishmen, who fayning themselfes to be merchants and cum onely to see what merchandizes was in the ship, most cruelly did murdre the said Master with all his companie except two that kept themselfes in secret places of their ship until the furye of thies murderers was asswaged, and so toke both ship and goods as their owne...

=== Mary, Queen of Scots, escapes to Workington (1568) ===
In 1568, Mary wrote a letter from Workington Hall to Queen Elizabeth I of England. After the defeat of her forces at the Battle of Langside and disguised as an ordinary woman, Mary, Queen of Scots, crossed the Solway Firth and landed at Workington. She spent her first night in England as an honoured guest at Workington Hall. On 18 May 1568, Mary was escorted to Carlisle Castle after spending a day at Cockermouth. She was 25 years old.

=== William Camden's Britannia (1586) ===
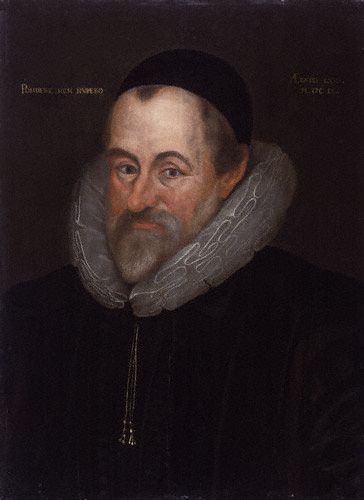
In 1586, William Camden described Wirkinton as 'a place famous for taking of Salmons'.

This extract from Philemon Holland's English translation of Britannia (1610) describes Wirkinton:

...Derwent, having gathered his waters into one streame, entreth into the Ocean at Wirkinton, a place famous for taking of Salmons, and now the seat of the ancient family of the Curwens Knights, who fetch their descent from Gospatric Earle of Northumberland, and their surname they tooke by covenant and composition from Culwen a family in Galloway, the heire whereof they had married; and heere have they a stately house built Castlelike, and from whom (without offence or vanity be it spoken) my selfe am descended by the mothers side.

== Since the eighteenth century ==
=== John Christian Curwen (1756–1828) ===
John Christian Curwen (1756–1828) Member of Parliament and leading social and agricultural reformer.

"The greatest strides in Curwen initiative occurred during the lordship of John Christian Curwen". Workington changed radically both economically and socially, during the period when John Christian was lord of the manor (1783–1828). A Curwen through his mother's side, it was said of him "he is the man who stands out...who must rank as one of the most interesting and progressive of Cumbrians of his day". He was Member of Parliament for Carlisle from 1796 to 1812 and from 1816 to 1820, following this with a period as member for Cumberland from 1820 to 1828. He made a national mark in his campaigns for reform of the Corn Laws and Agrarian Laws, and for Catholic emancipation especially the Roman Catholic Relief Act 1791 (31 Geo. 3. c. 32). His influence was such that he was offered peerages by both Addington and Castlereagh but he turned them down. His practical interest in agricultural reform can be traced in the proceedings of the Workington Agricultural Society, of which he was founder-president. Cumbrian archive records contain reports on Curwen's experimental farm at the Schoose, and on such other items as the estate he purchased between Windermere and Hawkshead, Lancashire, in order to encourage forestry. By planting over 800,000 trees around Windermere he transformed that area of the Lake District. An active supporter of the abolition of slavery, his friend and party activist William Wilberforce spent time with John Christian on Belle Isle.

To modern eyes, however, one of the most interesting of his projects was his introduction of social security and mutual benefit schemes for his farm and colliery workers.

== Education ==
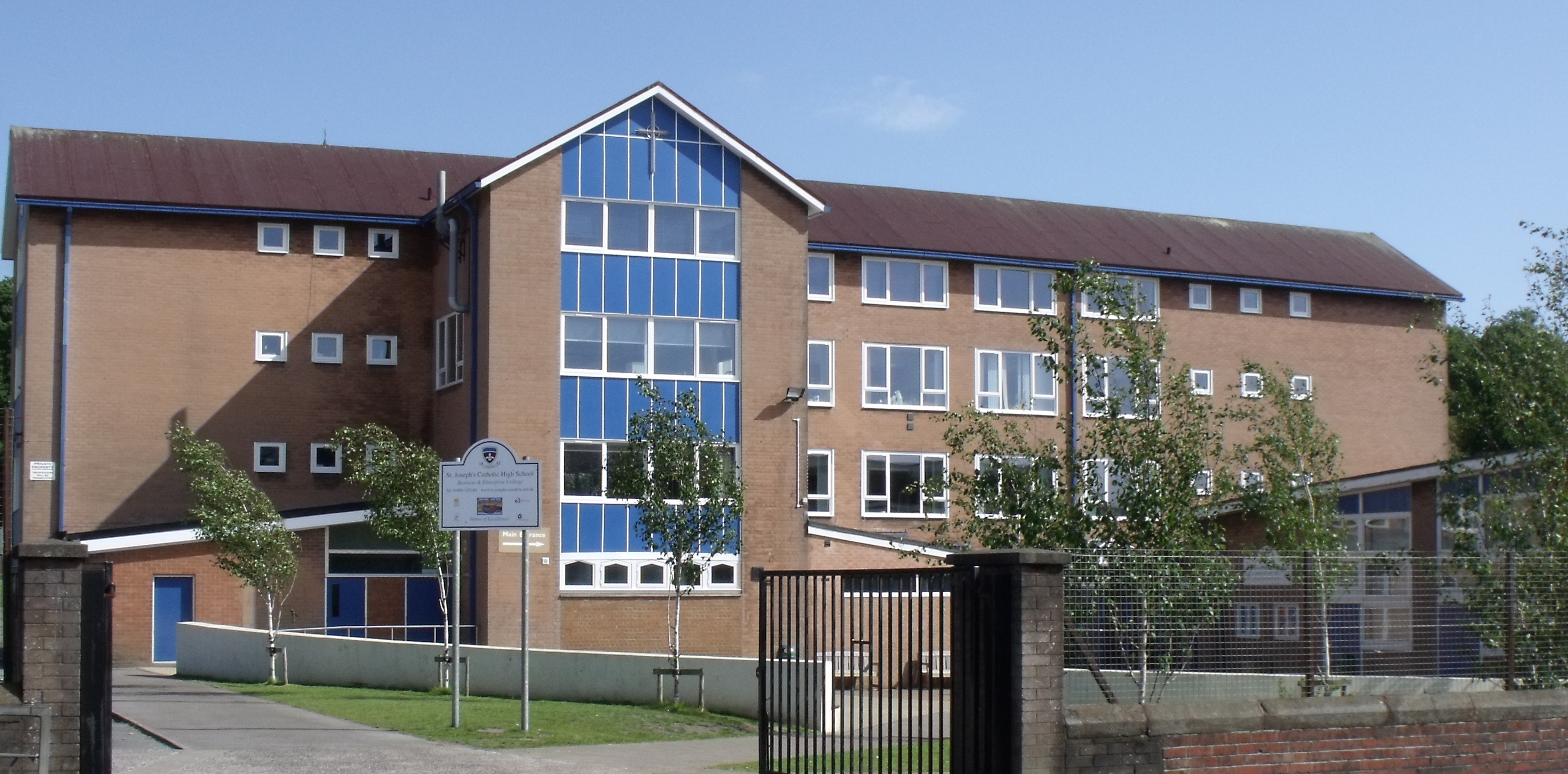
St Joseph Catholic High School on Harrington Road.

Educational institutions include:

- Patricius Curwen's school on the High Street (1664 – 1813), became the 'National' school in Portland Square (est. 1813),
- Wilson Charity School (1831 – 1967) on Guard Street which became the Higher Standard Council School (locally called 'Guard Street'),
- St John's School (1860 – present) on John Street,
- St Michael's School (1860 – present),
- Lawrence Street School (Marshside) (1874 – 1979),
- Victoria School,
- Northside School (1878 – present),
- Siddick School (1902 – 1967),
- Seaton School,
- Bridgefoot School,
- Westfield School,
- Moorclose School (1967 – 1984),
- Newlands School (1909 – 1984),
- Workington Grammar School (Workington County Technical and Secondary School) (1912 – 1984),
- Lillyhall School, Distington (1961 – 84),
- Distington School,
- St Joseph's Catholic High School (1929 – present),
- Derwent Vale School, Great Clifton,
- Ashfield School,
- Salterbeck School (1954–1984),
- Southfield School (1984–2015),
- Stainburn School (1984–2015),
- Workington Academy (2015–present),
- Beckstone Primary School, Harrington, Cumbria.
