= Salterbeck School =

School in Cumbria, England, 1954–1984

Salterbeck School was a school in Salterbeck, Workington, Cumbria, England.

The school opened in 1954. In 1984, there was a merger of a number of schools in the area.

The following schools either closed or changed name:

- Workington Grammar School closed in 1984, and became Stainburn School. Stainburn School is now known as Workington Academy since being merged with Southfield Technology College.
- Moorclose Boys School (which was on Needham Drive Workington) closed in 1984 and became Southfield Upper site. At this point in time (2013) the school is now the 6th Form Centre.
- Newlands School (which was on Newlands Lane Workington) closed in 1984 and was demolished in the late 1980s, and Newlands Nursing Home was built on the site.
- Lillyhall School (which was on Hallwood Road Lillyhall) closed in 1984 and was demolished in the 1990s. The site is now occupied by Lakes College.

Pupils from Lillyhall, Moorclose and Newlands School, either went to Southfield or Stainburn School.

In 1984, Salterbeck School changed its name to Southfield School and occupied two buildings, the old Salterbeck School (which was called Southfield Lower) and the old Moorclose Boys School (which was called Southfield Upper). Pupils had to walk between the lower and upper schools for various lessons until they reached their 4th year (reach the age of 14). At that point the pupils were permanently at the Southfield Upper School.

Southfield Upper closed permanently in July 2015 and its staff and pupils moved to Workington Academy at the Stainburn site which opened in October 2015 following the merger of Southfield and Stainburn Schools.
