= Southfield Technology College =

Location
- Moorclose Road; Workington, Cumbria, CA14 5BH; England
- Coordinates: 54.624528°N 3.555306°W

Information
- Former names: Southfield School
- Type: Community school
- Closed: 31 August 2015
- Local authority: Cumbria County Council
- Fate: Merged into Workington Academy

Southfield Technology College was a mixed secondary school in Workington, Cumbria. It was established in 1984 following the merger of Moorclose Boys School and Salterbeck School.

== Closure and merger ==
In 2014, following a failed inspection, the school was placed in special measures by Ofsted. It was decided that the school would close and merge with Stainburn School and Science College to form a new academy.

To support both schools ahead of the merger, an executive head teacher, Lorrayne Hughes, was appointed. It was also announced that William Howard School in Brampton would sponsor the new academy, which led to the creation of the William Howard Trust, a multi-academy trust, in September 2015.

The school officially closed in August 2015 at the end of the academic year and merged with Stainburn School and Science College to form Workington Academy. The new academy building opened in March 2017.

== Demolition ==
It was announced that the new school building would be located on the site of the former Stainburn School and Science College, with construction expected to be completed by 2017. The site of Southfield Technology College was demolished in 2016, following a series of vandalism incidents.
