= List of schools in Cumbria =

There is no county-wide local education authority in Cumbria, instead education services are provided by the two smaller unitary authorities of Cumberland and Westmorland and Furness:

- List of schools in Cumberland
- List of schools in Westmorland and Furness
