= Cumbria Education Trust =

- Established: 2015
- Type: Multi Academy Trust
- Location: Longtown Road, Brampton, Cumbria, CA8 1AR
- Key people: Lorrayne Hughes, Chief Executive
- Website: https://www.cumbriaeducationtrust.org/

Cumbria Education Trust (formerly William Howard Trust) is a multi-academy trust of primary and secondary academies throughout Cumbria. It was established in September 2015 to sponsor the new Workington Academy following the merger of Southfield Technology College and Stainburn School and Science College.

== Leadership ==
The Chief Executive is Lorrayne Hughes, who has led the organisation since its inception. Prior to this role, she was Headteacher of William Howard School in Carlisle. In recognition of her service to education, Hughes was awarded an OBE in the 2024 King's Birthday Honours.

== Academies ==
Cumbria Education Trust oversees the management of 12 primary academies and 5 secondary academies. Additionally, it operates the West Coast Sixth Form, a collaboration between The Whitehaven Academy and Workington Academy, with facilities spanning both sites.

=== Primary ===
- Caldew Lea Primary School, Carlisle (Joined 2019)
- Castle Carrock Primary School, Castle Carrock (Joined 2022)
- Castle Park School, Kendal (Joined 2025)
- Hensingham Primary School, Whitehaven (Joined 2019)
- Longtown Primary School, Longtown (Joined 2016)
- Newtown Primary School, Carlisle (Joined 2020)
- Northside Primary School, Workington (Joined 2020)
- Petteril Bank School, Carlisle (Joined 2022)
- Stramongate Primary School, Kendal (Joined 2025)
- Tebay Primary School, Tebay (Joined 2017)
- Yanwath Primary School, Penrith (Joined 2017)
- Yewdale Primary School, Carlisle (Joined 2015)

=== Secondary ===
- Kirkby Stephen Grammar School, Kirkby Stephen (Joined 2024)
- The Queen Katherine School, Kendal (Joined 2025)
- The Whitehaven Academy, Whitehaven (Joined 2018)
- William Howard School, Brampton (Joined 2015)
- Workington Academy, Workington (Joined 2015)
