= Workington Opera House =

Theatre in Workington, Cumbria, England

Coordinates: 54.6438°N 3.5443°W

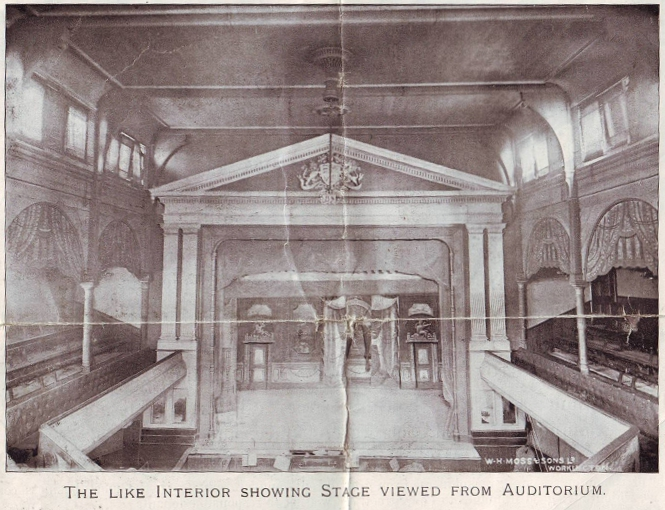
The Workington Opera House - Pre 1927.

The Workington Opera House, or The Opera as it was known, is a purpose built theatre located in Workington, Cumbria, England. Originally built as the Queen’s Jubilee Hall & Opera House it was gutted by fire in 1927 and rebuilt with a fine wide auditorium, and Ornamental ceiling with seating for 1200. The theatre has good sightlines and a large stage and currently sits empty after its former use as a bingo hall ended in 2004.

== History ==
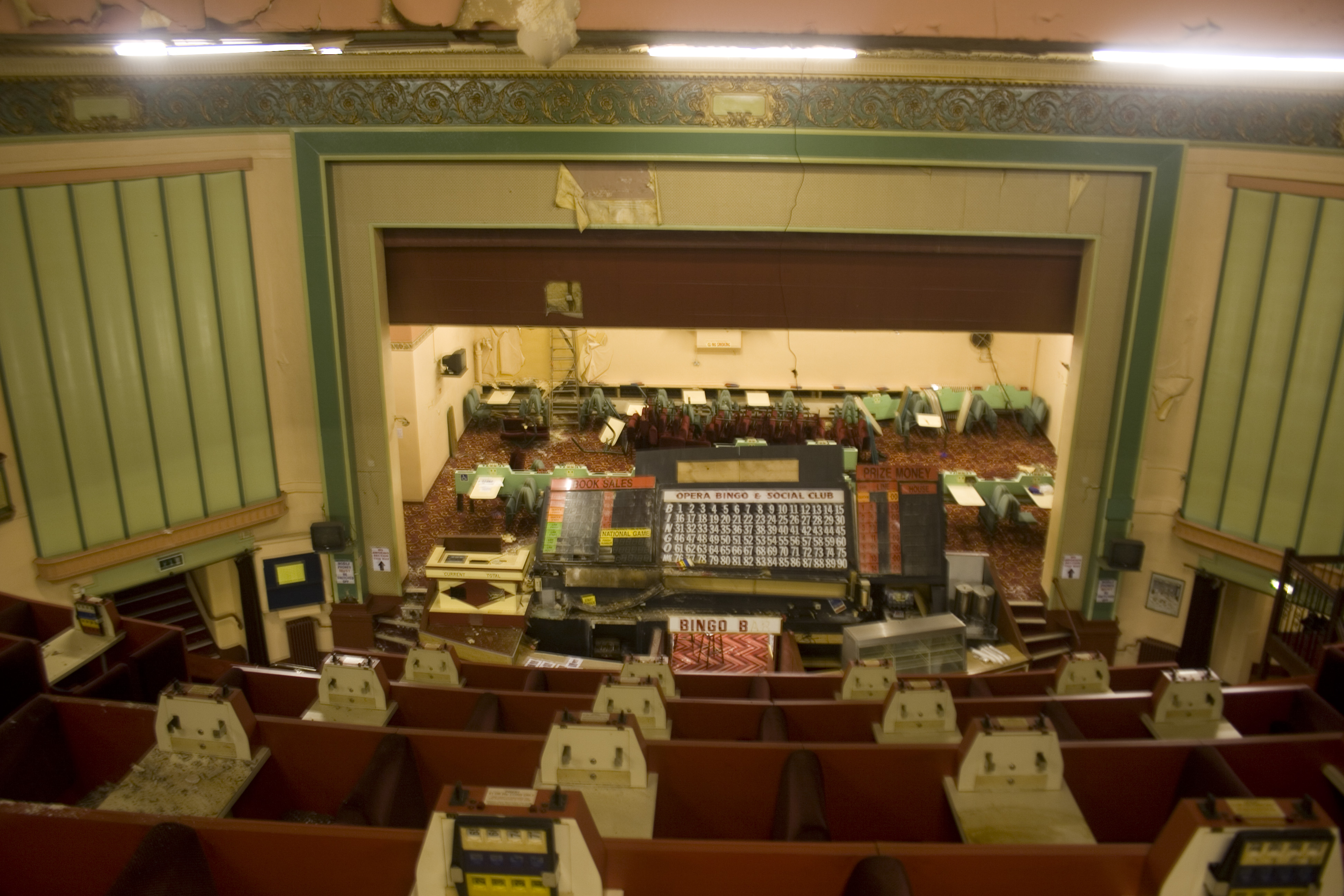
The Workington Opera House - 2010.

The theatre was designed by T. L. Banks & Townsend and had a small auditorium with two balconies accommodating 1,130 people. The theatre was also equipped with a small stage with a proscenium width of 11 metres, a depth of 9.14 metres and a grid height of 14 metres. An orchestra pit for 16 musicians was also included.

- Other names:
  - Queen's Jubilee Hall
- Dates:
  - Opened 1888. Date of first use not known.
  - 1888 - Design/Construction:
    - T.L. Banks & Townsend - Architect
  - 1897-1900 - Alteration: reconstructed after explosion (architect unknown)
  - 1927-1930 - Alteration: reconstructed after fire (architect unknown)
  - 1963-1970 - Alteration: façade rebuilt (architect unknown)

== Current owners ==
Graves (Cumberland) Ltd currently own the building and have planning permission for 5 years to replace the theatre with retail and residential units. Graves own many different assets across Cumbria including cinemas, bingo halls and in the past they owned and ran a number of theatres.

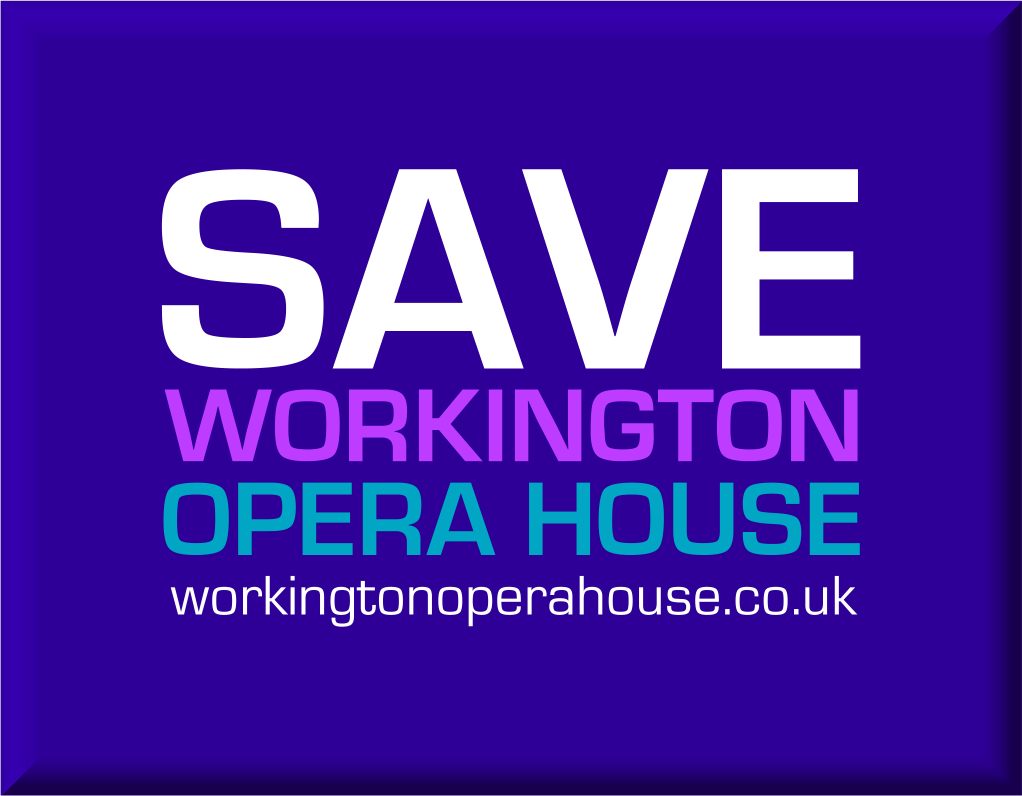
SAVE Workington Opera House logo.

== The future of the theatre ==
The Workington Opera House is now under threat of demolition to be replaced with retail units and flats. The Save Workington Opera House group are fighting to have this building made available to the town of Workington as a working civic theatre that the community can be proud of.

== Specifications ==
- Capacities:
  - Original: 1,330
  - After 1950: 1,219
- Listings:
  - Grade not listed
- Stage type:
  - Proscenium
- Dimensions
  - Stage dimensions:
    - Depth: 9.14m
    - Proscenium width: 11m
    - Height to grid: 14m
    - Orchestra pit: Original, for 16 musicians
