= Carnegie Theatre =

Theatre and arts centre in Cumbria, England

Coordinates: 54.644698°N 3.547978°W

The Carnegie Theatre
- Interactive map of The Carnegie Theatre
- Address: Finkle Street; Workington; England
- Operator: Carnegie Theatre Trust (Workington)
- Capacity: Approximately 330 (Theatre)
- Current use: Theatre and Arts Centre

Construction
- Opened: Thursday 6 October 1904

Listed Building – Grade II
- Official name: Carnegie Arts Centre and Theatre
- Designated: 13 December 1985
- Reference no.: 1327209
- Architects: Messrs Wittett and Mellon, York

Website
- www.carnegietheatre.co.uk

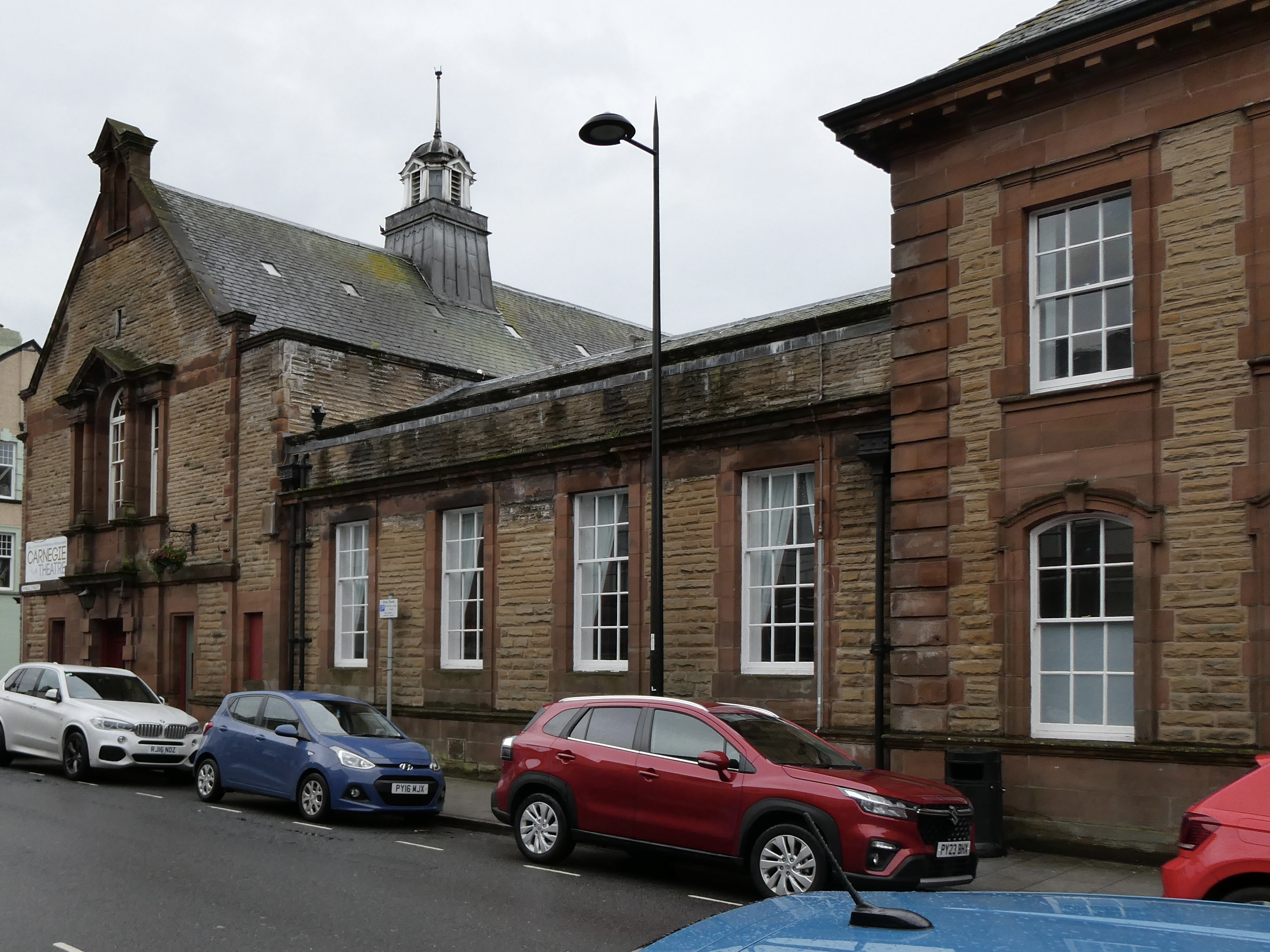
Carnegie Theatre alongside the Arts Centre Workington

The Carnegie Theatre, or The Carnegie, is a theatre and arts centre located in Workington, Cumbria, England. It occupies a Grade II listed building and is a registered charity (The Carnegie Theatre Trust).

The Foundation Stone for the 'Carnegie Free Library & Lecture Hall' was laid by his Worship The Mayor, Alderman R E Highton on Thursday 10 September 1903. The building opened on Thursday 6 October 1904 following a Carnegie library donation of £7,500 from Andrew Carnegie, the millionaire Ironmaster and Scottish/American Industrialist and philanthropist.

The lecture hall was used as a cinema from 1909 under a cinematograph license held by the librarian. The cinema was later let to Grave Cinemas Ltd. It was converted to a theatre after 1963.

Following that long tradition of a building for the people, to this day a regular programme of music and dance events is enjoyed by local people and tourists. Classes and courses are held in the Carnegie every week with a variety of events within the theatre and arts space, along with a cafe area open 6 days a week and spaces available for groups, workshops, business meetings and a wide range of other events.

== Carnegie Development Group ==
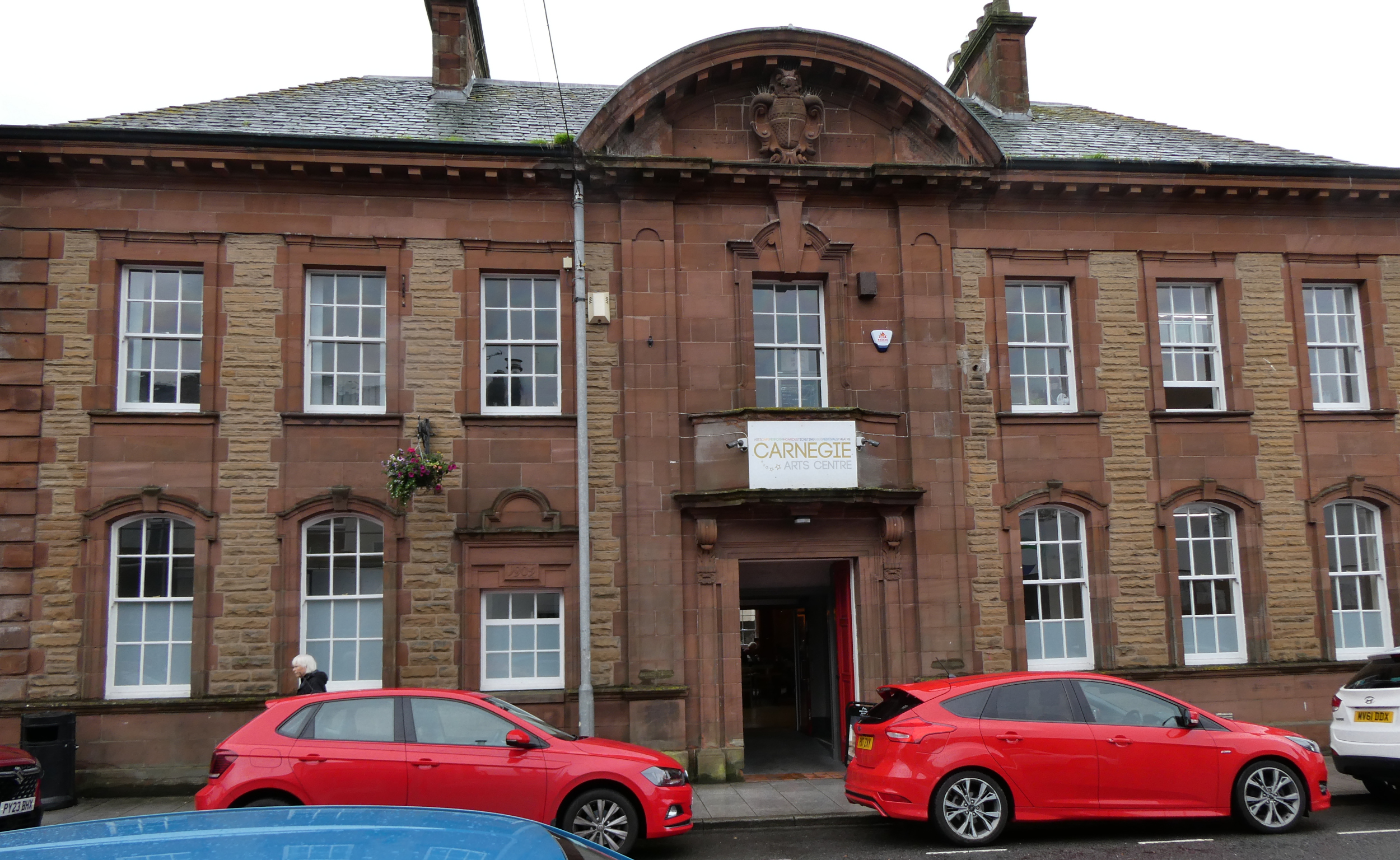
Front entrance to the Carnegie, Workington

Following a public meeting in 2011 the Carnegie Development Group was formed to support and secure a sustainable future for the Carnegie Theatre and Arts Centre as the prime venue for theatre, arts and culture in Workington and its surrounding districts. It later morphed into the "Friends of the Carnegie" group.

The aims and objectives of the Carnegie Development Group were to:

1. Provide support to secure a sustainable future for the Carnegie Theatre and Arts Centre as the prime venue for theatre, arts and culture in Workington and its surrounding districts.
2. To work jointly with other organisations in Workington in marketing and publicity for Theatre and the Arts.

The venue was taken over by the Carnegie Theatre Trust on the 1 May 2015 and is operated as a charity. It has a small number of paid staff that are managed by the board of directors (trustees).

Until January 2023, the chair of the trust was Lee Martin-White, with Barbara Cannon taking over chair after and up until present time (July 2025).
