= William Howard School =

Location
- Longtown Road; Brampton, Cumbria, CA8 1AR; England
- Coordinates: 54°56′38″N 2°44′33″W

Information
- Type: Secondary academy
- Motto: Be the best you can be!
- Local authority: Cumberland Council
- Trust: Cumbria Education Trust
- Department for Education URN: 137252 Tables
- Ofsted: Reports
- Headteacher: Kath Pigdon
- Gender: Coeducational
- Age: 11 to 18
- Enrolment: 1367
- Houses: Vindolanda, Talkin, Gelt, Eden
- Colour: Blue Yellow
- Website: www.williamhoward.cumbria.sch.uk

The William Howard School is a co-educational secondary academy school on Longtown Road (A6071) in Brampton, Carlisle, Cumbria, England for pupils aged 11–18.

== History ==
The school is named after Lord William Howard (1563–1640), who was the third son of Thomas Howard, 4th Duke of Norfolk. He married Elizabeth, the daughter and co-heiress of William, Lord Dacre, from whom the Naworth Castle branch of the Howard Family is descended. A Grade II monument of William Howard, 7th Earl of Carlisle, is positioned on one of the highest hills to one side of the town of Brampton, known as the Mote.

The school used to be known as the Irthing Valley Secondary Modern School, and was built between 1949 and 1953. It merged with another school in Brampton, the White House Grammar School situated on Main Street, in 1980 when comprehensive education replaced the selective education system. The ex-BBC newsreader Anna Ford was a head girl of White House Grammar School in 1961. More recently, the school had to be expanded after the closure of Lochinvar school in Longtown in 2008. A new performing arts block was built in 2010, allowing the old drama suite to be extensively refurbished to become the new sixth form centre, which was officially opened by Radio 1 DJ Greg James on 10 May 2011. The school used to have an outdoor swimming pool, but the block which is currently the sixth form centre was built on the site of the pool in the 1990s.

William Howard School was awarded Specialist Science status in 2004, Leading Edge status in 2005 and the International School Award in 2007. The school converted to become an academy in August 2011. It retained its own sixth form centre after some argument over a proposed merger with a larger Carlisle Sixth Form Centre.

In October 2014 it was announced that William Howard School will become the sponsor of the new Workington Academy in Workington in September 2015. The resulting multi-academy trust was called the Cumbrian Education Trust; it accepted responsibility for Whitehaven Academy and six primary schools.

== Tanzanian link ==
Founded in 1989, the William Howard School – Uru Secondary School link has been, and continues to be, a great asset to both the Uru and Brampton communities.

The rural village of Uru is located in the Moshi district of Kilimanjaro in northern Tanzania. About 8 miles from Moshi, the village itself is on the lower slopes of Mount Kilimanjaro. The Uru Secondary School is a co-ed church school with about 400 students in Forms 1 to 4. The Link was formed in 1987 when the coordinator, Phil Furneaux, met the Chair of Uru School Governors at an Energy Conference in Cumbria. At first WHS sent textbooks and other gifts to Uru. The first exchange took place in 1989 when a group of 13 students from WHS went to Uru. Since then there has been an exchange visit each way every other year except in 2002 when the visit was postponed due to a terrorist threat.

A few Uru students come to study in the sixth form at WHS on long term visits, and a number of WHS students go to teach English at Uru School during their gap years.

However, the school cut ties with Tanzania in 2023, the reason unknown to students. The school does however have a link with Taiwan, with Taiwanese students coming to the school and staying for at least a week at a time every few years and has planned to have trips to Taiwan in return for the students in the Cultural Ambassadors program.

== Sport ==
The school regularly competes at local level within Cumbria and has a history of schoolboy level FA Cup runs. Facilities include a fitness suite and also an astroturf pitch.

On the astroturf is run Carlisle and Brampton Six a Side League. There are currently 39 teams playing in five divisions. Fixtures are generally played on astroturf on Tuesdays and Friday nights. In the three Tuesday leagues the two lowest placed teams are relegated to the division below. The two highest placed teams are promoted. Teams play each other three times a season.

== theReview ==
theReview is a sixth form student newspaper that was relaunched after a two-year hiatus, in September 2012. The publication is completely and independently managed by students, all aged 16 to 17.

== Young Enterprise ==
The school has been a strong supporter of the Young Enterprise charity. It teaches young people about business through practical methods. Students have to set up their own company, create a product, and sell it. They also have to write a detailed report on the company, as well as set up two trade stands in Carlisle, and present their findings to a panel of judges.

== Notable alumni ==
- Anna Ford, newsreader and former BBC and ITV broadcaster
- Lucy Rose, writer and filmmaker
- Anna Nicholson, 2024 Bronze medal Paralympian.
