= Workington School =

Former school in Cumbria, England

Coordinates: 54.6429°N 3.5513°W

Workington County Technical and Secondary School was a secondary school in Workington, Cumbria, England, from 1912 to 1984.

It opened on 17 September 1912. At that time it was situated to the north of Vulcans Park, on the site now occupied by the hospital. The first principal was G.H. Woolatt Ph.D FIC., known as Dr. Woolatt. At the opening ceremony he spoke of his plan to divide the school into day secondary and trades departments. An advertisement in Nature in 1916 shows the school advertising for a principal assistant in the technical department, which comprised "(1) a Junior Technical School; (2) Day Apprentice Classes; (3) the usual Evening Classes".

The town was immensely proud of its school and for many years it was referred to as 'The College'.

The Education Act of 1944 meant that from 1945 two establishments co-existed on the same Park Lane site: the original college ("the Tech"); and the newly created Grammar School ("Workington Grammar School").

The opening of a totally new Grammar School building, at Stainburn in September 1954, meant development of the Workington Technical College could continue to take place on the original site.

Speaking on the occasion of the school's 50th anniversary, Grammar School headmaster, E.H. Mander said, 'The foundation of the school originally was an act of faith, faith in the value of education, faith in the future of the local area centred in Workington, faith in the capacity of sons and daughters of local families to justify the new opportunity for the acquiring of learning and practical skills, and above all faith in the supremacy and triumph of the good and the best in life.' The speech is recorded in The Wyrkentonian, the Grammar School's magazine, golden jubilee edition.

The National Archives holds the archives of Workington County Technical and Secondary School from 1921 to 1935 and of The Cumberland Technical College, described as "formerly part of Workington County Technical and Secondary School", from 1938 to 1945.
