= Unique Reference Number =

Identifier of UK schools

The Unique Reference Number (URN) is a six-digit number used by the UK government to identify educational establishments in the United Kingdom.

The URN is issued by the Office for Standards in Education, Children's Services and Skills (Ofsted) to identify the educational establishments they are responsible for monitoring. Initially this requirement applied to schools until Ofsted's brief was widened to include child care providers and nurseries. The more recent registration numbers for these early-years establishments are preceded by the prefix "EY" (early years). URNs for other educational establishments are issued by the Get Information About Schools (GIAS) website. It is possible for a GIAS-issued number to be the same as an Ofsted number for an unrelated school.

A further number, the United Kingdom Provider Number (UKPRN), is issued by the UK Register of Learning Providers. Registration with the site allows a school to share and update its information with organisations such as the Higher Education Funding Council for England, the Higher Education Statistics Agency, and the Skills Funding Agency, and is required to obtain certain types of government funding. Information on the site can also be accessed by members of the public.
