= Lakes College =

Coordinates: 54°36′22.0″N 3°31′54.5″W

Location
- Hallwood Road, Lillyhall Business Park; Workington, Cumbria, CA14 4JN; England

Information
- Type: Further Education
- Motto: Ready, Respectful, Potential
- Ofsted: Reports
- Principal: Chris Nattress
- Gender: Mixed
- Student Union/Association: Changemakers
- Website: http://www.lcwc.ac.uk/

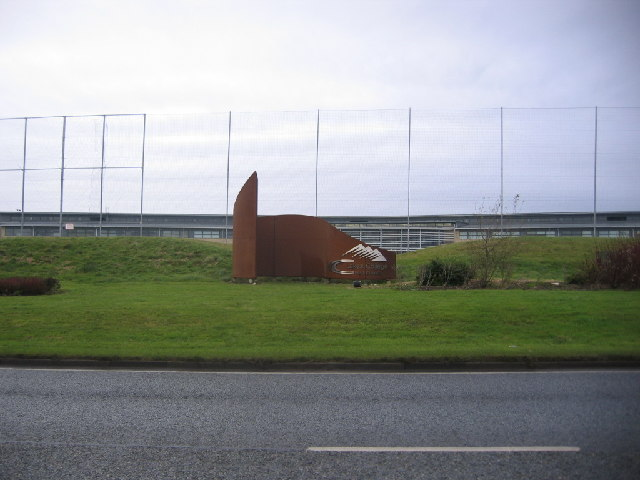
Lakes College

Lakes College is a further education institute located at Lillyhall, Cumberland, England, between the towns of Workington and Whitehaven.

The college offers courses to students from Allerdale, Copeland and the surrounding areas. These courses include NVQs, BTECs, Diplomas and Access courses, as well as HNCs, HNDs and Foundation Degrees.

The college is a sponsor of Energy Coast UTC in Workington.

In 2018 the northern hub of the National College for Nuclear was launched at the college, funded by £7.5 million from the Department for Education. The college is expected to service the building and operation of new build nuclear power plants, for example the nearby proposed Moorside Nuclear Power Station.

== History ==
Before moving to its current site the college was on the Park Lane, Workington, site occupied by Workington County Technical and Secondary School since 1912.

Workington College of Further Education and Whitehaven College of Further Education combined in 1969 to form West Cumberland College of Science and Technology, which in 1974 became West Cumbria College, which was renamed as The Lakes College when it moved to Lillyhall in 2001.
