= St Benedict's Catholic High School, Hensingham =

Comprehensive Secondary School in Whitehaven, Cumbria, UK

St Benedict's Catholic High School

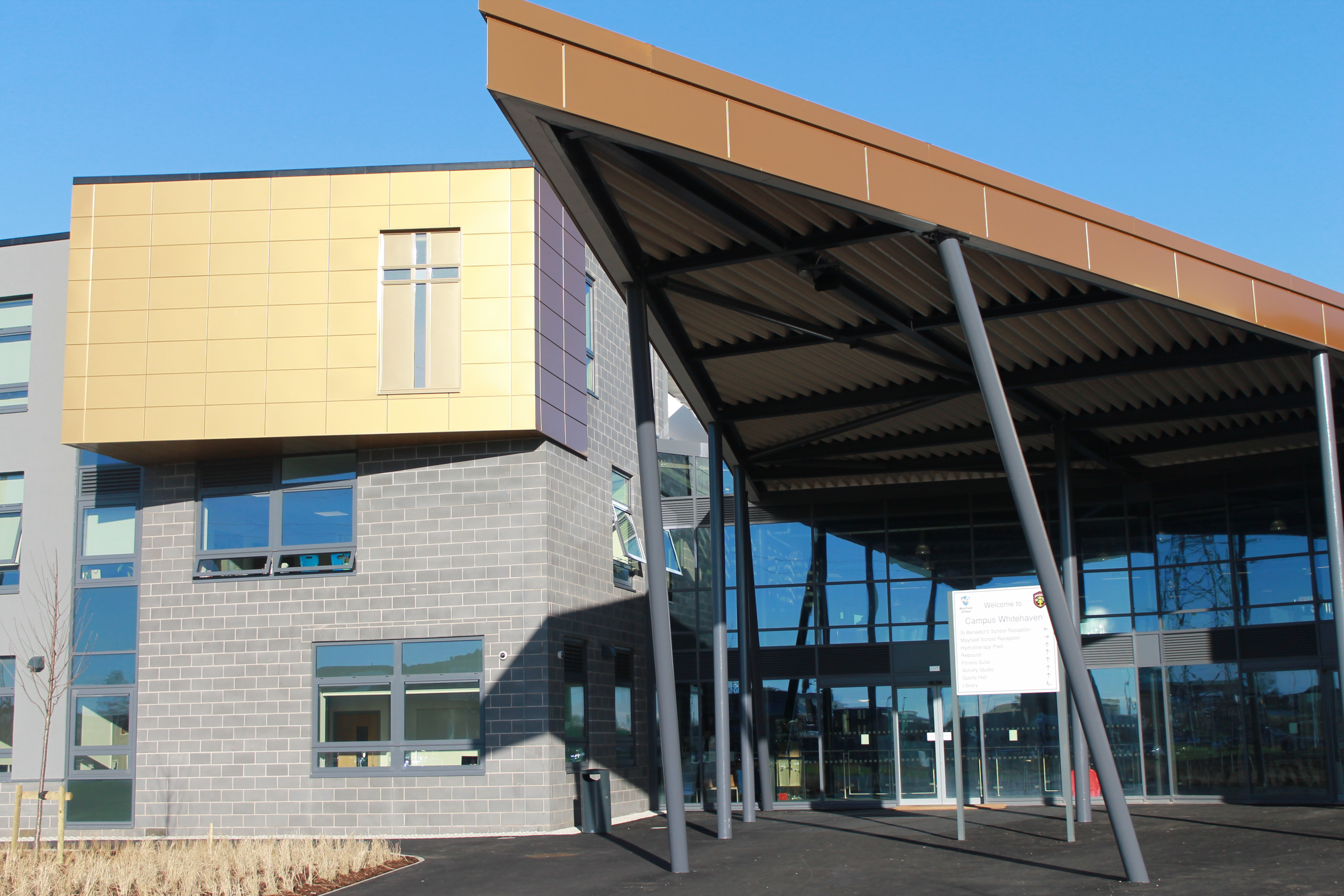

Location
- Campus Whitehaven, Red Lonning; Hensingham; Whitehaven, Cumbria, CA28 8UG; England
- Coordinates: 54.545223°N 3.557713°W

Information
- Type: Voluntary aided school
- Motto: "A Sense of Faith"
- Religious affiliation: Roman Catholic
- Established: 1971
- Local authority: Cumberland Council
- Department for Education URN: 112398 Tables
- Ofsted: Reports
- Headteacher: Emma Jackson
- Gender: Coeducational
- Age: 11 to 18
- Enrolment: ~1408
- Website: st-benedicts.cumbria.sch.uk

St Benedict's Catholic High School is a co-educational 11–18 comprehensive school on the edge of Whitehaven, Cumbria, England. It is located between the Western Lake District and the sea. St Benedict's is a larger than average Catholic high school, which serves a wide catchment area in West Cumbria. The proportion of students entitled to free school meals is just below average. The proportion of students with learning difficulties and/or disabilities is just above average, and an average number have a statement of special educational needs.

== History ==
The school was awarded specialist engineering college status in 2002. It has the Healthy Schools Award, and is a Fairtrade School. It became one of only ten schools nationally to achieve advanced status in study support and also achieved the International Schools Award.

In July 2018 staff balloted for strike action amid claims of a "toxic" atmosphere. An indicative ballot revealed 96 per cent of members, from a 92 per cent turnout, were in favour of striking. A survey carried out by the union revealed concerns were widespread among its 66 members. The concerns included a "toxic atmosphere" in the school, with worries over "a culture of fear and intimidation".

In January 2019 the school was co-located with Mayfield Special School as part of Campus Whitehaven, a £33m investment in the local area.

== Sports ==
On the school campus there are four tennis courts, an all-weather football pitch, a rugby pitch, a cricket pitch, a mile-long Cross country running track, and two indoor gymnasiums.

== West Cumbria Catholic Sixth Form Centre ==
St Benedict's has the region's only Catholic sixth form centre, West Cumbria Catholic Sixth Form Centre. Courses offered at the sixth form include sociology, history, philosophy and ethics, and the sciences. In the school's most recent inspection the Sixth Form achieved praise for its pastoral support and teaching standard due to achieving high pass rates, such as 100% pass rate in German studies. The Sixth form achieves a high percentage of students moving on to universities.

== Notable former pupils ==
- Kyle Amor, rugby league footballer, currently playing for St. Helens
- Thomas Docherty (politician), politician, former MP for Dunfermline and West Fife
- Dean Henderson, Crystal Palace goalkeeper
- Brad Kavanagh, actor and musician, known for his role in House of Anubis
