= Salterbeck =

Housing estate in Workington, Cumbria, England

Coordinates: 54.619°N 3.563°W

- Location in Allerdale, Cumbria Location within Cumbria
- OS grid reference: NX996279
- Unitary authority: Cumberland
- Ceremonial county: Cumbria
- Region: North West
- Country: England
- Sovereign state: United Kingdom
- Post town: WORKINGTON
- Postcode district: CA14
- Dialling code: 01946
- Police: Cumbria
- Fire: Cumbria
- Ambulance: North West
- UK Parliament: Whitehaven and Workington

Salterbeck is a housing estate on the south side of Workington, Cumbria, England, which was built during the 1930s on farmland for steelworkers and their families relocating to the area. Roughly 70% of the houses are now owned by Riverside Housing Association and the remainder are privately owned. Salterbeck is bordered by Westfield and Mossbay to the north and Harrington to the south.

== Governance ==
Whitehaven and Workington is in the parliamentary constituency of Salterbeck.

For Local Government purposes it is in the Cumberland unitary authority area.

Salterbeck does not have its own Parish Council, instead it is part of Workington Town Council.

== Salterbeck ACE ==
Salterbeck ACE is a successful community business run as a social enterprise. It manages the Oval Centre which has rooms for hire, a bar, cafe and gym. Salterbeck ACE also runs landscaping and decorating teams which have corporate contracts as well as with private individuals.

== Back field ==
In the centre of Salterbeck there is an area of land which is referred to by locals as "The back field". On the ground there is a large children’s park and a football pitch which is home to the local amateur football team Salterbeck FC as well as various youth teams. The ground was also once home to Salterbeck Storm A.R.L.F.C (which is no longer in existence).

== Schools in Salterbeck ==
=== Current schools ===
- St. Mary's Catholic Primary School, Holden Road.

=== Previous schools ===
- Garth Infant School, Coronation Drive (Demolished)
- Southfield Technology College, Moorclose Road (Closed in 2015 along with Stainburn School and Science College and merged into Workington Academy. The new school’s building opened on the former Stainburn site in 2017 in Workington. Since the closure, Southfield Technology College has been demolished)

== Places in Salterbeck ==
- The Oval Centre, Salterbeck Drive
- Harrington Royal British Legion, Salterbeck Road
- Harrington Nature Reserve, Moorclose Road
- Salterbeck Reservoir, Shore Road
