= St Joseph's Catholic High School, Workington =

St Joseph's Catholic High School
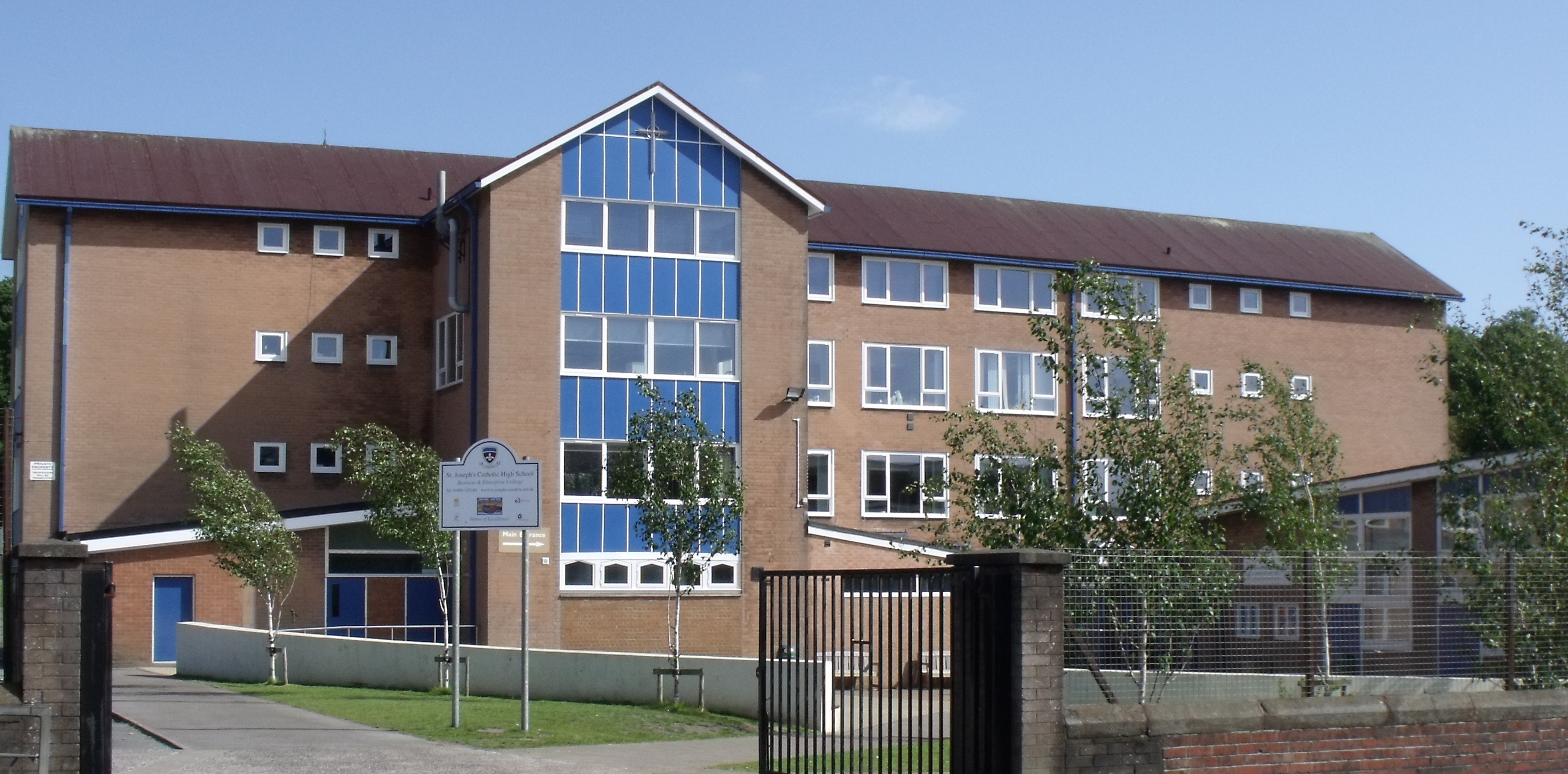

Location
- Harrington Road; Workington, Cumbria, CA14 3EE; England; 54°38′24″N 3°32′39″W

Information
- Type: Academy
- Motto: Latin: Ausculta "Listen"
- Religious affiliation: Roman Catholic
- Established: 1929
- Local authority: Cumberland Council
- Trust: Mater Christi Multi Academy Trust
- Department for Education URN: 148703 Tables
- Ofsted: Reports
- Headteacher: Ian Nevitt
- Gender: Co-educational
- Age: 11 to 16
- Enrolment: ~710
- Website: Official website

St Joseph’s Catholic High School (colloquially known as St Joseph's) is a co-educational Roman Catholic secondary school located in Workington, Cumbria, England.

== History ==
The school has stood on the same site since it opened in 1929, however the building has received a number of alterations, such as the addition of various extra blocks, an AstroTurf, a new library, a canteen extension, a separate building for English lessons, and a move around and adaptation of most of the classrooms throughout the school. It has also acquired a specialism in Business and Enterprise, and more recently, embarked on a Leading Edge programme in Drama...

Previously a voluntary aided school administered by Cumbria County Council, in September 2021 St Joseph's Catholic High School converted to academy status. It is now sponsored by the Mater Christi Multi Academy Trust, and continues to be under the jurisdiction of the Roman Catholic Diocese of Lancaster.
