= The Whitehaven Academy =

- School badge

Location
- Cleator Moor Road; Hensingham; Whitehaven, Cumbria, CA28 8TY; England; 54.53901°N 3.55741°W

Information
- Type: Academy
- Motto: "Respect, Responsibility, Resiliance"
- Local authority: Cumberland Council
- Trust: Cumbria Education Trust
- Department for Education URN: 146634 Tables
- Ofsted: Reports
- Headteacher: Nigel Youngman
- Staff: 90
- Gender: Coeducational; boys and girls
- Age: 11 to 18
- Enrolment: 655 (2023)
- Colour
- Website: whitehavenacademy.org.uk

The Whitehaven Academy (formerly Whitehaven School) is an 11–18 comprehensive co-educational secondary school with academy status, located in Whitehaven, in west Cumbria, England. The school was established in 1984, and in 2023 had a total of 655 pupils, both boys and girls, enrolled.

== History ==
=== Early history ===
The Whitehaven School opened in 1984 taking pupils from the Whitehaven Grammar School which had moved to the Overend site in 1968, Overend School itself which had opened on this site in 1960, and Richmond Street Secondary Modern School which had occupied the former Grammar School site in 1969.

It had a full inspection in 2004 where it was described as a larger than average improving school. It noted "Its pupils’ socio-economic circumstances are well below average with an above average number known to be entitled to free school meals. Standards on entry to the school are below average; those of the boys are well below." A February 2011 report from the Office for Standards in Education, Children's Services and Skills (Ofsted) said that then Whitehaven School has made inadequate progress in making improvements and demonstrating a better capacity for sustained improvement' in the previous two years, according to a report issued subsequent to an Ofsted team visit in January 2011. Lynette Norris, who took over as headteacher in 2011, was described as bringing 'vision and energy' to the school since she took office.

=== Academy status ===
The school converted to academy status in January 2014, sponsored by the Bright Tribe Trust, and was renamed the Whitehaven Academy. The past records of school were obscured, it gained a new Ofsted Unique Reference Number and establishment number.

In January 2015 the trust announced that they had appointed Philip Grant as the new principal, who was moving to the academy from Newton Rigg College, Penrith where he was the director of studies. Grant took up his position on 16 March 2015. Then Grant was replaced by Warren Turner for the academic year 2016/17. Turner had previously acted as principal at Richard Rose Morton Academy in Carlisle.

=== Special measures ===
In November 2016 the school was placed in special measures following an Ofsted inspection. Parents, teachers, and politicians were critical of the Bright Tribe Trust. The building was physically deteriorating and was not watertight. Staff and parents were concerned about the lack of teaching resources with some teachers printing exam practice papers at home using their own materials, such was the shortage in school. Staff raised their concerns writing directly to the Regional Schools Commissioner, Janet Renou, who claims she has been working with Bright Tribe and the Education and Skills Funding Agency to try to address the state of the building.

Parents and staff remained dissatisfied: one child was taken to hospital after being hit by falling debris, one lunch session being stopped because rain was dripping on to food and rainwater falling on to electric sockets. The staff explained that much of the building had to be cordoned off when it rained. A series of strikes was planned for December 2017 and January 2018 to highlight the need for a new sponsor.

=== Sponsorship issues ===
The school was in limbo, it did not have the option to return to local authority control. It could not make long-term planning decisions, hire new permanent members of staff or organise pay rises. The government struggled to find a new chain willing and able to take on the school, which is in a precarious financial position.

On 30 November 2017 it was announced that a new sponsor would be found for the school, as the Bright Tribe Trust had relinquished control. The multi-academy trust, which runs nine other primary and secondary schools throughout Cumbria, confirmed that its chief operating officer was stepping down. It also pulled out of a proposed sponsorship for Haydon Bridge High School in Northumberland, as the school was running an increasing financial deficit. Bright Tribe blames its failure on "historical underinvestment before its involvement". Janet Renou said "...it is clear that a new sponsor is required to deliver the improvement needed to ensure pupils get the education they deserve – and the process of identifying an alternative is under way."

In December 2017, 64 academy status schools were waiting to find a new sponsor after being abandoned by, or relinquished by their managing trust. Using average enrolments of 279 pupils for state primary schools and 946 for state secondary schools this would mean over 40,000 students are affected. In 2018, it emerged that the Bright Tribe Trust had taken the money intended for repairs to the school, and then not carried out the work; the Conservative government, which had approved the academy initiative, had been warned about the problems in 2015, but had taken no action. Michael Dwan, the founder of Bright Tribe Trust and had previously made over a hundred million pounds from similar arrangements in NHS provision, said "I am not in control of the trusts and never have been." In mid 2018, the new sponsor for The Whitehaven Academy was named as Cumbria Education Trust, shortly afterwards it was announced that headteacher Warren Turner had resigned and Assistant Headteacher Andrea Bateson was taking over on an interim basis.

=== Recent history ===
The school adopted a new uniform in September 2021 to coincide with the opening of a newly constructed school building. The school formally moved into the new build campus in Spring 2022.

== Overview ==
=== Curriculum ===
In years 7 and 8, and in most cases year 9 students study the core subjects of the National Curriculum :English, Maths, Science and PE, and a range of other subjects to build core competencies and prepare for Key Stage 4. In years 8 and 9, students can study a range of other courses, ranging from outdoor learning to politics. This is Key Stage 3. In Key Stage 4, years 10, 11 and some accelerated year 9 students study the core subjects alongside a range of options. These subjects are academic, vocational or a mixture of the two. This ensures they gain the necessary qualifications of 'Five As to Cs including Maths and English' which the government requires. This is now graded 9-1.

Key Stage 5 (Sixth Form) courses are provided for students who choose to continue their study at the academy. They have opportunity to study for AS Levels, A2 Levels and BTEC qualifications.

=== Sixth form ===
In September 2020 a new level of co-operation began with the initiation of the West Coast Sixth Form. Students from Whitehaven and Workington wanting to enter one of the three pathways of sixth-form education - Academic, Vocational and Other - will study in a combined sixth form with a free bus service between the two sites. New facilities in Whitehaven are due to open in Spring of 2022. As of 2025, there is no longer bus travel between campuses.

=== Attainment ===
Academic results across the school are measured from pupils in both Key Stage 4 and Key Stage 5. In 2025, the number of pupils at Key Stage 4 attaining a Grade 5 or above grade in GCSE English and Maths was below both the local authority and national average for England, with 32.5% of pupils at The Whitehaven Academy attaining in this area, compared to an average of 36.4% across the local authority and 45.2% across England. Similarly, the number of pupils who either stayed in education, or went into apprenticeships or employment after finishing Key Stage 4 was slightly below both the local authority and national average in England, 87% for the school, and 91% for both the local authority and England wide.

In 2023, the number of Key Stage 4 pupils attaining a Grade 5 or above in English and Maths qualifications was as low as 15.8%, in comparison to the local authority average of 37.4% and national average in England of 45.3%. By 2024, attainment figures in this area had increased considerably, to 38.6% for the school against 38.4% for the local authority and 45.9% for England.

== Notable former pupils ==
- James Donaldson, professional rugby player
- Steve McCurrie, rugby player
- Gregg McNally, rugby player
- Jamie Reed, Labour MP from 2005 to January 2017 for Copeland
- Cory Spedding, Junior Eurovision singer in the 2004 contest
- Tony Cooper, General Secretary from 1991 of the Engineers' and Managers' Association, then of Prospect from 2001–02, then Chairman from 2002-05 of the Nuclear Industry Association (NIA), and father of Yvette Cooper, Labour MP since 2010 for Normanton, Pontefract and Castleford and former Secretary of State for Work and Pensions
- Robert Fell CB CBE, Chief Executive from 1975-82 of the London Stock Exchange
- Jim Graham OBE, Managing Director from 1982-96 of Border Television, then Chief Executive from 1996–98
- Prof Peter Halfpenny, Professor of Sociology from 1993-2010 at the University of Manchester
- Cyril Hazard, radio astronomer
- Alf Parrish, Chief Constable from 1981-85 of Derbyshire Constabulary
- Sir Derek Pattinson, Secretary-General from 1972-90 of the General Synod
- Tom Rawling, poet
- Joan Rodgers CBE, soprano
