= Workington Academy =

Location
- Stainburn Road; Workington, Cumbria, CA14 4EB; England; 54.6417°N 3.5328°W

Information
- Type: Academy
- Established: 2015
- Local authority: Cumberland Council
- Trust: Cumbria Education Trust
- Department for Education URN: 141499 Tables
- Ofsted: Reports
- Head of School: Barry Simpson
- Executive Headteacher: Mark Bedford
- Gender: Mixed
- Age: 11 to 18
- Enrollment: 1276 (Note: As of 15 November 2024.)
- Houses: Bessemer, Curwen, Risman, Thompson
- Website: Workington Academy website

Workington Academy is a mixed secondary school located in Workington, Cumbria. It was established in September 2015 following the merger of Southfield Technology College and Stainburn School and Science College.

== History ==
=== Establishment ===
In 2014, both Southfield Technology College and Stainburn School and Science College were placed into special measures by Ofsted after receiving inadequate inspection reports. As a result, it was decided that the two schools would close and merge to form a new academy.

To support the transition, an executive headteacher, Lorrayne Hughes, was appointed. It was also announced that William Howard School in Brampton would act as the sponsor for the new academy. This led to the formation of the William Howard Trust, a multi-academy trust, in September 2015, which was later renamed Cumbria Education Trust.

Both schools officially closed in August 2015, and Workington Academy opened the following month.

=== New Building ===
Workington Academy was initially located in the building of the former Stainburn School and Science College. In 2015, plans for a new £20 million building were approved by Cumbria County Council, with construction taking place at the rear of the existing site.

The new building was completed in early 2017, and the academy officially relocated in March 2017. The new building was officially opened by The Duchess of Gloucester in a ceremony held in September 2017.

== West Coast Sixth Form ==
West Coast Sixth Form
- Established: 2020
- Type: Sixth Form
- Head: B Simpson
- Website: West Coast Sixth Form website
WCSF campus map

In September 2020, Workington Academy launched the West Coast Sixth Form in partnership with The Whitehaven Academy. The initiative was designed to expand post-16 education opportunities across West Cumbria, offering a broad range of academic and vocational courses.

The sixth form provides qualifications equivalent to one, two, or three A Levels, including Extended Certificates, National Diplomas, and Extended Diplomas. Courses offered include Business, Health and Social Care, Performing Arts, Applied Science, Sports Science, and Information Technology.

Students benefit from a combination of classroom-based learning and practical experience, with many vocational courses including a weekly workplace placement. Free transport is provided between the Workington and Whitehaven campuses to support accessibility.

== Workington Academy Radio ==
Workington Academy Radio is the student-run radio station of Workington Academy.

In 2020, students from the station conducted an interview with BBC Radio 1 DJ Greg James.

In 2026, the station's podcast Behind the Algorithm was highly commended in The Peter Day Award for Best Podcast at the Shine School Media Awards, while teacher Mr A Williamson won the Most Inspirational Teacher award.

=== Awards and nominations ===
Year	Group	Award	Result
2019	The Young ARIAS	Best in Sport	Nominated
2019	The Young ARIAS	Best in Comedy/Drama	Nominated
2019	The Young ARIAS	Secondary Radio Station of the Year	Nominated
2020	Young Audio Awards	Secondary Radio Station of the Year	Nominated
2023	Young Audio Awards	Secondary Radio Station of the Year	Nominated
2026	Shine School Media Awards	The Peter Day Award for Best Podcast	Highly commended
2026	Shine School Media Awards	Most Inspirational Teacher	Won

== Public criticism ==
In July 2017, Workington Academy faced criticism on social media, where parents and pupils raised concerns about the quality of teaching. Comments posted on a local Facebook page, "Workington Rants - News And Views", alleged an overreliance on supply teachers and a lack of classroom discipline, including claims that students were using mobile phones during lessons.

The interim headteacher at the time, Colette Macklin, responded to the criticism in an interview with the News and Star, defending the school and addressing the concerns raised.

== Headteachers ==
Since its establishment in 2015, Workington Academy has been led by the following headteachers and heads of school:

Name	Role	Period
Mr J Logan	Headteacher	2015 – 2016
Mrs C Macklin	Interim Headteacher	2016 – 2017
Mrs R O'Hagan	Interim Heads of School (Deputy Headteachers)	2017 – 2018
Mr M Bedford	Interim Heads of School (Deputy Headteachers)	2017 – 2018
Mr D Bird	Headteacher	2018 – 2022
Mr D Bird	Executive Headteacher	2022 – 2023
Mr M Bedford	Head of School	2022 – 2023
Mr M Bedford	Headteacher	2023 – 2026
Mr M Bedford	Executive Headteacher	2026 – present
Mr B Simpson	Head of School	2026 – present
