= Workington =

Coastal town in Cumbria, England

Coordinates: 54°38′11″N 3°33′18″W

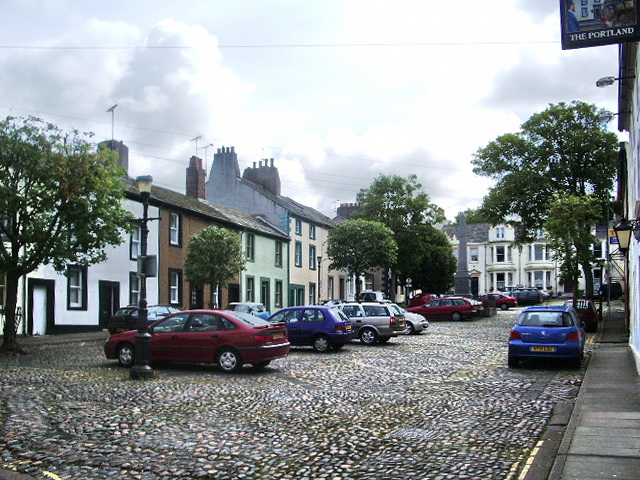
- Portland Square, 2007

- Location within Cumbria
- Population: 25,448 (Parish, 2021); 21,275 (Built up area, 2021)
- OS grid reference: NX996279
  - London: 259 mi (417 km) SE
- Civil parish: Workington
- Unitary authority: Cumberland
- Ceremonial county: Cumbria
- Region: North West
- Country: England
- Sovereign state: United Kingdom
- Post town: WORKINGTON
- Postcode district: CA14
- Dialling code: 01900; 01946
- Police: Cumbria
- Fire: Cumbria
- Ambulance: North West
- UK Parliament: Whitehaven and Workington

Workington /ˈwɜːrkɪŋtən/ is a coastal port town and civil parish in the Cumberland district of Cumbria, England. The town is at the mouth of the River Derwent on the west coast, 32 miles (51 km) south-west of Carlisle and 8 miles (13 km) north-east of Whitehaven. At the 2021 census the parish had a population of 25,448 and the built up area had a population of 21,275.

== Toponymy ==
The place-name Workington is first attested in an Anglo-Saxon charter of 946, as Wurcingtun. It appears as Wirchingetona in about 1150, meaning "the town or settlement of Weorc or Wirc's people". The "Work" element is therefore derived from a person's name.

== History ==
Between 79 and 122 CE, Roman forts, mile-forts and watchtowers were built along the Cumbrian coast, as defences against attacks by the Scoti of Ireland and the Caledonii, the most powerful tribe in what is now Scotland. The 16th century Britannia, written by William Camden, describes ruins of these defences.

A Viking sword was discovered at Northside. This is seen to suggest there was a settlement at the river mouth.

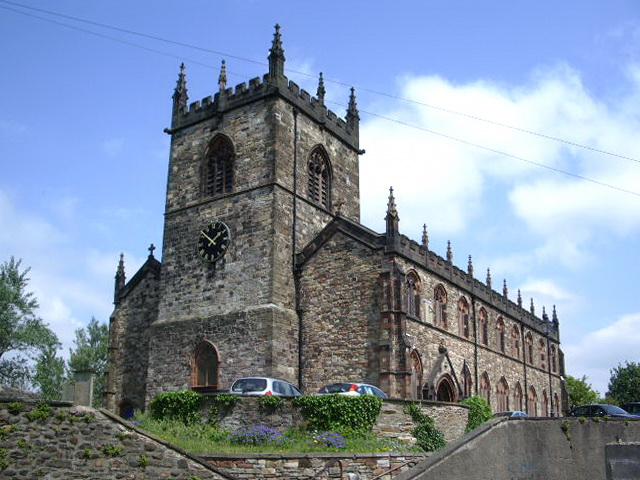
St Michael's Church

St Michael's Church stands near the south bank of the Derwent. Parts of the building date back to the 12th century. Workington Hall, now in ruins, was built in the mid-14th century as a peel tower (fortified house) and subsequently extended over many years as the seat of the lord of the manor.

The town developed as a port on the south bank of the Derwent. In the Industrial Revolution, the town became a centre for iron and steel production. The population in the 1841 census was 4,045 inhabitants. Workington railway station opened in 1845 on the Whitehaven Junction Railway.

Several bridges were damaged or destroyed by the River Derwent during the 2009 Workington floods.

=== Regeneration ===
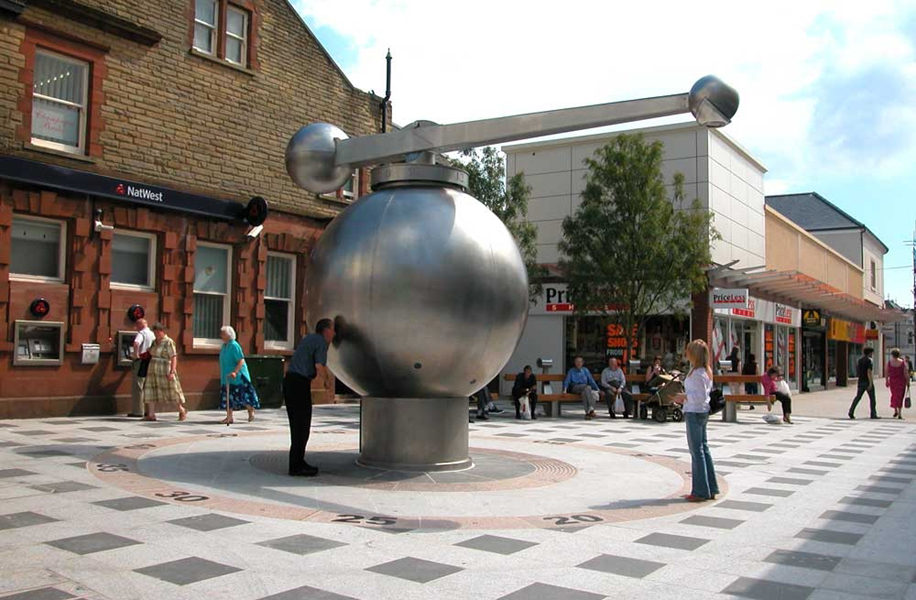
Workington's New Clock, 2008

In 2006, Washington Square, a £50 million shopping centre and mixed-use complex, was opened to replace the run-down St John's Arcade, built in the 1960s and 1970s. In 2007, the Royal Institution of Chartered Surveyors named Washington Square the "best commercial project" in North West England.

Works of public art installed in the town centre include:

- Glass canopies designed by Alexander Beleschenko
- The Coastline by Simon Hitchens
- The Hub by BASE Structures and Illustrious
- The Grilles architectural metalwork at Central Car Park by Tom Lomax in association with pupils from St Patrick's Primary School and Alan Dawson.
- Central Way public toilets with tiles designed in collaboration by ceramic artist Paul Scott and writer Robert Drake, in addition to a fish tank containing species from the Solway provided by the Lake District Coast Aquarium in Maryport by Paul Scott and Robert Drake
- Lookout Clock, an interactive town clock designed by Andy Plant and Matt Wand

While efforts have been made to find local names for the major streets of the new shopping centre, the initial planning title of Washington Square has been retained.

=== Workington Stadium plans ===
In February 2019 plans for a new stadium for Workington were announced. This would in involve the demolition of Borough Park and Derwent Park.

In June 2019, it was announced by the new leadership of Allerdale Borough Council that a new sports stadium would not be built.

=== Cloffocks development ===
A plan to build a 92,900 sq ft (8,630 m^{2}) Tesco Extra store on the Cloffocks provoked controversy and opposition from local people; a planning application was placed in 2006 by Tesco, after it acquired the Cloffocks site for £18 million; Tesco had been competing with Asda for the site since 2003. Campaigners opposed the sale, stating that the land was common ground and belonged to the people of Workington. In 2010 the Countess of Lonsdale invoked her rights to mine the land, in an attempt to prevent the development. In 2011 a closed meeting of Allerdale councillors discussed the sale of the site, but the council rescinded on its decision to sell it to Tesco in June 2011. Tesco stated that it was still seeking a site for a store of 60,000 sq ft (5,600 m^{2}) around Workington to replace the established one.

== Governance ==
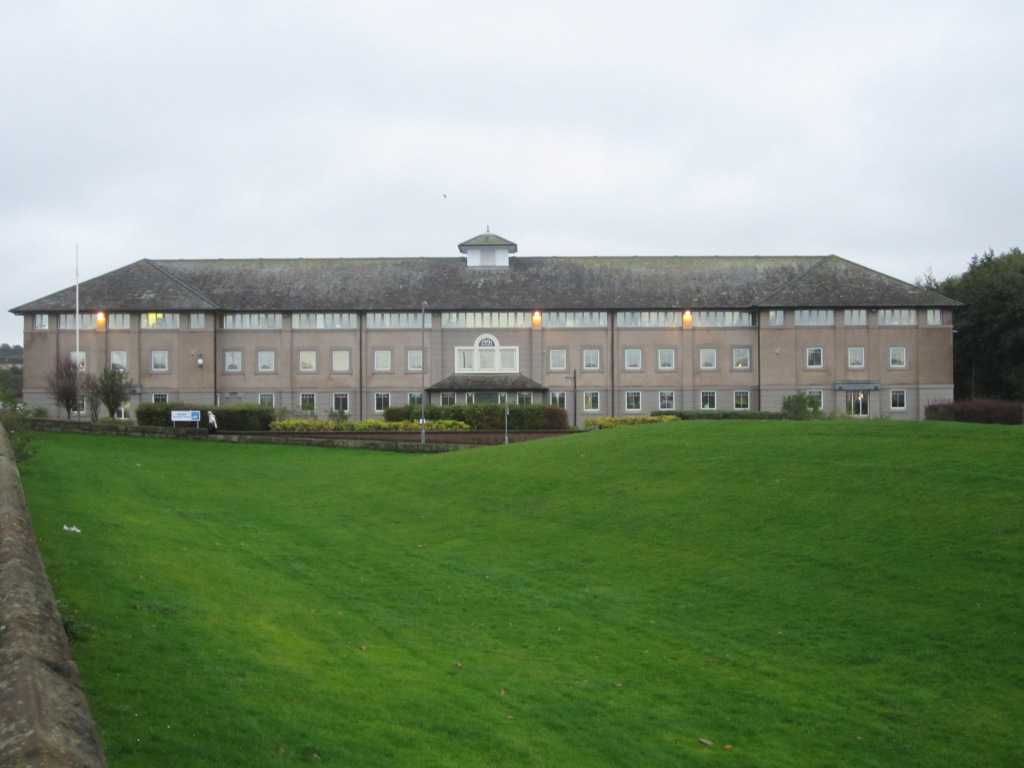
Allerdale House

There are two tiers of local government covering Workington, at parish (town) and unitary authority level: Workington Town Council and Cumberland Council. The town council is based at the Town Hall on Oxford Street. Cumberland Council also has an area office in the town, at Allerdale House.

For national elections, Workington forms part of the Whitehaven and Workington constituency, created for the 2024 general election, since when it has been represented by Josh MacAlister of the Labour Party. Between 1918 and 2024 there was a Workington constituency. It was generally a safe Labour seat, only electing a Conservative twice, in a 1976 by-election and at the 2019 general election. During the 2019 general election, the concept of the "Workington man" was devised by a think tank as a description for a certain type of voter that the national parties needed to target.

=== Administrative history ===
Workington was an ancient parish in the historic county of Cumberland. The parish was subdivided into five townships, being Great Clifton, Little Clifton, Stainburn, Winscales, and a Workington township covering the part of the parish around the town itself. From the 17th century onwards, parishes were gradually given various civil functions under the poor laws, in addition to their original ecclesiastical functions. In some cases, including Workington, the civil functions were exercised by each township separately rather than the parish as a whole. In 1866, the legal definition of 'parish' was changed to be the areas used for administering the poor laws, and so the townships also became civil parishes.

A body of improvement commissioners was established in 1840 to administer the town. The commissioner's district was initially tightly defined around the built up area, and was enlarged a couple of times as the town grew. The commissioners' district was converted into a local government district with an elected local board in 1864, and was then incorporated to become a municipal borough in 1888.

The borough initially covered part of the Workington civil parish plus the Cloffocks, which was an extra-parochial area covering some low-lying ground between two channels of the River Derwent. Under the Local Government Act 1894, parishes were no longer allowed to straddle borough boundaries, and so the parts of Workington civil parish outside the borough were made a separate parish called Workington Rural. The borough was enlarged in 1899 to take in North Side, a growing suburb north of the Derwent, which had previously been in the civil parish of Seaton. The borough was enlarged again in 1934 to take in Harrington, Stainburn, and Workington Rural, and the boundary with Winscales was adjusted at the same time.

In 1899 the borough council bought a Victorian house called Field House on Oxford Street, converting it to become the Town Hall.

The borough of Workington was abolished in 1974 under the Local Government Act 1972. The area became part of the borough of Allerdale in the new county of Cumbria. The area of the pre-1974 borough of Workington was an unparished area from 1974 until 1982, when a new civil parish of Workington matching the pre-1974 borough was created, with its parish council taking the name Workington Town Council. Allerdale was abolished in 2023 when the new Cumberland Council was created, also taking over the functions of the abolished Cumbria County Council in the area.

== Geography ==
Workington lies astride the River Derwent, on the West Cumbrian coastal plain. It is bounded to the west by the Solway Firth, part of the Irish Sea, and to the east by the Lake District.

The town has various districts, many of them established as housing estates. North of the river these include Seaton, Barepot, Northside, Port and Oldside. On the south side are the districts of Stainburn, Derwent Howe, Ashfield, Banklands, Frostoms (Annie Pit), Mossbay, Moorclose, Salterbeck, Bridgefoot, Lillyhall, Harrington, High Harrington, Clay Flatts, Kerry Park, Westfield and Great Clifton. The Marsh and Quay, a large working-class area of the town around the docks and a major part of the town's history, was demolished in the early 1980s. Much of its former area is now covered by Clay Flatts Industrial Estate.

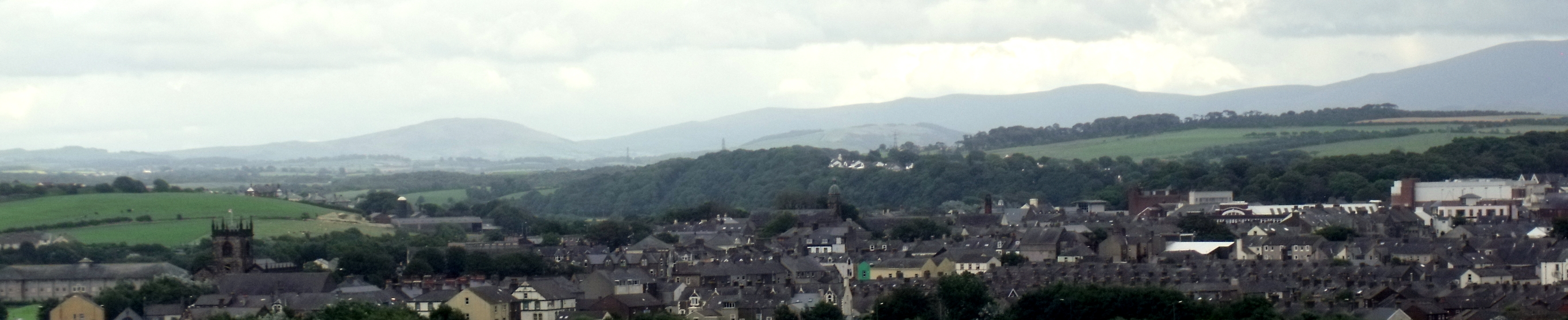
The skyline of Workington, with Lake District fells in the background, looking to the north east from the shore hills

== Economy ==
=== Iron and steel ===
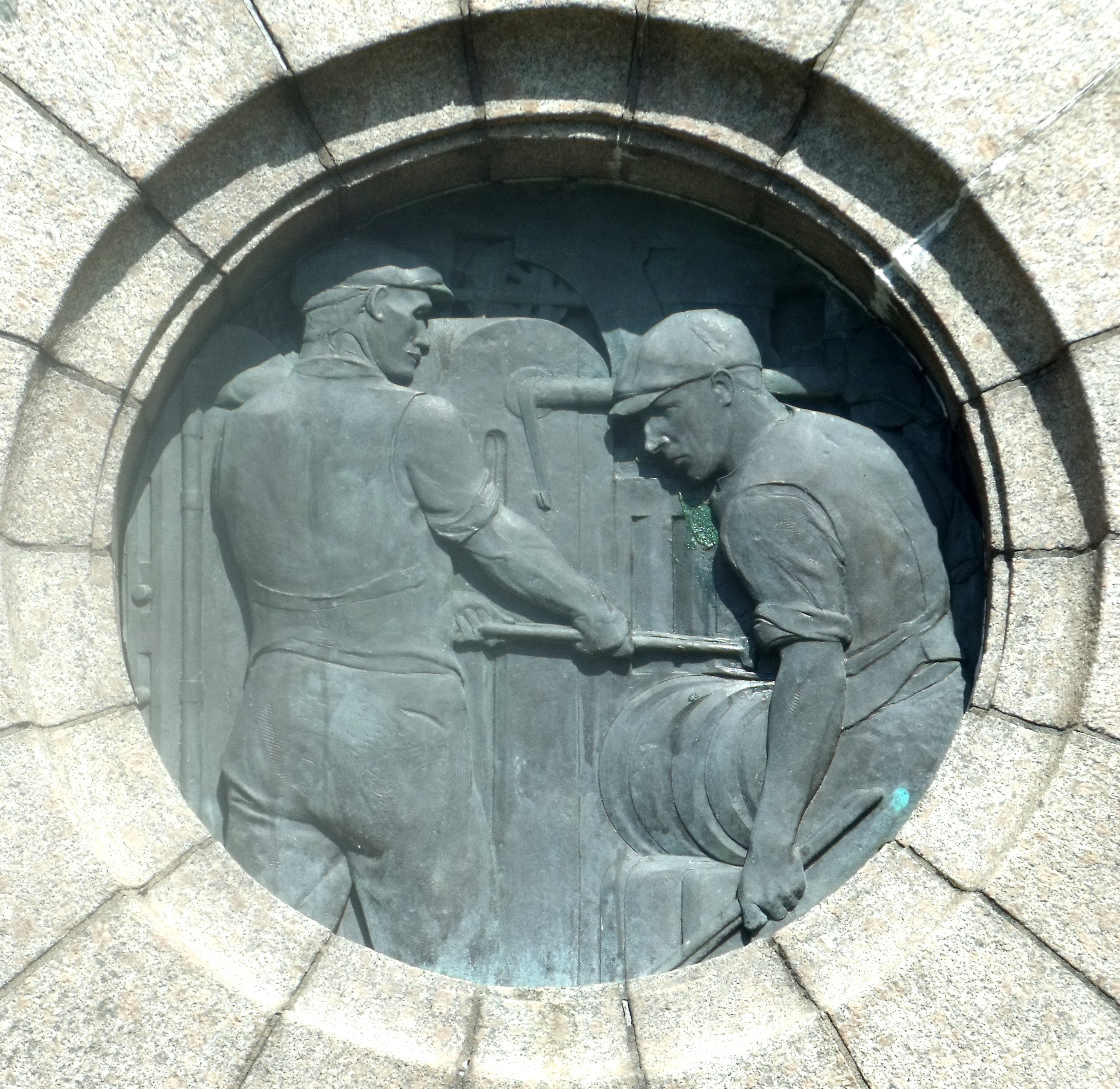
War memorial tribute to local workers in heavy industries

The Cumbria iron-ore field lies to the south of Workington, and produced extremely high grade phosphorus-free haematite. The area had a long tradition of iron smelting, but this became particularly important with the invention by Sir Henry Bessemer of the Bessemer process, the first process for mass production of mild steel, which previously had been an expensive specialist product. For the first 25 years of the process, until Gilchrist and Thomas improved upon it, phosphorus-free haematite was required. With Cumbria as the world's premier source, and the local coalfield providing energy for steel production, the world's first large-scale steelworks was opened in the Moss Bay area of the town. The Bessemer converter continued to work until July 1974. The Moss Bay Steelworks closed in 1982, despite receiving notable infrastructural investment and improvement almost immediately before the closure.

During the Second World War, a strategically important electric steel furnace which produced steel for aircraft engine ball bearings was moved to Workington from Norway to prevent it falling into Axis hands.

Workington was the home of Distington Engineering Company (DEC), the engineering arm of British Steel Corporation (BSC), which specialised in the design of continuous casting equipment. DEC, known to the local people as "Chapel Bank", had an engineering design office, engineering workshops and a foundry that at one time contained six of the seven electric arc furnaces built in Workington. The seventh was situated at the Moss Bay plant of BSC. In the 1970s, as BSC adapted to a more streamlined approach to the metals industry, the engineering design company was separated from the workshops and foundry and re-designated as Distington Engineering Contracting. Employing some 200 people, its primary purpose was the design, manufacture, installation and commissioning of continuous casting machines. This business is now owned by the TATA Group and employs 400 staff.

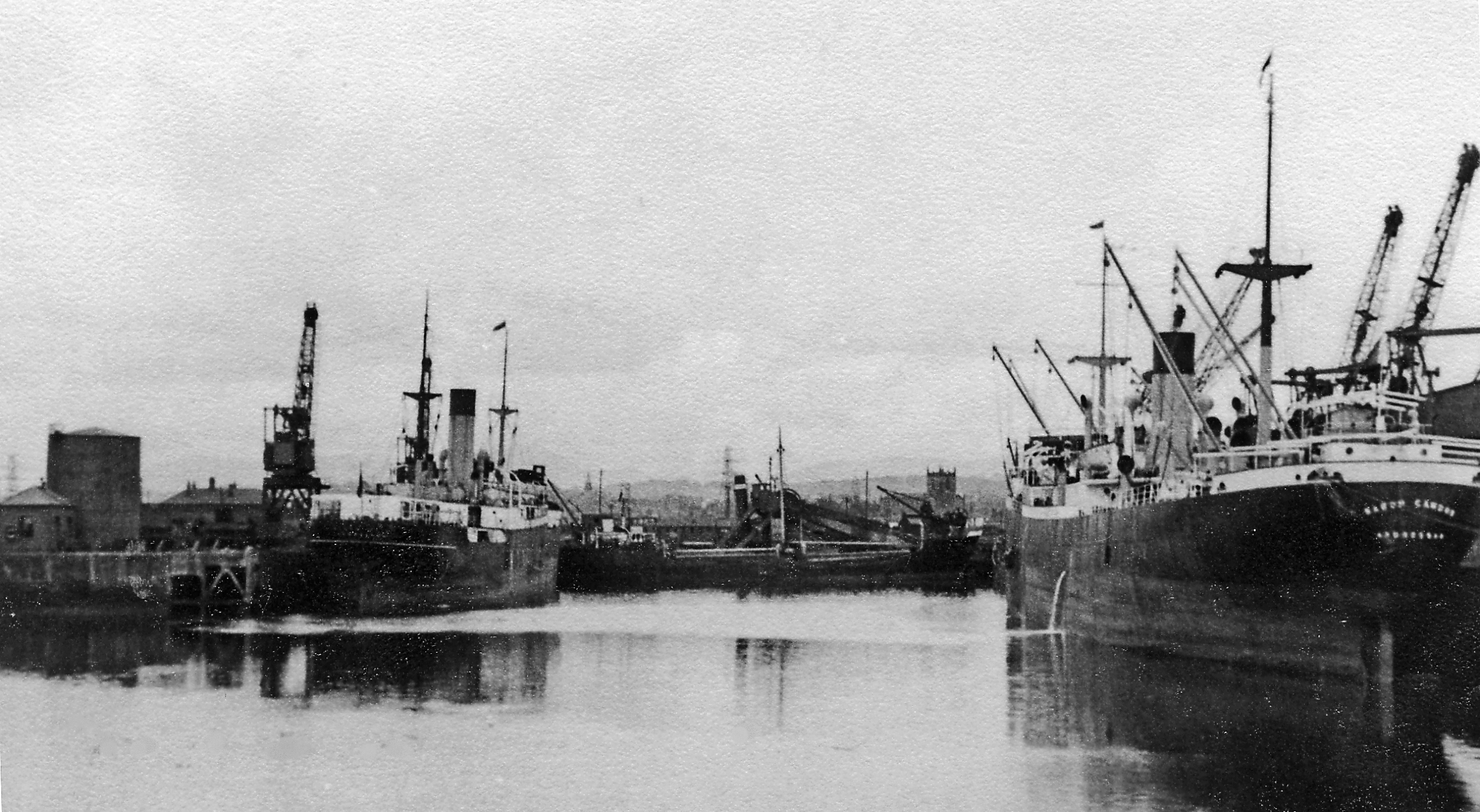
Workington Dock, with iron ore ships from Sweden

One offshoot of the steel industry was the production of railway rails. Workington rails were widely exported and a common local phrase was that Workington rails "held the world together." Originally made from Bessemer steel, but after the closure of the Moss Bay Steelworks, steel for the plant was brought by rail from Teesside. The plant was closed in August 2006, but welding work on rails produced at Corus Groups' French plant in Hayange continued at Workington for another two years, as the Scunthorpe site initially proved incapable of producing rails adequately.

=== After coal and steel ===
After the loss of the two industries on which Workington was built, coal and steel, Workington and the whole of West Cumbria became an unemployment blackspot. Industries in the town today include chemicals, cardboard, the docks (originally built by the United Steel Co.), waste management and recycling old computers for export, mainly to poorer countries. The town also houses the British Cattle Movement Service, a government agency set up to oversee the British beef and dairy industry after the BSE crisis in Britain. It is based in the former steelworks offices. Many Workington residents are employed outside the town in the nuclear industry located in and around Sellafield, West Cumbria's dominant employment sector.

=== Vehicle manufacture ===
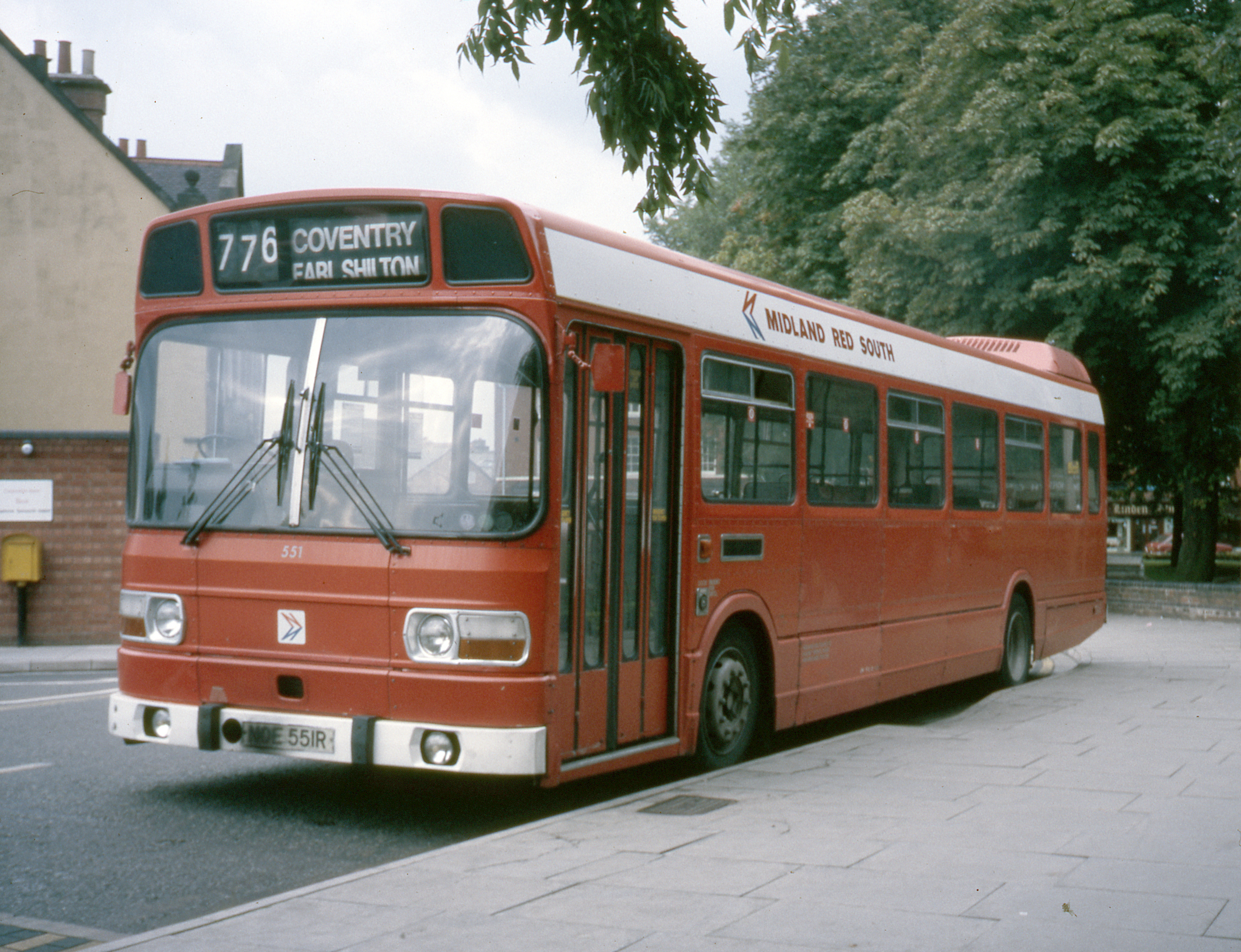
A Leyland National bus, built in Workington

British Leyland opened a factory in Lillyhall, just outside Workington, initially to build the Leyland National bus in the 1970s and 1980s. Produced primarily for the state-owned National Bus Company, the Leyland National was styled by Italian designer Giovanni Michelotti, and included a roof-mounted heating unit in a pod at the rear of the bus. The Lillyhall factory later built the Leyland Titan, Leyland Olympian and Leyland Lynx buses.

In the 1980s, Leyland manufactured Pacer railbus and Sprinter-type commuter trains at Workington. The bodyshells of the Pacer trains were based on the Leyland National bus design, designed as a cheap stop-gap by British Rail.

Volvo Buses acquired Leyland Buses in 1988. By 1993, the factory had closed with the loss of 200 jobs. The former bus plant is now a warehouse for the logistics company Eddie Stobart, which bought the property in 1995.

== Transport ==
Workington is linked by the A596 road to Maryport, to Whitehaven via A595 road, by the A66 road to Penrith and continues to Scotch Corner in County Durham.

The town has its own bus station and bus services run by Stagecoach to other towns and villages in Cumbria, such as Cockermouth, Keswick, Penrith, Carlisle, Wigton, Maryport, Whitehaven, Frizington, Egremont and Thornhill.

The Cumbrian Coast Line provides rail connections from Workington to Carlisle and Barrow-in-Furness, with occasional through trains to Lancaster and Preston.

Workington North railway station opened on 30 November 2009 as a temporary means of crossing the river after road bridges had been closed by flooding. A free train service between Workington (Main) and Maryport was funded by the government.

The Workington Transport Heritage Trust, preserves the transport heritage of Workington and the surrounding area and is run by volunteers.

Workington was the headquarters of the haulage company J. Roper (Workington) Ltd, which was based in Moss Bay. Workington has also been the home to the headquarters of family haulage business J.R Dixon Haulage & Storage since 1953.

== Arts and entertainment ==
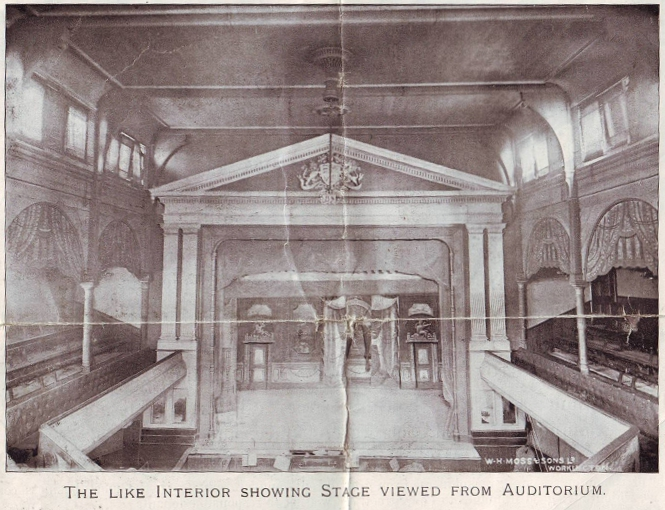
The Workington Opera House – Pre 1927

Workington is home to three theatres: the Carnegie Theatre, Theatre Royal and Workington Opera House. In the past Workington was a big town for variety acts and theatre and hosted many top acts including Tommy Cooper and Shirley Bassey. Workington Opera House also hosted many circus shows that included elephants and other circus animals performing on stage.

The Carnegie Theatre and Theatre Royal are still open and put on performances all year round. The Workington Opera House is currently closed after its last use as a bingo hall. The "Opera Action" group plans to restore it as a working theatre.

The town once had four cinemas (the Carnegie, the Hippodrome, the Oxford and the Ritz), all now closed. There remains only the Parkway Cinema at Dunmail Park. During the 1950s, films were also shown at the Opera House.

=== Cultural festivals ===
On 19 September 2009, Valentine Rock took place; a 19-band charity music festival. It was staged at the Ernest Valentine Ground home of Workington Cricket Club. Artists included The Chairmen, Novellos, With Lights Out, Volcanoes, Breed, Colt 45, Relics, Telf, Thir13een, Slagbank, Hangin' Threads and Hand of Fate. Profits went to the RNLI and West Cumberland Lions.

== Media ==
Local news and television programmes are provided by BBC North East and Cumbria and ITV Border. Television signals are received from the Caldbeck and local relay transmitters.

Local radio stations are BBC Radio Cumbria, Greatest Hits Radio Cumbria & South West Scotland and Workington Academy Radio, a student based radio station that broadcast to the Workington Academy.

The town is served by the local newspaper, Times & Star.

== Sport ==
=== Uppies and Downies ===
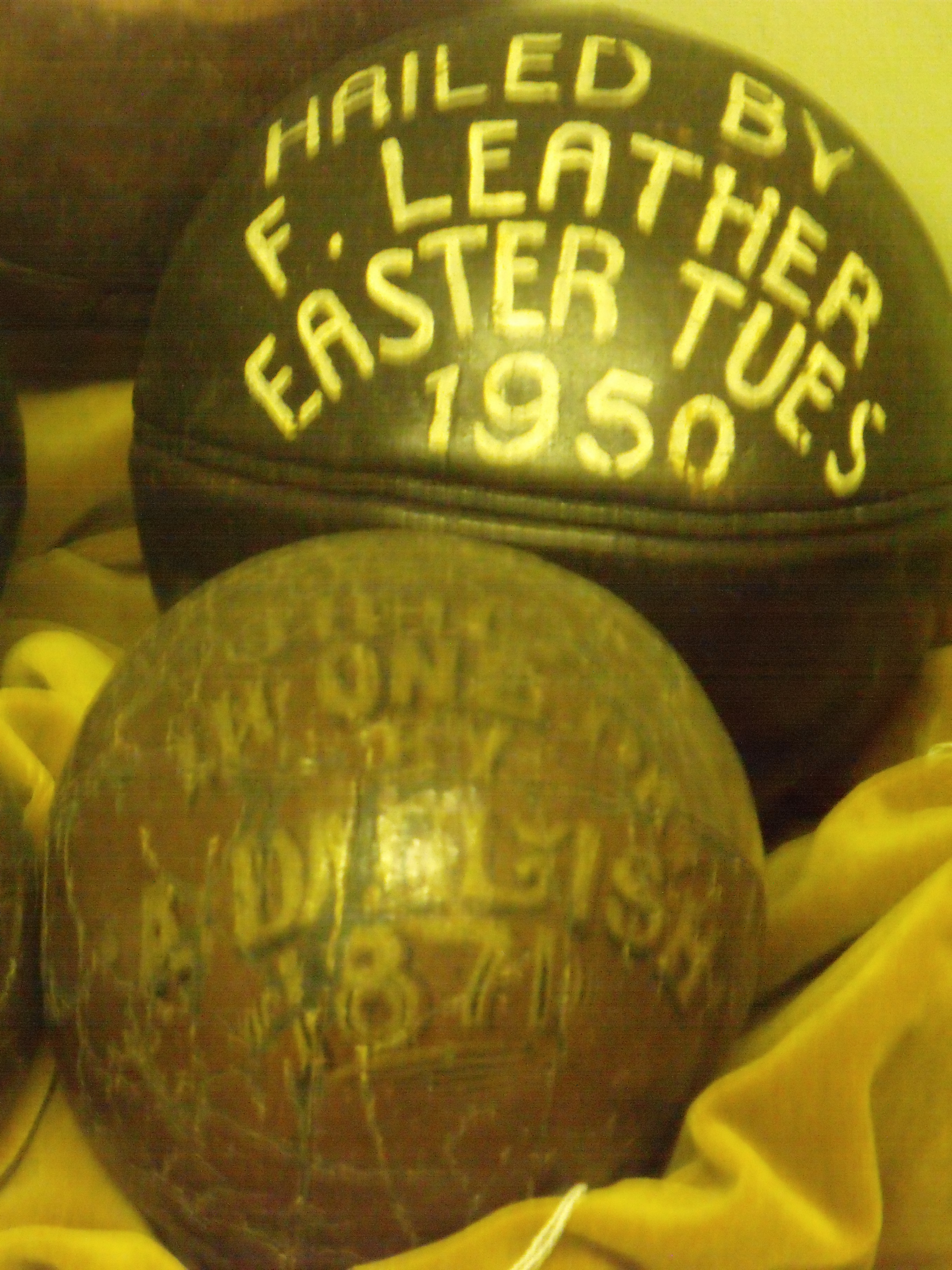
Uppies and Downies balls hailed in 1871 and 1950.

Workington is home to the ball game known as Uppies and Downies, a traditional version of football with medieval origins in mob football or an even earlier form. Since 2001, matches have raised over £75,000 for local charities. An Uppies and Downies ball is made from four pieces of cow leather. It is 21 inches (53 cm) in circumference and weighs about two and a half pounds (1.1 kg). Only three hand-made balls are produced every year and each is dated.

=== Football ===
The town has a football team, Workington A.F.C., with its stadium at Borough Park. Formerly a professional football team it now competes as a non-League club. "Dronnies", a group of steel workers that had migrated to the town from Dronfield, Derbyshire, formed the nucleus of the original Workington F.C. in 1888. It was one of the first teams managed by Bill Shankly.

Workington A.F.C. was replaced in the Football League by Wimbledon F.C. in 1977.

=== Rugby League ===
The town has a semi-professional rugby league team, Workington Town, based at Derwent Park Fibrus Community Stadium.

=== Rugby Union ===
Workington is the home to the rugby union team Workington Zebras, which plays its matches on the Ellis Sports Ground.

=== Bowling ===
There are two bowling greens, one in Vulcan Park and another on High Cloffocks, south of the River Derwent. Teams and individuals from both greens compete in local, regional and national competitions.

=== Golf ===
Workington's first golf club appeared in 1893 and played north of the River Derwent near Siddick. Known as West Cumberland Golf Club, it used a nine-hole course until the First World War, when it closed. After the war the club formed again as Workington Golf Club and moved to the present Hunday Wood location. Five-times Open Champion and renowned course architect James Braid was consulted on the layout. Considered "one of the premier courses in Cumbria", it was influenced in the 1950s by F. G. Hawtree and by Howard Swan today.

=== Speedway ===
Workington Comets are the town's professional speedway team, which competes in the SGB Championship League.

Before World War II racing was staged at Lonsdale Park, next to Borough Park, on the banks of the River Derwent. The sport did not return to the town until 1970. In 1987, Derwent Park was a temporary home to the Glasgow Tigers, which briefly became the Workington Tigers before withdrawing from the league. Speedway returned to Workington, and the team operated with varying degrees of success - in 2008 it won the Young Shield and the Premier League Four-Team and Pairs Championships - before closing for the final time in 2018. The team now races at Northside Speedway, (which was built originally as a training track in 2008), with the Comets returning to professional league racing in 2023.

=== Cricket ===
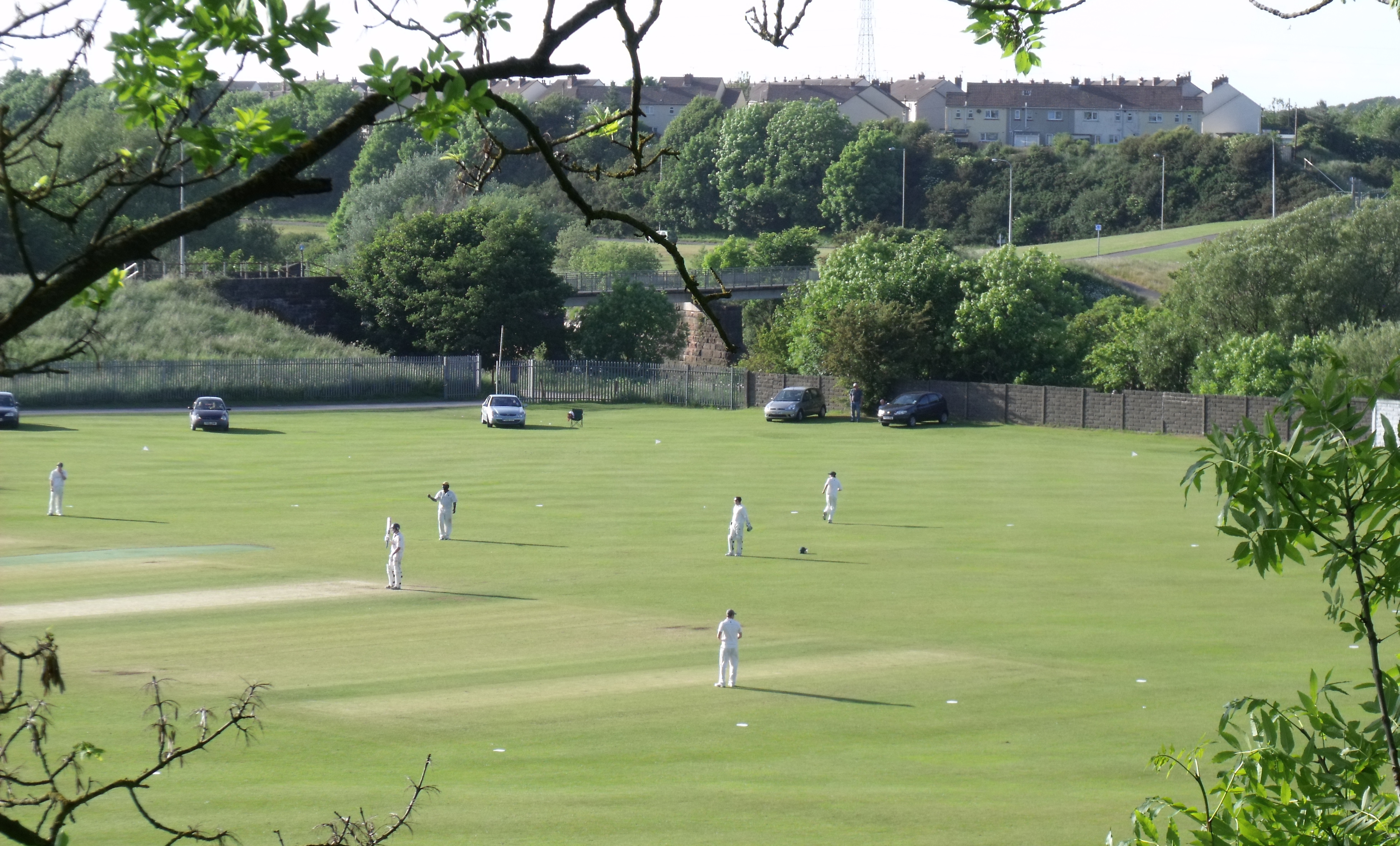
Valentine Cricket Ground on the High Cloffock

Workington Cricket Club plays at the Ernest Valentine Ground, on the High Cloffock near the River Derwent and the town centre. It is a thriving club with three senior teams and a growing junior section putting out six teams. It is affiliated to Cumbria Cricket League, Cumbria Cricket Board, Cumbria Junior Cricket League and the West Allerdale & Copeland Cricket Association.

Cumbria Cricket Board Open Courses are led by coaches at the town's Stainburn School. These are open to Years 4–10 pupils.

=== Angling ===
Workington and District Sea Angling Club takes part in regular monthly matches. It meets every month in the Union Jack Club, Senhouse Street, Workington. It also arranges tuition for its anglers.

Freshwater anglers are active on local rivers, especially the River Derwent.

=== Athletics ===
Workington has opportunities for track and field, triathlon, road running, cross-country, fell running and orienteering. All of its schools and clubs are affiliated to the Cumbria Athletics Association, except orienteering which is organised through its own national federation. Athletes tend to join clubs which concentrate on their particular discipline. Cumberland Fell Runners; Cumberland Athletics Club; Derwent and West Cumberland AC; Seaton Athletics Club; Workington Zebras AC and West Cumberland Orienteering Club are the most popular at present.

Primary schools have a well organised inter-school programme. Secondary schools focus especially on the Allerdale District School's Championships, which lead on to the Cumbria Schools Championships. The results of Cumbria's championships guide selection of the county teams to compete in the English Schools Athletic Association Championships. Over the years, Workington athletes have earned English Schools Championship honours.

=== Motorbike road riding ===
There is a Cumbria Coalition of Motorcycle Clubs. The West Cumbrian motorcycle club, the Roadburners, was established in 1989 and regularly features at local and national motorbike rallies and charity road runs. It welcomes new members interested in multi-cylinder machines. The National Chopper Club also has some local members.

=== Cycling ===
The opening stage of the Tour of Britain Women's cycle race passed through Workington in 2026.

== Twin towns ==
Workington is twinned with:

- Selm, Germany
- Val-de-Reuil, France

== See also ==
- Listed buildings in Workington
- The Stars Look Down, film partly filmed at St Helens Siddick Colliery at Workington.
- Workington Academy
- Derwent Park
- Borough Park (Workington)
- Lakes College
