= Woodside, Cumbria =

Civil parish in Cumbria, England

Coordinates: 54.84°N 3.16°W

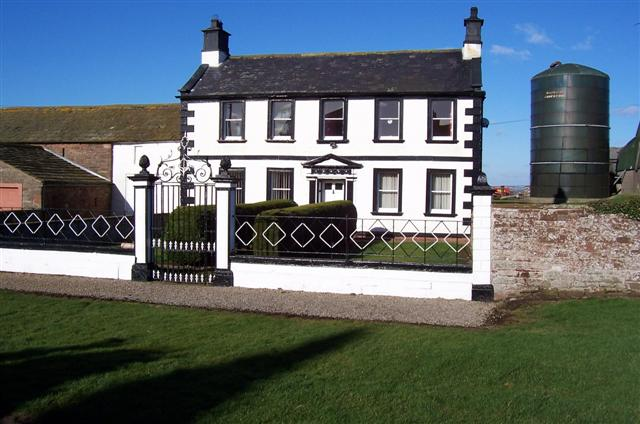
Kirkland Hall Farm - one of the grade II listed buildings in the parish

Woodside is a civil parish in the Cumberland district, Cumbria, England. At the 2011 census it had a population of 516. The parish has an area of 27.14 square kilometres (10.48 sq mi)

The southern half of the parish almost completely encircles the town of Wigton. To the south east the parish is bordered by Westward (which also has a short boundary with Wigton, between two lengths of Woodside boundary), to the west by Waverton, to the north west by Holme East Waver, to the north by Kirkbride, and to the east by Aikton and Thursby, the eastern boundary following the River Wampool. The main settlement in the parish is the hamlet of Oulton; the parish also includes the hamlets of Aikhead, Moorhouse, High Longthwaite, Kirkland and Dockray. The A596 road from Carlisle to Aspatria passes through the parish, and the A595 road from Carlisle to Workington runs just outside its south eastern border. The north west corner of the parish is within the South Solway Mosses National Nature Reserve.

There is a parish council, the lowest tier of local government.

== History ==
The parish was formed in 1894 from Wigton cum Woodside, and on 1 April 1934 Oulton parish was abolished and merged with Woodside.

== Listed buildings ==
As of 2017 there are 16 listed buildings in the parish, all at grade II.
