= Holme East Waver =

Civil parish in Cumbria, England

Coordinates: 54.8812°N 3.26209°W

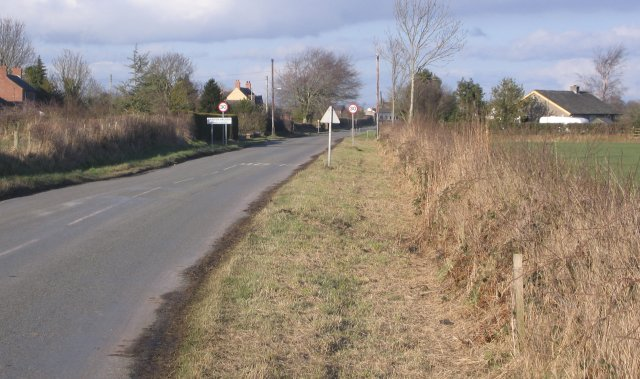
- The road into Newton Arlosh, the largest village in Holme East Waver.

- Location within Cumbria
- Population: 340 (Parish, 2021)
- Civil parish: Holme East Waver
- Unitary authority: Cumberland
- Ceremonial county: Cumbria
- Region: North West
- Country: England
- Sovereign state: United Kingdom
- Post town: Wigton
- Postcode district: CA7
- Police: Cumbria
- Fire: Cumbria
- Ambulance: North West
- UK Parliament: Penrith and Solway

Holme East Waver is a civil parish in the Cumberland district of Cumbria, England. The largest village in the parish is Newton Arlosh. It lies 13 miles (21 km) west of Carlisle. The name references the River Waver, and the rivers Waver and Wampool enter the Solway Firth at the western end of the parish. Part of the Solway Coast Area of Outstanding Natural Beauty is within the parish. At the 2021 census, the parish had a population of 340.

== Geography ==
Much of the northern and western parts of the parish are marshland, dominated by the channels of the Waver and Wampool. The west of the parish includes areas that are covered by the Solway Firth at high tide. As such, the inhabited areas of the parish are all to the east. Newton Arlosh is the main village in the parish; other hamlets include Angerton, Moss Side, Raby and Salt Coates.

The B5307 road runs through the parish, between Abbeytown to the south and Carlisle to the east. Wigton, which serves as post town for the parish, lies 7 miles (11 km) to the south-east. The parish is bordered to the north by the civil parish of Bowness-on-Solway, to the east by the civil parishes of Kirkbride, Woodside, and Waverton, and to the south by the civil parishes of Dundraw and Holme Abbey, and an area known as Skinburness Marsh, which is common to the parishes of Holme St Cuthbert, Holme Low, and Holme Abbey. The parish also has a border with the parish of Silloth-on-Solway to the west across the tidal flats at the mouth of the Waver.

== Governance ==
There are two tiers of local government covering Holme East Waver, at civil parish and unitary authority level: Holme East Waver Parish Council and Cumberland Council. The parish council meets at the parish hall in Newton Arlosh.

=== Administrative history ===
Holme East Waver was historically a township in the ancient parish of Holme Cultram, which had its parish church at Abbeytown. From the 17th century onwards, parishes were gradually given various civil functions under the poor laws, in addition to their original ecclesiastical functions. In some cases, including Holme Cultram, the civil functions were exercised by each township separately rather than the parish as a whole. In 1866, the legal definition of 'parish' was changed to be the areas used for administering the poor laws, and so Holme East Waver also became a civil parish.

== Population ==
At the 2021 census, the population of the parish was 340. At the 2001 census, the population had been 306, and in 2011 it was 318.

== See also ==
- Listed buildings in Holme East Waver
