= Aikhead =

Hamlet in Cumbria, England

Coordinates: 54.8325°N 3.188611°W

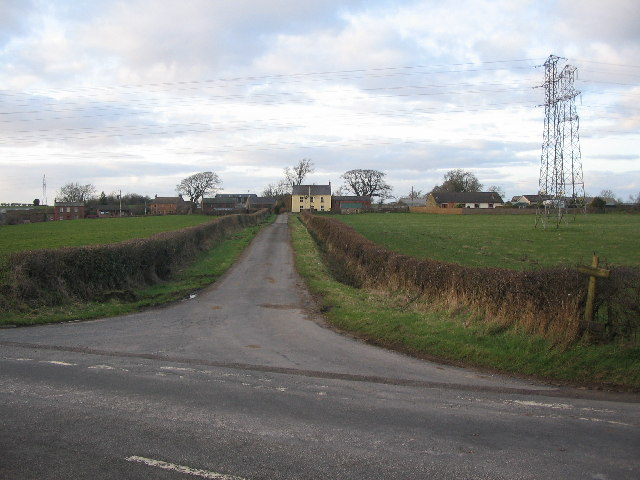
- Aikhead

- Location in Allerdale, Cumbria Location within Cumbria
- OS grid reference: NY236492
- Civil parish: Woodside
- Unitary authority: Cumberland
- Ceremonial county: Cumbria
- Region: North West
- Country: England
- Sovereign state: United Kingdom
- Post town: WIGTON
- Postcode district: CA7
- Dialling code: 016973
- Police: Cumbria
- Fire: Cumbria
- Ambulance: North West
- UK Parliament: Penrith and Solway

Aikhead is a hamlet in Cumbria, England, within the Lake District. It is about one and a half miles northwest of Wigton, and is in the civil parish of Woodside. The hamlet was the residence of John Rooke, an English geologist.
