= Listed buildings in Thursby =

Thursby is a civil parish in the Cumberland district, Cumbria, England. It contains 23 listed buildings that are recorded in the National Heritage List for England. All the listed buildings are designated at Grade II, the lowest of the three grades, which is applied to "buildings of national importance and special interest". The parish contains the village of Thursby, and is otherwise almost completely rural. The major building in the parish was Crofton Hall, but this was demolished in about 1958. A number of buildings associated with the hall have survived and are listed. Most of the other listed buildings are houses and associated structures, farmhouses and farm buildings. The other listed buildings include milestones, a bridge, and a public house.

== Buildings ==
Name and location	Photograph	Date	Notes
Greenwood Cottage; 54.84248°N 3.04853°W	—	Mid 17th century (probable)	The house was extended in the 18th century. The original part is in clay, the extension is in sandstone, and the roof is in Welsh slate. There are two storeys, the original part has three bays, the extension at right-angles has two bays, and there is a lean-to kitchen. The doorway and windows on the front date from the 20th century and have brick surrounds. At the rear the doorways and the windows, which are sashes, have stone surrounds. Inside the house is a bressumer.
Evening Hill Farmhouse and barn 54.83786°N 3.05120°W	—	Mid or late 17th century	The barn dates from the 18th century, and the farmhouse was extended in the early 19th century. The buildings are in sandstone, the house has a Welsh slate roof, and the barn has a roof in sandstone slate. The house has two storeys and three bays, with a two-bay extension to the right and a rear outshut. The windows are sashes. Between the house and the barn is a roofed cart entrance. The barn has a doorway and ventilation slits on two levels.
Outbuildings, Evening Hill Farm; 54.83786°N 3.05149°W	—	Mid or late 17th century	The building was extended in the 18th century. The original part is in clay, repaired in sandstone, and with a corrugated iron roof. The later part is in sandstone with a sandstone slate roof. The building has two storeys and is in an L-shaped plan. The openings include cart entrances, doorways, and casement windows, and in the extension is a dove opening and external steps leading to a loft door.
Rosedene and adjoining house 54.84235°N 3.05423°W	—	Late 17th century (probable)	Originally one house, it was extended in the late 18th century and has been divided into two properties. The building is rendered over clay to the left and sandstone to the right, and the roof is mainly of Welsh slate with some sandstone slate. There are two storeys and three bays with a two-bay extension to the right. The doorways and windows, which are sashes, have stone surrounds.
Outbuilding, Whitegates; 54.84308°N 3.04868°W	—	Late 17th century	Originally a farmhouse, later extended and used for other purposes, it is in clay, and has been repaired with sandstone and brick. There are large plinth stones, the walls have been raised in sandstone, the roof is in Welsh slate, and the extension is in stone. The building has 1 1/2 storeys and five bays. The doorways and windows have stone surrounds. Above the door is an inscribed and dated lintel, the windows are sashes, and there is a small fire window.
How End Farmhouse and barns 54.83821°N 3.06734°W	—	Early 18th century (probable)	The farmhouse is in sandstone on a square plinth and has quoins and a Welsh slate roof. There are two storeys and four bays. The doorways and windows, which are sashes, have stone surrounds. To the right is a two-storey barn and beyond that a single-storey barn. These are built in a variety of materials, including sandstone, and clay repaired with sandstone and breeze blocks, and the roofs are of corrugated iron and sandstone slate; they contain doorways and ventilation slits.
Old Vicarage; 54.84298°N 3.05353°W	—	Mid 18th century (probable)	The vicarage was extended in the early 19th century, and has since been used as a private house. It is rendered, with quoins in the extension, and has a green slate roof, hipped on the extension. There are two storeys and three bays, with the two-bay extension forming an L-shaped plan. In the angle is an entrance extension that has a doorway with a stone surround and a radial fanlight. The windows are sashes in stone surrounds.
Holly Lodge; 54.84297°N 3.04797°W	—	Late 18th century	Originally a farmhouse that was extended in 1835, later a private house. It is in ashlar on a chamfered plinth, and has two storeys, quoins, and a green slate roof. The original part has four bays, and the extension has one bay. Both the original part and the extension contain a doorway that has a round-headed architrave with a keystone, impost blocks, and a fanlight. The windows are sashes.
Milestone; 54.84392°N 3.11578°W	—	Late 18th to early 19th century	The milestone was built for the Carlisle to Cockermouth turnpike. It is in sandstone, and has a round top and a curved face. On the face is a cast iron plate inscribed with the distances in miles to Carlisle, Wigton and Cockermouth.
Milestone; 54.84271°N 3.04937°W	—	Late 18th to early 19th century	The milestone was built for the Carlisle to Cockermouth turnpike. It is in sandstone, and has a round top and a curved face. On the face is a cast iron plate inscribed with the distances in miles to Carlisle, Wigton and Cockermouth. On the top is an Ordnance Survey benchmark.
Milestone; 54.85008°N 3.02849°W	—	Late 18th to early 19th century	The milestone was built for the Carlisle to Cockermouth turnpike. It is in sandstone, and has a round top and a curved face. On the face is a cast iron plate inscribed with the distances in miles to Carlisle, Wigton and Cockermouth. On the top is an Ordnance Survey benchmark.
The Ship Inn; 54.84280°N 3.05170°W	—	Late 18th to early 19th century	A stuccoed public house on a chamfered plinth with quoins and a roof of Welsh and green slate. It has two storeys and three bays, and attached to the left are former stables with two storeys and two bays. The main doorway has a pilastered surround with an open pediment and a radial fanlight. The windows are sashes with stone surrounds. In front of the former stables are external steps.
Crofton Bridge; 54.83544°N 3.07873°W	—	Early 19th century	The bridge carries a road, now bypassed by a modern road, over the River Wampool. It is in rusticated sandstone, and consists of a single segmental arch with voussoirs, a string course, pilasters, and a low parapet.
Greenways; 54.84234°N 3.08836°W	—	Early 19th century	An estate house in calciferous and red sandstone with a green slate roof. It has two storeys and three bays that are flanked by hip roofed single-bay wings with polygonal fronts and squared rears. The doorway and the casement windows are in pointed arches.
Greenwood House; 54.84244°N 3.04881°W	—	Early 19th century	A house in calciferous sandstone on a chamfered plinth with quoins and a green slate roof. There are two storeys and three bays. On the front is a porch with two Ionic columns, and the windows are sashes with stone surrounds.
Parton Hall; 54.84765°N 3.12556°W	—	Early 19th century	A farmhouse in red sandstone on a chamfered plinth, with quoins in calciferous sandstone and a green slate roof. There are two storeys and three bays, with a lower two-storey two-bay extension at the rear giving an L-shaped plan. On the front is a porch with two Ionic columns. The doorways and windows, which are sashes, have stone surrounds.
West House; 54.84083°N 3.05274°W	—	Early 19th century	Originally a farmhouse, later a private house, it is in ashlar on a chamfered plinth, with quoins and a green slate roof. There are two storeys and three bays, flanked on both sides by lower two-storey single-bay extensions. The doorway has a radial fanlight and an open pediment, and the sash windows have stone surrounds.
Gate arch and walls, Crofton Hall; 54.83651°N 3.07727°W		1826 (probable)	The gate arch and walls are in calciferous sandstone. The arch is flanked by two pairs of fluted Ionic columns, and has an entablature and a dentilled cornice. The walls are rusticated and have a serpentine shape.
Ice house, Crofton Hall; 54.83948°N 3.08553°W	—	1826 (probable)	The ice house is in sandstone, and consists of a sunken chamber with a vaulted roof. It is approached by steps leading down to an L-shaped passage. The roof is covered with tar and earth.
Stable block, Crofton Hall; 54.83975°N 3.08625°W		1826	The stables are in calciferous sandstone on a chamfered plinth, with quoins, a string course, and a green slate roof. There are two storeys and seven bays. In the central bay are Ionic pilasters and pediments. The bay contains a doorway with a segmental arch and a quoined surround, above which is a Venetian window, and on the roof is a wooden bellcote with a weathervane. The flanking bays have doorways with quoined surrounds, and sash windows in round-headed arches.
South Lodge; 54.83661°N 3.07730°W	—	1826 (probable)	The lodge to the former Crofton Hall is in rusticated calciferous sandstone on a chamfered plinth, and has pilasters, a cornice, and a hipped Welsh slate roof. There are 1 1/2 storeys and two bays, and the windows are sashes.
West Lodge; 54.83648°N 3.07745°W	—	1826 (probable)	The lodge to the former Crofton Hall is in rusticated calciferous sandstone on a chamfered plinth, and has pilasters, a cornice, and a hipped Welsh slate roof. There are 1 1/2 storeys and two bays, and the windows are sashes.
Evening Hill; 54.83797°N 3.04784°W	—	c. 1833	A house in calciferous sandstone on a chamfered plinth with quoins and a green slate roof. It has two storeys, four bays, a double span, and is in Tudor style. On the front is a 1 1/2-storey porch and a doorway with a pointed chamfered surround and a square hood mould. The windows are casements in chamfered stone surrounds with hood moulds.
