= Crofton, Cumbria =

Settlement in Cumbria, England

Coordinates: 54.844846°N 3.081647°W

Crofton
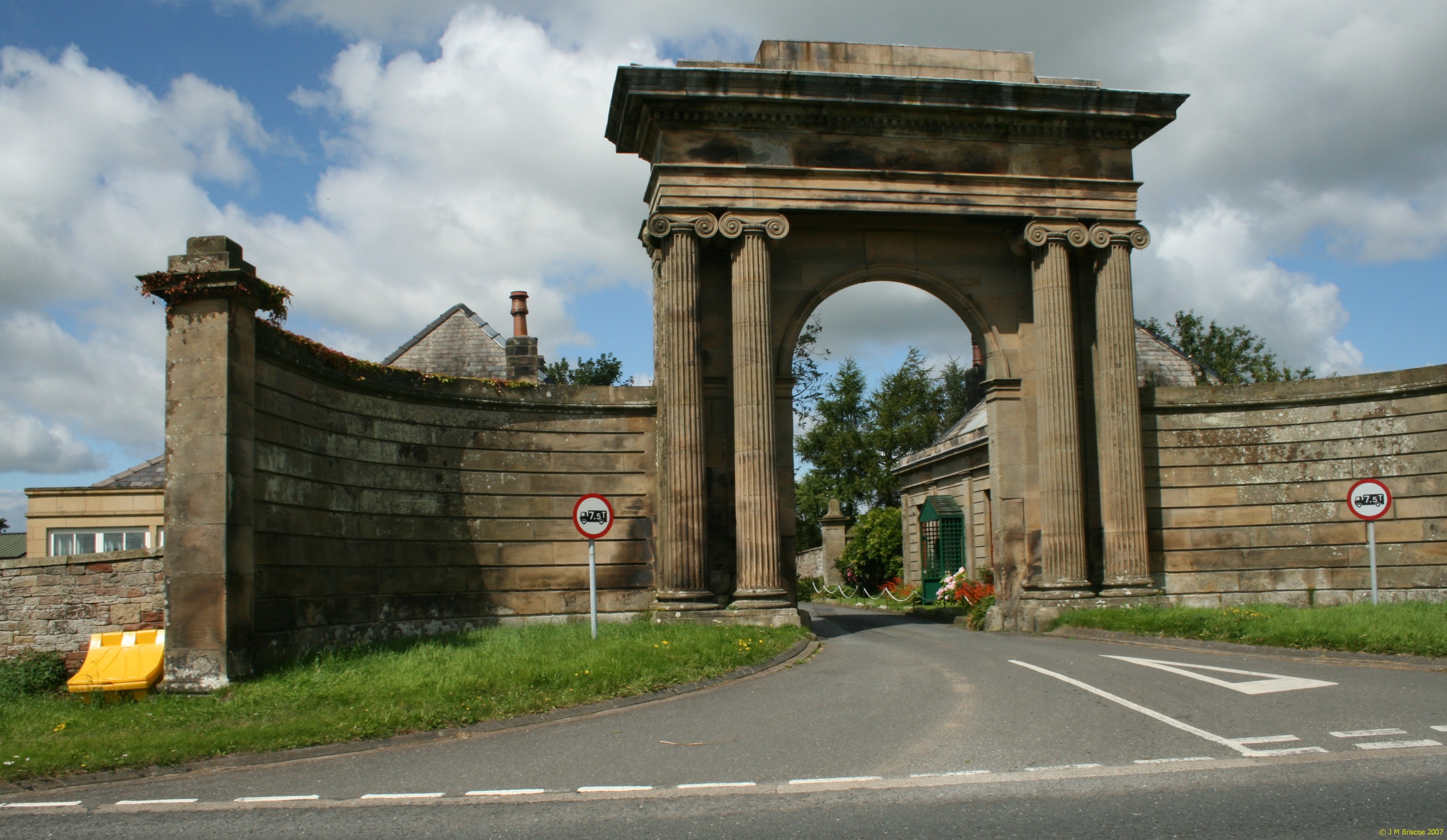
- Archway at the entrance to drive up to the site of Crofton Hall

- Location in Allerdale, Cumbria Location within Cumbria
- OS grid reference: NY305505
  - London: 261 miles (420 km) SSE
- Unitary authority: Cumberland
- Ceremonial county: Cumbria
- Region: North West
- Country: England
- Sovereign state: United Kingdom
- Post town: CARLISLE
- Postcode district: CA5
- Dialling code: 016973
- Police: Cumbria
- Fire: Cumbria
- Ambulance: North West
- UK Parliament: Penrith and Solway

Crofton is an area of Thursby, Cumberland district of Cumbria, England. It is 6.4 miles (10.3 km) west-southwest of Carlisle. In 1870-72 the township had a population of 105.

Historically a part of Cumberland, Crofton was one of three small townships in the centre of the former Parish of Thursby. It was originally called Croft-town, derived from the word Croft, as the town standing upon the Crofts.

Notable landmarks were Crofton Place, the seat of Sir Wastel Brisco, Bart. It also became a surname to John Crofton. Although Crofton Hall was demolished in about 1955–1956, some of the estate buildings remain, and the gateway and pond are notable remnants.

== The Briscos of Crofton ==
Hastings was the home of some of the wealthy Brisco family who had houses in Hastings Old Town and at Bohemia and Coghurst for most of the 19th century.

It seems that the Briscos came to England at the time of the Norman conquests when Brisgau of Swabia provided a company of free lances that accompanied William and the conquest of England.

The brisco shield of arms is a greyhound seizing a hare in its jaws, the motto GRATA-SUME-MANU "grateful hand".

The Crofton estate near Wigton in Cumberland came in to the ownership of Brisco on the marriage of Isold Brisco when the manors of Crofton Whinnow and Dundraw passed to them in the reign of Edward lll in year 1390. It was to remain in the same ownership for 580 years up to December 1935 when the Estate & buildings were eventually sold and finally passed to the Land Settlement Agency.

John Brisco died in 1790 The following details that appeared in a Times advertisement for the sale of the Crofton Estate give a good indication on the land holding at Crofton at the time of its offer for sale in 1908.

The Times 12 May 1908

The Crofton Estate sale by Auction.

7 miles from Carlisle 2 miles from Wigton. Private station on the estate.

Sale by Sir M H Brisco Bart

Total 3706 acres Rent £4502-8-0d --- Mansion & Deer Park

Auction by 1 Lot or in lots as below.

Mansion & Woodland, Home Farm Deer Park .

Reckside Farm

Gillhead Farm.

Sandwitt Farm

Blacksmith Shop at Sandybrow

The Head Farm

Kenkins Co Farm.

Bridge House Farm.

Mid Whinnow Farm.

High Whinnow Farm.

Pow Farm.

Lonnin & Waggonrigg Farm.

Black Brow & Windy Hill Farm

Watchtree Farm.

The Times 12 May 1908 Issue 38644 Page 18 Col E

The Brisco Wealth.

The triennial record of slave ownership from 1830 reveals Wastel Brisco as a major owner of slaves at St Kitts where the record reveals the age names and the now recently available details of compensation paid to Wastel relating to his slaves on St Kitts.

Compensation payments to Wastel Brisco - Slave owner

After keeping slaves was banned in 1807 compensation payments were made in 1833 to the owners of slaves for the loss of their labour.

St Kitts Shadwell Park & Westgate Estate £3,482-17-6d 205 slaves

St Kitts Fleming Salt Pond £2,728-15-7d 165 slaves

St Kitts Priddies Salt Pond £784-11-10d 48 slaves St Kitts Grange £3,613-0-11d 233 slaves

Total £10,607 651 slaves

NB: These payments were made to Wastel Brisco not to the slaves brought over from Africa.

Wastel died 17 November 1862 and probate was awarded to his eldest son Sir Robert Brisco that was recorded to be under £14,000. There was a sale of the possessions from his house at 11 Beaumont Street, Portland Place and his other property at 5 & 82-85 Manchester Square were also sold. The money value converter below offers an idea of the value in money today. The compensation paid to Wastel in 1833 would be worth about £500,000 today.

Thursby

24 February 1772

Prince Crofton, a negro servant at Crofton Hall (home of the Brisco family) baptised. He was buried on 15 May 1781 also at Thursby.

Crofton Estate was taken over by the Land Settlement Association a government initiative to get poorer people involved in agriculture and horticultural production. The LSA estate was composed of Bank End, East Park, West Park, Shaw Wood and Whinnow Land Settlement Small Holdings. The LSA was disbanded in 1974 and some small holders were left destitute, others continued to farm the land as private owners. The LSA small holders were from a variety of backgrounds and places, Irish, Polish, Scottish, Cumbrian and other parts of England.

The stables of the Brisco estate house were used as the LSA headquarters. The lake has recently been reinstated after decades of neglect.

== Gallery ==
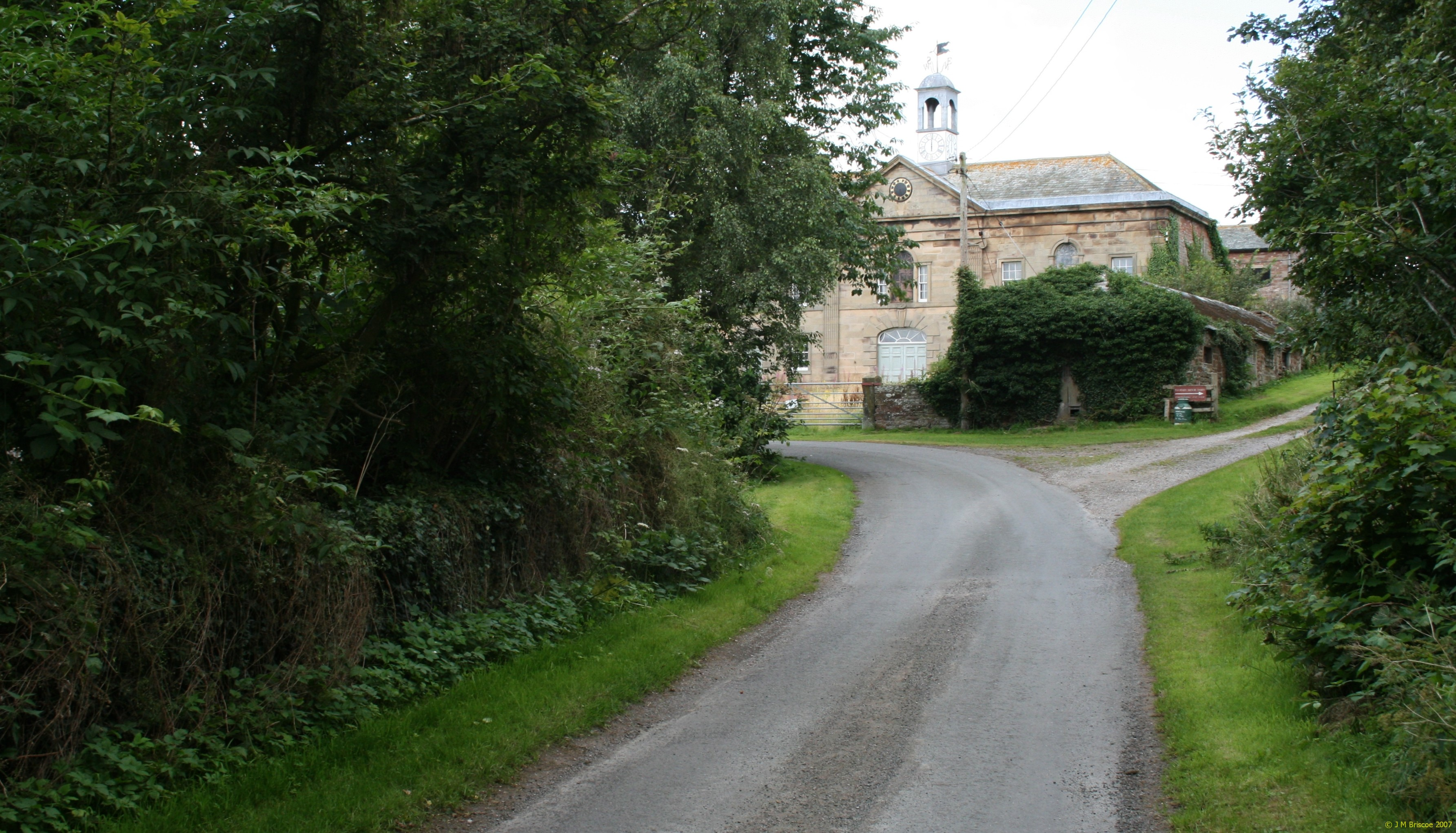
Surviving farm building near site of Crofton Hall

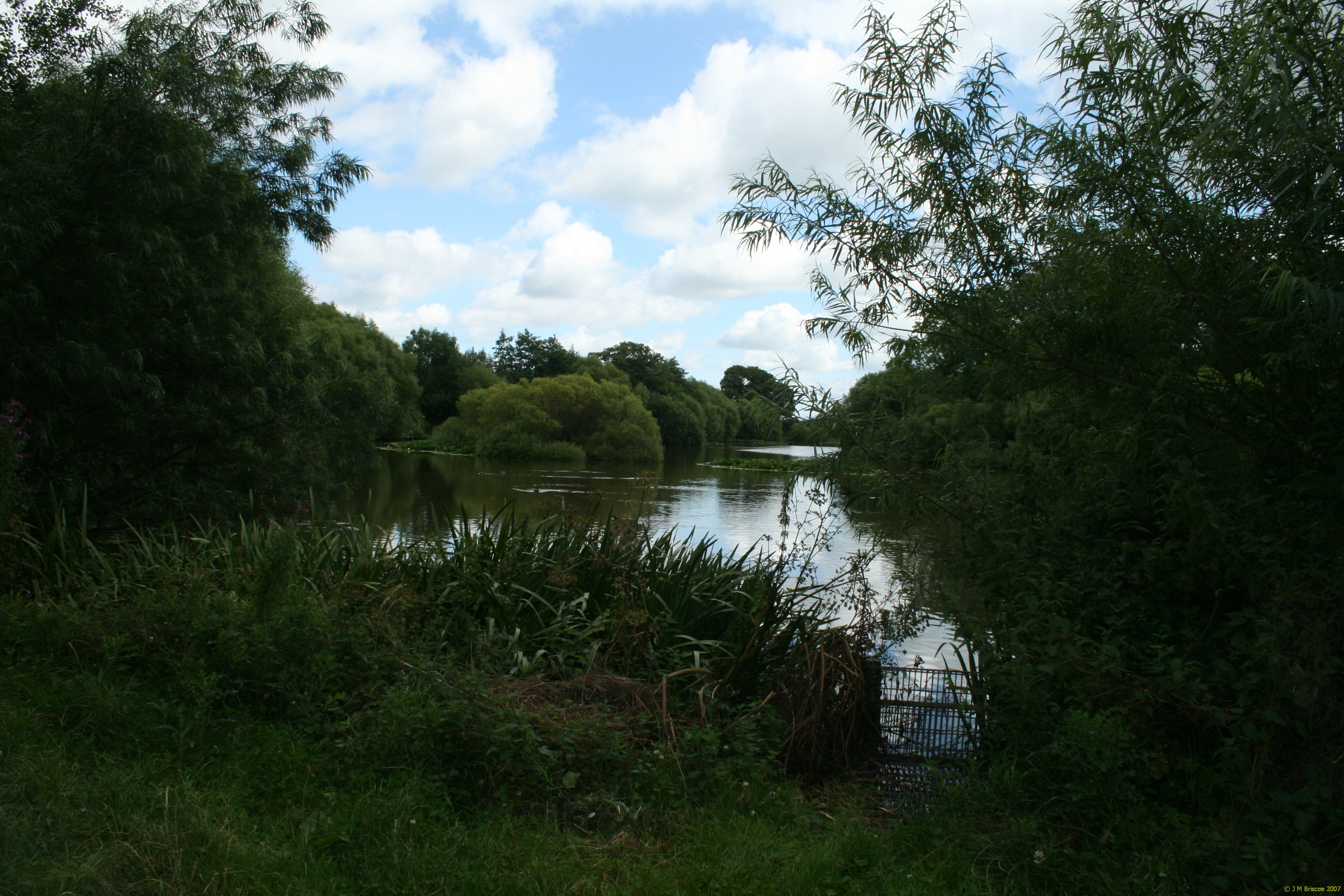
Lake near the site of Crofton hall

== See also ==
- Listed buildings in Thursby
