= Newton Arlosh =

Village in Cumbria, England

Coordinates: 54.885°N 3.245°W

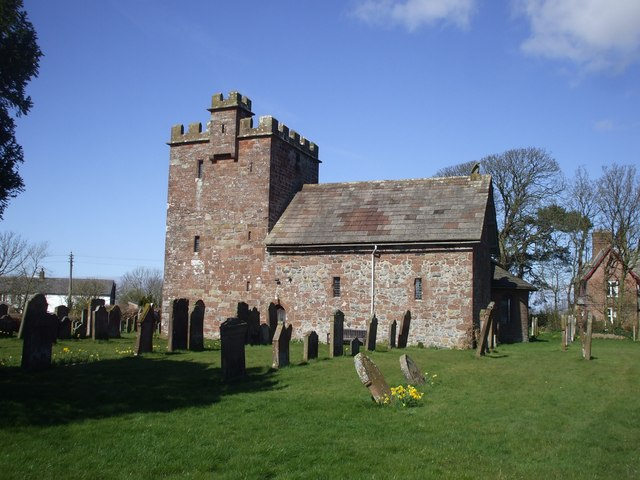
- St. John the Evangelist's Church

- Location in Allerdale, Cumbria Location within Cumbria
- OS grid reference: NY201551
- Civil parish: Holme East Waver
- Unitary authority: Cumberland
- Ceremonial county: Cumbria
- Region: North West
- Country: England
- Sovereign state: United Kingdom
- Post town: WIGTON
- Postcode district: CA7
- Dialling code: 016973
- Police: Cumbria
- Fire: Cumbria
- Ambulance: North West
- UK Parliament: Penrith and Solway

Newton Arlosh is a village in the civil parish of Holme East Waver in Cumbria, England.

== Landmarks ==
St. John the Evangelist's Church is one of the most complete fortified churches in the area. In ruins from the Dissolution until the 19th century, it was repaired and extended in 1844 by Sara Losh. It has been designated by English Heritage as a Grade I listed building.

== Nearby settlements ==
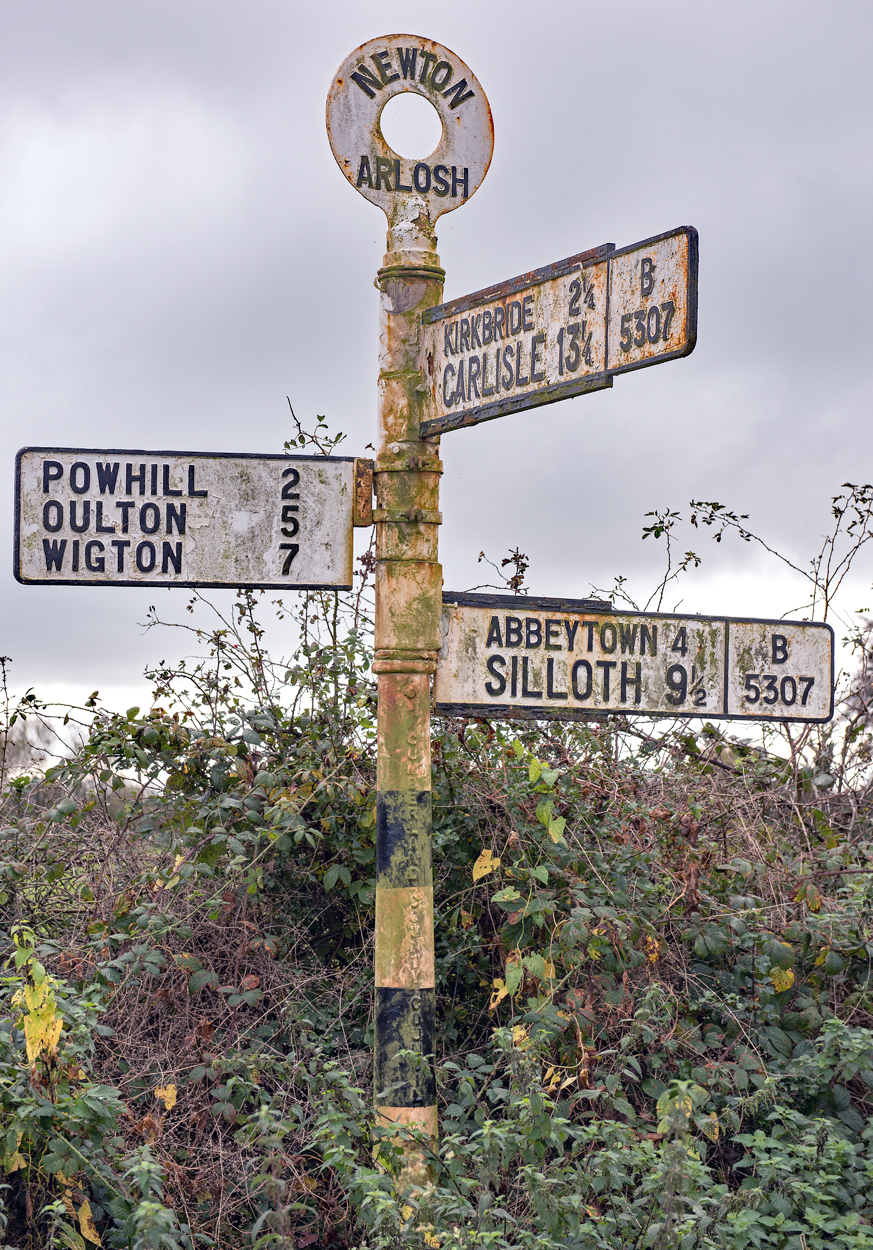
Signpost, Newton Arlosh

Nearby settlements include the city of Carlisle, the villages of Kirkbride and Abbeytown and the hamlet of Raby.

== Other features ==
It is on the B5307 road and is near the channel of the River Waver. There is also Kirkbride Airfield nearby.

== See also ==
- Listed buildings in Holme East Waver
