= Moss Side, Cumbria =

Hamlet in Cumbria, England

Coordinates: 54.862°N 3.255°W

Moss Side
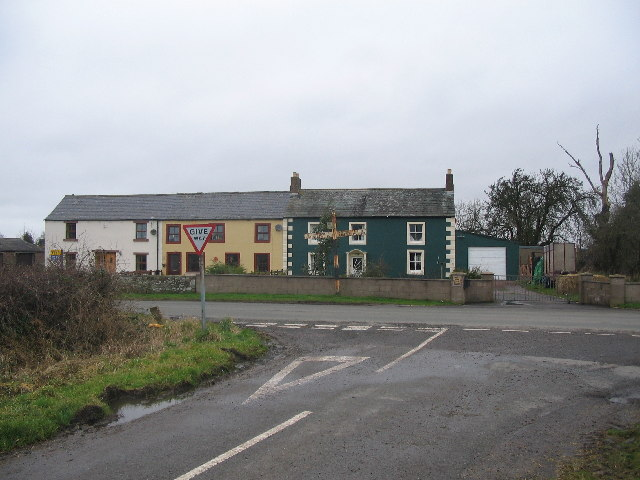
- Houses at Moss Side

- Location in Allerdale, Cumbria Location within Cumbria
- OS grid reference: NY194526
- Civil parish: Holme East Waver
- Unitary authority: Cumberland
- Ceremonial county: Cumbria
- Region: North West
- Country: England
- Sovereign state: United Kingdom
- Post town: WIGTON
- Postcode district: CA7
- Dialling code: 016973
- Police: Cumbria
- Fire: Cumbria
- Ambulance: North West
- UK Parliament: Penrith and Solway

Moss Side is a hamlet on the B5307 road, in the civil parish of Holme East Waver, in the Cumberland district, in the ceremonial county of Cumbria, England. Nearby settlements include the villages of Abbeytown and Newton Arlosh.

== See also ==
- Listed buildings in Holme East Waver
