= Listed buildings in Westward, Cumbria =

Westward is a civil parish in the Cumberland district, Cumbria, England. It contains 38 listed buildings that are recorded in the National Heritage List for England. Of these, four are listed at Grade II*, the middle of the three grades, and the others are at Grade II, the lowest grade. The parish contains the villages of Westward, West Curthwaite, East Curthwaite, and Rosley, and is otherwise rural. Most of the listed buildings are houses, farmhouses and farm buildings; the other listed buildings include a church, public houses, milestones, a hotel, a water tower, a war memorial, and a reservoir inspection chamber.

== Key ==
Grade	Criteria
II*	Particularly important buildings of more than special interest
II	Buildings of national importance and special interest

== Buildings ==
Name and location	Photograph	Date	Notes	Grade
Islekirk Hall; 54.79017°N 3.15329°W	—	Mid 16th century	The house was altered in the late 17th century and in the 19th century. It is in sandstone with a green slate roof, and with a Welsh slate roof on the extension. There are two storeys and seven bays, with a lower two-bay extension to the left. On the front are sash windows, some with architraves, and others with plain stone surrounds, and in the end wall is a three-light mullioned window. The extension contains a doorway with an alternate-block surround. The rear of the house was originally the front, and it contains alterations, including blocked windows.	II*
Clea Hall; 54.77537°N 3.12264°W	—	1633 (probable)	A farmhouse that was later extended, it is roughcast with quoins, an eaves cornice, and a green slate roof. There are two storeys, the later part has four bays, and the earlier part at right-angles to the rear has three bays. The upper floor windows are horizontally-sliding sashes, the ground floor windows in the earlier part are casements in chamfered surrounds, and in the later part they are sashes in plain stone surrounds. The earlier part has a doorway with a chamfered surround, and in the later part is a porch and a door with a fanlight.	II
Meadow Bank Farmhouse; 54.83059°N 3.05410°W	—	1666	Originally probably two houses, it was then a farmhouse, and later a private house. The house is built in clay on a stone plinth, it has been repaired with sandstone, and the roof is thatched. The front is supported by three stone buttresses. There is one storey with an attic and four bays, with a byre to the left. The doorway has an inscribed and dated Tudor arch. There are two sash windows, a plain stair window, two small attic windows, and a casement window. Inside there is a pair of full crucks, an inglenook and a bressumer.	II*
Tracentree Low House; 54.80060°N 3.08876°W	—	Late 17th century	A farmhouse that was altered in 1742, it is rendered on sandstone with a sandstone slate roof. There are two storeys and three bays, with an additional bay over an arch to the right. The doorway has a chamfered surround, above it is a loft door, and the windows are a mix of sashes and casements.	II
Fiddleback; 54.83252°N 3.07992°W		1709	A combined house and barn, its plan that of the body of a guitar. The building is in sandstone on a chamfered plinth, and it has a rounded green slate roof. There are two storeys, three bays, and the attached barn. The doorway has a fluted doorcase with impost blocks, a dentilled cornice, a swan-neck pediment, and a Gothick fanlight. There are blocked round-headed windows on both floors. Above the barn door is a dated lintel, and external steps lead to a first-floor doorway.	II*
Brackenthwaite Farmhouse and barns 54.80720°N 3.10400°W	—	Early 18th century	The farmhouse and adjoining barns have roofs partly of Welsh slate and partly of sandstone slate. The house is roughcast with quoins and an eaves cornice. It has two storeys and two bays. The doorway has a bolection architrave with a panelled frieze and a console-bracketed cornice, and the windows are sashes with architraves. The barns are in sandstone and form a U-shaped plan; they contain a re-set inscribed lintel with a Tudor arched head, doors and ventilation slits. Against a wall is a stepped mounting block.	II
Barns and byres, Clea Hall; 54.77513°N 3.12248°W	—	Early 18th century	The farm buildings are in limestone with some sandstone dressings and with green slate roofs. They have two storeys, they form three sides of a farmyard, and contain various openings, including through arches, doorways, ventilation holes, and windows. Incorporated in the buildings is a re-set lintel that is inscribed and is dated 1633.	II
Stoneraise Place; 54.80052°N 3.13170°W	—	1753	The house was remodelled in the late 19th century. It is in sandstone, it has a roof of Westmorland slate, and there are two storeys. The main doorway on the front has a pilastered surround, a fanlight, and a cornice, and to the right are French windows. At the rear is a doorway with a chamfered surround and an inscribed and dated lintel. The windows are sashes, and at the rear is a stair window.	II
Beech House; 54.83099°N 3.05344°W	—	Late 18th century	The house was extended in the early 19th century. It is rendered and has a green slate roof. There are two storeys and two bays, with a lower three-bay extension to the right. The doorway has a stone surround and a pediment, and the windows are sashes in stone surrounds.	II
Curthwaite House and stable/barn 54.83131°N 3.05304°W	—	Late 18th century	The farmhouse is stuccoed over sandstone and has a green slate roof. There are two storeys and three bays, with a lower two-bay extension to the right. The doorway has an architrave and a pediment, and the windows, which are sashes, also have architraves. At right-angles to the right are the outbuildings, forming an L-shaped plan. They are in sandstone with a corrugated asbestos roof, and contain doorways and external stone steps leading to a loft door.	II
East Woodside, house and barn 54.83125°N 3.06528°W	—	Late 18th century	The farmhouse is stuccoed on a chamfered plinth, and has quoins and a green slate roof. It has two storeys and three bays, a doorway with an architrave, sash windows in stone surrounds, and hood moulds in the lower floor. The house and barn are roughcast with Welsh slate roofs. The house to the right has two bays, a door with a fanlight, and sash windows. The barn to the left has three bays.	II
High Hall and stable 54.78538°N 3.13589°W	—	Late 18th century	The farmhouse and stable are roughcast with a green slate roof. The house has two storeys and three bays, and the doorway and sashes have stone surrounds. The stable to the right has stable doors with a segmental arch, and a louvred vent opening.	II
Longwath and barn 54.79878°N 3.06800°W	—	Late 18th century	The farmhouse and barn are roughcast with green slate roofs. The house has quoins, two storeys, three bays, and a right-angled extension to the right. The doorway has a pediment, and the sash windows are in stone surrounds. The barn, at right-angles to the left, was originally the farmhouse, and has two dated Tudor headed doorways. At the rear are blocked mullioned windows.	II
Slack; 54.82857°N 3.09426°W	—	Late 18th century	A farmhouse that incorporates earlier material, it is stuccoed on a chamfered plinth, and has angle pilasters, an eaves cornice, and a green slate roof. There are two storeys and two bays, with a two-bay extension to the left. The doorway has a stone surround with a broken pediment, and there is a doorway in the extension, also with a pediment. The windows are sashes with architraves in the main part of the house, and stone surrounds in the extension. Inside the house is a bressumer.	II
Stoneraise Farmhouse and outbuildings 54.80046°N 3.14304°W	—	Late 18th century	The farmhouse incorporates parts of an earlier house, including a lintel dated 1677, and it was remodelled in the 19th century. The house and outbuildings are in sandstone and have roofs mainly of slate, and with some stone slate. The house has two storeys and two bays, with a central doorway and sash windows with stone surrounds. At the rear are stair windows and smaller windows. To the west is a barn with a porch, doorways and ventilation slits. The stable to the east has doorways, and a mounting block.	II
West Woodside Farmhouse; 54.83263°N 3.09345°W	—	Late 18th century	A sandstone farmhouse on a chamfered plinth with quoins, and a green slate roof with coped gables. There are two storeys and three bays, a doorway with an architrave and a pediment, and sash windows with stone surrounds.	II
St Hilda's Church; 54.79366°N 3.13196°W		1785–86	The church is built on the site of an earlier church. It is in sandstone on a projecting plinth with quoins and a green slate roof. It has a rectangular plan with three bays an contains triple lancet windows. At the west end is a porch with a pointed arch. The porch rises to form a thin tower with a pyramidal roof. The east end is pedimented.	II
Milestone; 54.80564°N 3.15025°W	—	Late 18th or early 19th century	The milestone was provided for the Carlisle to Cockermouth turnpike road. It is in red sandstone and has a round top and a curved face. On it is a cast iron plate inscribed with the distances in miles to Carlisle and Cockermouth.	II
Milestone; 54.82892°N 3.08677°W	—	Late 18th or early 19th century	The milestone was provided for the Carlisle to Cockermouth turnpike road. It is in red sandstone and has a round top and a curved face. On it is a cast iron plate inscribed with the distances in miles to Carlisle and Cockermouth.	II
Royal Oak Inn; 54.83018°N 3.05401°W		Late 18th or early 19th century	A public house in red and yellow sandstone on a chamfered plinth, with quoins and a tiled roof. There are two storeys and three bays, with a lower two-bay extension to the left. The doorway and sash windows have stone surrounds. On the front is a mounting block.	II
Greenhill Lodge Hotel; 54.79909°N 3.17067°W	—	1810–15	Originally a house, later converted into a hotel, it is in sandstone on a chamfered plinth, and has a string course, a cornice, angle pilasters, and a hipped green slate roof. The building has two storeys and seven bays, and a lower single-bay extension to the right. On the front is a porch with four half-fluted Doric columns and doors under a fanlight. There is a side door to the left with fluted pilasters and a radial fanlight. The windows are sashes in stone surrounds, and at the rear is a staircase window.	II
Street, barn, byres and stables 54.81234°N 3.13433°W	—	1819	The farmhouse and farm buildings are in sandstone with green slate roofs. The house incorporates an earlier building, and has angle pilasters, eaves modillions, a hipped roof, and is in two storeys and three bays with a rear extension. On the front is a Tuscan with a pediment and a fanlight, The windows are sashes with stone surrounds. In the rear wall is a re-set lintel dated 1707. Also at the rear are the farm buildings that form a T-shaped plan and contain various openings, carvings, and an insurance mark.	II
East Curthwaite House; 54.82905°N 3.03891°W	—	Early 19th century	A sandstone house on a chamfered plinth, with quoins, an eaves cornice, and a hipped green slate roof. There are two storeys and three bays, a single-bay extension to the rear, and a further lower single-bay extension, giving an L-shaped plan. On the font is a porch with Doric fluted columns, a plain frieze, and a dentilled cornice. The windows are sashes in stone architraves.	II
Hill House and Hill Cottage; 54.83077°N 3.05367°W	—	Early 19th century	A house and attached cottage in red and yellow sandstone with quoins, modillion eaves, and a green slate roof. They have two storeys, the house has three bays, and the cottage has one. The house has a doorway with a pilastered surround and a dentilled cornice, and the cottage has a plain surround and cornice. All the windows are sashes with stone surrounds.	II
Hope and Anchor Inn; 54.80039°N 3.06195°W	—	Early 19th century	A public house in sandstone with quoins and a hipped green slate roof. There are two storeys and three bays, and a two-bay extension at the rear giving a T-shaped plan. The doorway has a stone surround, a fanlight, and a cornice, and the windows are sashes, also with stone surrounds.	II
Howrigg Farmhouse; 54.81880°N 3.04603°W	—	Early 19th century	The farmhouse is in calciferous sandstone and has quoins and a half-hipped green slate roof. There are two storeys and three bays. The doorway has a porch with two Ionic columns, and the windows are sashes in stone architraves.	II
Jenkin's Cross; 54.82099°N 3.10740°W	—	Early 19th century	A sandstone farmhouse with quoins and a green slate roof. It has two storeys and three bays, and a lower single-bay extension to the right. The doorway has a fanlight and a pointed surround, and above it is a two-light window. The windows in the outer bays are Venetian windows, and in the extension they are sashes with stone surrounds.	II*
Barn, Jenkin's Cross; 54.82114°N 3.10758°W	—	Early 19th century	The barn is in brick with a stone gable wall and a green slate roof. There are two storeys and two bays, and it contains a cart entrance with a loft door above. In the gable wall is a false Venetian window with a circular ventilation hole above.	II
Low Ling; 54.81125°N 3.06602°W	—	Early 19th century	The farmhouse is rendered with eaves modillions and a Welsh slate roof. There are two storeys and three bays. The doorways and windows have pointed heads, and above the door is a fanlight.	II
Milestone; 54.81374°N 3.12958°W	—	Early 19th century (probable)	The milestone was provided for the Carlisle to Cockermouth turnpike road. It is in red sandstone and has a round top and a curved face. On it is a cast iron plate inscribed with the distances in miles to Carlisle and Cockermouth. Above the plate is a bench mark.	II
Raise Lodge and barn 54.79801°N 3.14041°W	—	Early 19th century	The farmhouse is stuccoed, with quoins, an eaves cornice, a parapet, and a green slate roof. It has two storeys, three bays, and a doorway with a pilastered surround, a plain frieze, a cornice, and a fanlight. The doorway is flanked by three-light windows, and in the upper floor are sash windows. The barn to the left is in sandstone, it has an L-shaped plan, and contains ventilation slits.	II
Red Dial Farmhouse; 54.80311°N 3.15938°W	—	Early 19th century	Originally a public house, later a farmhouse, it is in sandstone on a chamfered plinth, and has quoins and a hipped green slate roof. There are two storeys, the main front has three bays, and there are four bays on the left return. The doorway has a Tuscan doorcase and a radial fanlight, and there is a side door, also with a radial fanlight. The windows are sashes in stone surrounds.	II
Rose Bank; 54.83050°N 3.05386°W	—	Early 19th century	A sandstone house with quoins and a stone slate roof, in two storeys and three bays. The doorway and sash windows have stone surrounds. To the right a smaller window has been inserted in a blocked doorway.	II
The Height and former barn 54.81959°N 3.07461°W	—	Early 19th century	A stuccoed farmhouse with quoins and a green slate roof. It has two storeys and three bays, with a lower L-shaped extension to the rear. The doorway has a Tuscan doorcase and a radial fanlight, and the windows, which are sashes, have stone surrounds. The former barn is at right-angles, and has blocked doorways and openings.	II
Rosley House; 54.79688°N 3.05506°W	—	1838	A stuccoed house on a chamfered plinth with angle pilasters and a green slate roof. There are two storeys and four bays, with a single-bay extension to the left and rear giving a T-shaped plan. The porch has four fluted Doric columns, above the door is a fanlight, and the windows are sashes in stone surrounds.	II
Water Tower; 54.83345°N 3.05214°W	—	1843	The water tower was built for the Maryport and Carlisle Railway. It consists of a stone base carrying an iron tank, and has a rectangular plan of one by three bays. Each bay in the base has a round-headed arch separated by pilasters, and there is a doorway, a window, and a plain cornice. The tank has panels with sunken cruciform centres.	II
Reservoir Inspection Chamber; 54.80208°N 3.16107°W	—	1868	The inspection chamber is in sandstone and consists of a gabled cell built into the side of a covered reservoir. It has an iron door with a chamfered surround and a hood mould, and it carries an inscription and the date.	II
Rosley war memorial 54.81874°N 3.06668°W	—	1921	The war memorial is in the churchyard of Holy Trinity Church. It is in sandstone, and consists of wheel-head cross with a rectangular shaft, on a tapering plinth on a base of two steps. On the plinth is an inscription and the names of those lost in the First World War.	II
