= Thursby =

Village in Cumbria, England

Coordinates: 54.842°N 3.050°W

- Village
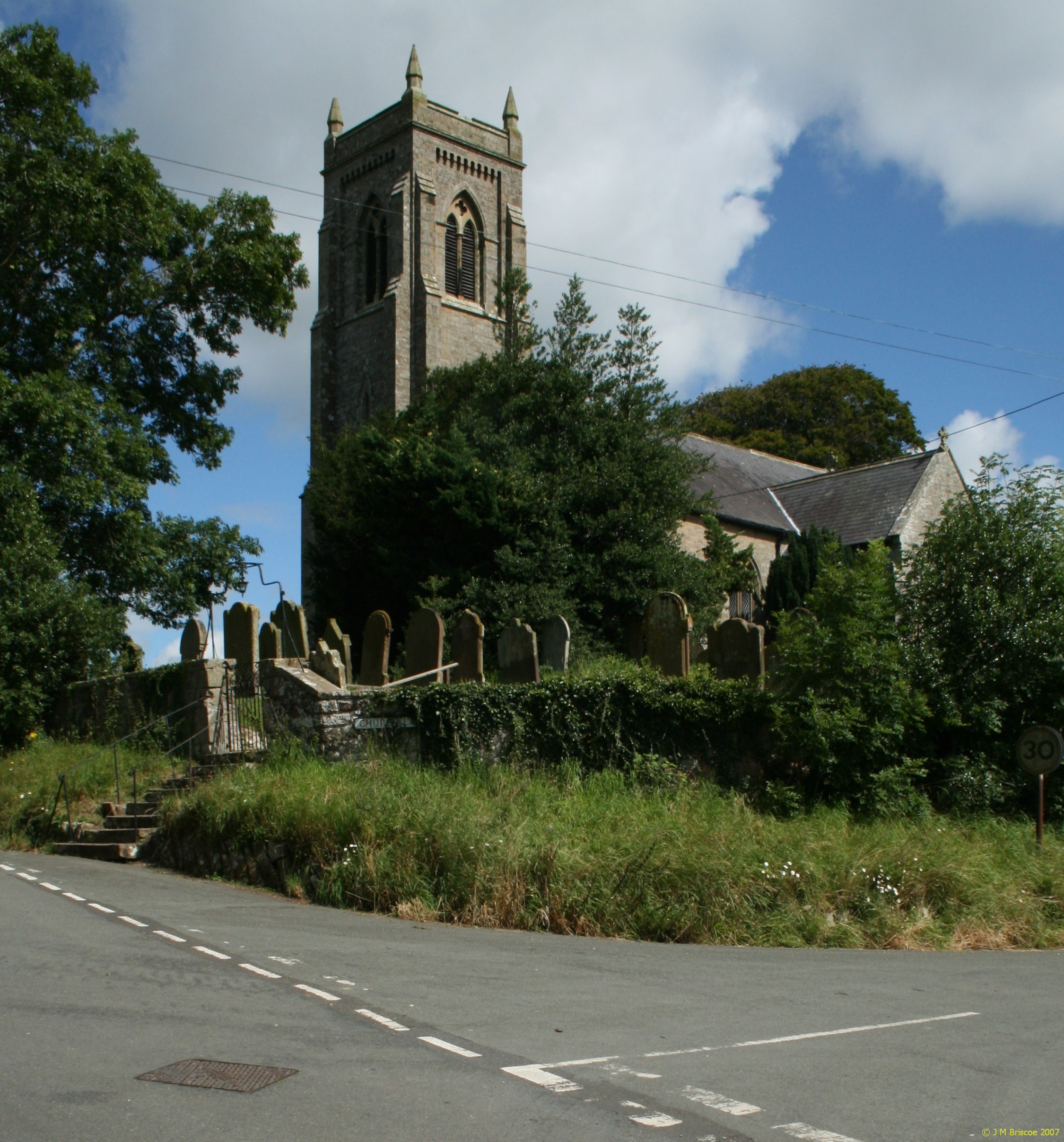
- St Andrew's Church, Thursby

- Location in the former Allerdale district Location within Cumbria
- Population: 1,216 (2011 Census)
- OS grid reference: NY3250
- Civil parish: Thursby
- Unitary authority: Cumberland
- Ceremonial county: Cumbria
- Region: North West
- Country: England
- Sovereign state: United Kingdom
- Post town: Carlisle
- Postcode district: CA5
- Dialling code: 01228
- Police: Cumbria
- Fire: Cumbria
- Ambulance: North West
- UK Parliament: Penrith and Solway

Thursby is a village in the Cumberland district of Cumbria, England. It is near to the city of Carlisle. Thursby was historically part of the county of Cumberland.

== History ==
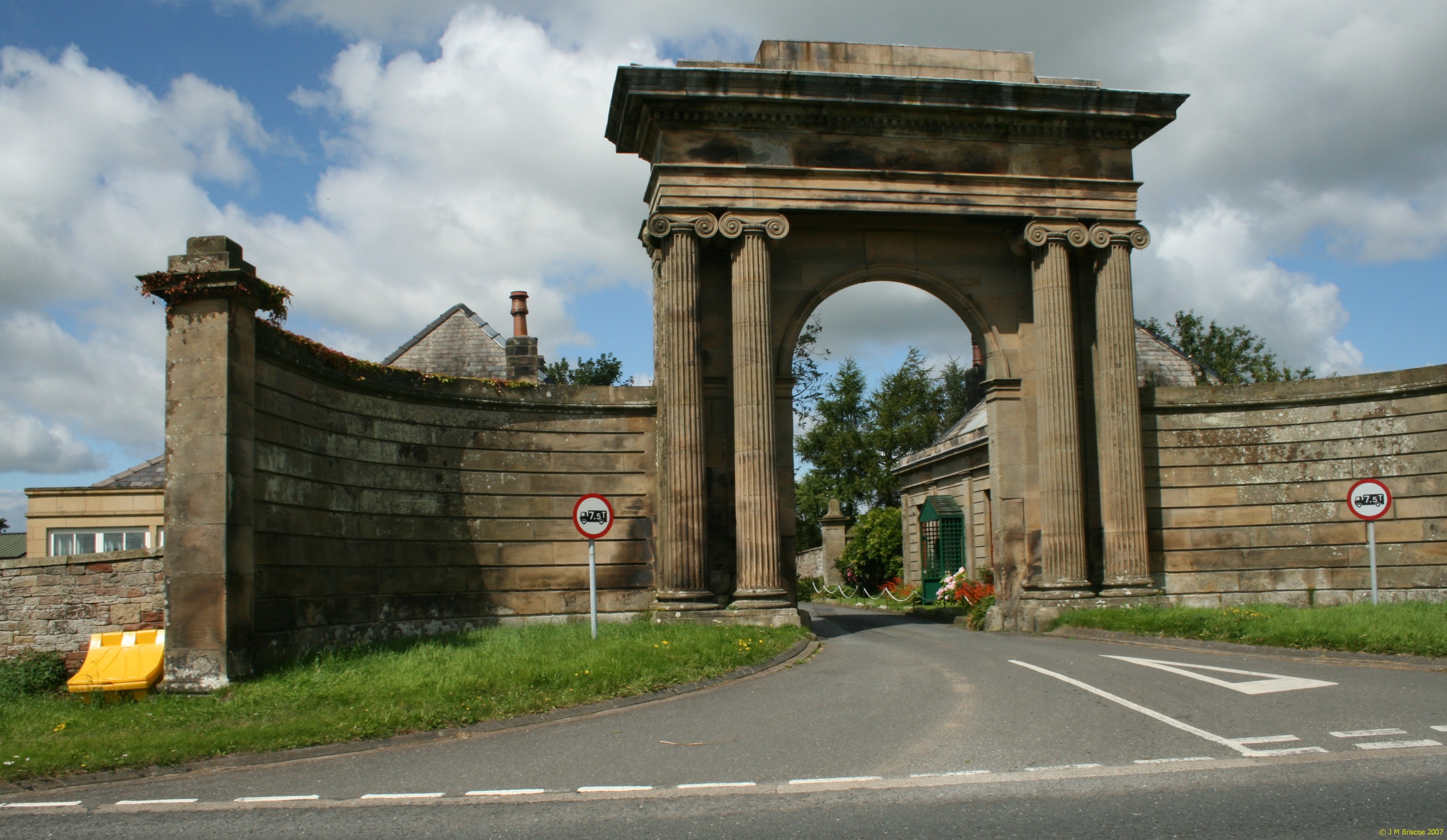
Entrance to Crofton Hall, near Thursby

Thursby lies on an old Roman road, 6 miles south of Carlisle. Thursby takes its old name 'Thor's by' from Thor, the Thunder God of the Saxons, whose temple was reputedly nearby at Kirksteads. The village is predominantly centred on the parish church, a Victorian building built in 1846 and funded by Sir Wastell Brisco of Crofton Hall. The earlier church is reported to have been built by King David I of Scotland.

== Notable people ==
- William Bouch (1813–1876) was a British locomotive engineer who became a manager at Shildon railway workshops.
- Sir Thomas Bouch ( 1822 –1880) was a British railway engineer, born and educated in Thursby. The younger brother of William.

== Politics and governance ==
Thursby is in the Cumberland unitary authority area.

Thursby is in the Penrith and Solway constituency for elections to the House of Commons of the United Kingdom. Since 2024, the local Member of Parliament (MP) is Markus Campbell-Savours from the Labour Party.

== Education ==
Thursby has one primary school, Thursby Primary School.

== Landmarks ==
While Thursby is now largely a commuters' village, there are still many historic buildings, particularly in and around the heart of the village. A useful map can be found on the noticeboard near the village green. Traditional clay-walled buildings are a feature of Thursby, examples of which include Greenwood Cottage on the green and Rosedene Cottage opposite the church on Matty Lonning. There are examples of larger Georgian farmhouses at Holly Lodge and West House in the village centre. A 17th-century farmhouse at Evening Hill has elements of clay structures, with outward buildings and a cart entrance, and lies at the end of the village on the road leading south towards Curthwaite. A little further on is the Tudor Revival Evening Hill House, built in 1833, with twisted candlestick chimneystacks.

== Church ==
St Andrews Church at the west end of Church Lane, built in 1846 is Thursby's main church and is responsible for many organised activities from the parish council. Funded by the Brisco family, on the site of the previous church, it has been said to have been built by David I, King of Scotland.

== Transport ==
There are two major roads that run through Thursby, one being the A595 and the other being the A596. These two roads link Thursby to Carlisle. Curthwaite railway station was situated nearby, closing in 1950.

Since being located in a very rural area the bus service is the only form of transport in Thursby there is limited bus services, the most prominent bus service would be the 38 run by Stagecoach. The 38 bus completes a run from Eden Street, Silloth to Carlisle Bus Station.

The nearest railway stations to Thursby are Dalston (2.5 miles (4 kilometres)) and (Wigton 4.6 miles (7 kilometres)).

== Demographics ==
Thursby has a population of 1,185, increasing to 1,216 measured at the 2011 census.

Over the last 150 years, Thursby's population has clearly aged. However, mortality decline in the late 19th century was mainly due to the reduction of very high infant mortality rates. During the 20th century, declining fertility and improved life expectancy in later life significantly changed age structures. The presence or absence of large numbers of infants dying before their first birthday had little effect on overall age structures.

Population growth in Thursby since 1801

Year	Pop.	±%
1801	409	—
1811	440	+7.6%
1821	515	+17.0%
1841	574	+11.5%

Year	Pop.	±%
1851	591	+3.0%
1881	533	−9.8%
1891	541	+1.5%
1901	496	−8.3%

Year	Pop.	±%
1911	507	+2.2%
1921	495	−2.4%
1931	480	−3.0%
1951	917	+91.0%

Year	Pop.	±%
1961	882	−3.8%

== Social statistics ==
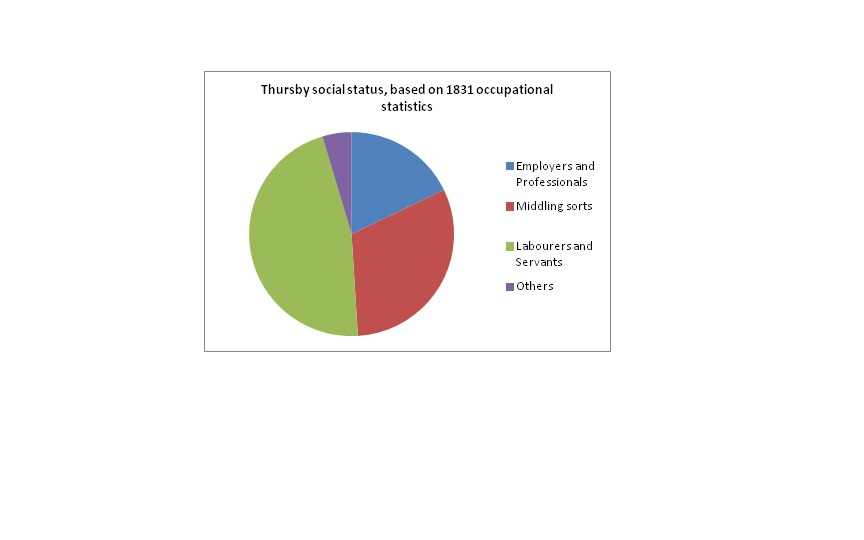
Thursby social status graph

This shows the social status, based on 1831 occupations. We can see that as expected, there are a large proportion of servant and manual labourers (as shown in green). At 1831, the employers would have largely been on agricultural land. However, for a rural village in the 19th century, Thursby does have a large number of middle and upper social classes compared to others. The 1831 census provides information, down to parish level but only shows occupations of males over 20.

== See also ==
- Listed buildings in Thursby
