= Angerton, Cumberland =

Hamlet in Cumbria, England

Coordinates: 54.900°N 3.202°W

Angerton
- Location in Allerdale, Cumbria Location within Cumbria
- OS grid reference: NY229571
- Civil parish: Holme East Waver; Kirkbride
- Unitary authority: Cumberland
- Ceremonial county: Cumbria
- Region: North West
- Country: England
- Sovereign state: United Kingdom
- Post town: Wigton
- Postcode district: CA7
- Dialling code: 016973
- Police: Cumbria
- Fire: Cumbria
- Ambulance: North West
- UK Parliament: Penrith and Solway

Angerton is a village in the civil parishes of Kirkbride and Holme East Waver in Cumbria, United Kingdom. It is just north of the village of Kirkbride, and south of Whitrigg Bridge on the River Wampool.

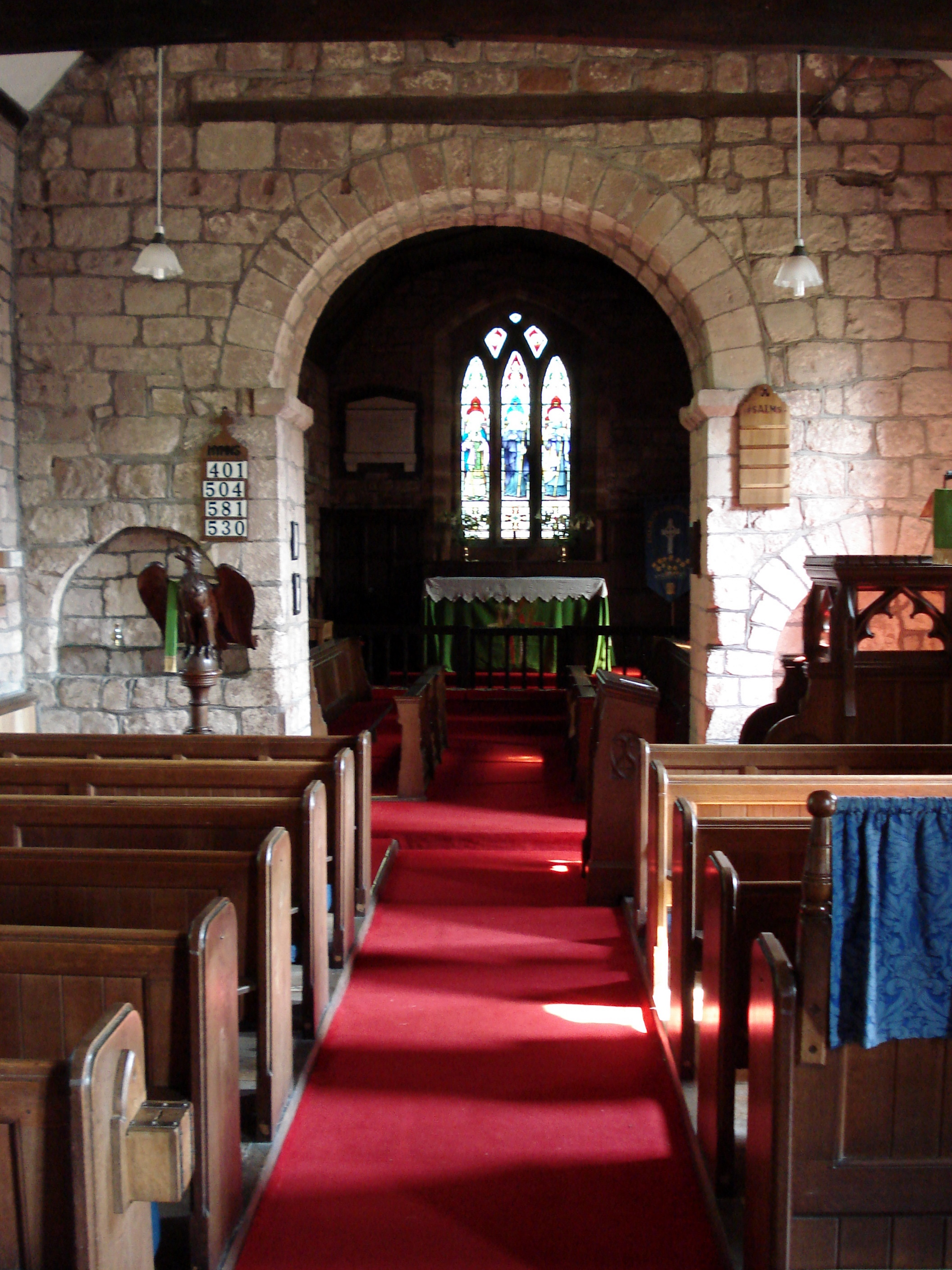
Angerton church, 1 km north of Kirkbride

== See also ==
- Listed buildings in Holme East Waver
