= Listed buildings in Holme East Waver =

Holme East Waver a civil parish in the Cumberland unitary authority area of Cumbria, England. It contains six listed buildings that are recorded in the National Heritage List for England. Of these, one is listed at Grade I, the highest of the three grades, and the others are at Grade II, the lowest grade. The parish contains the villages and settlements of Newton Arlosh, Angerton, Moss Side, and Raby, and is otherwise rural. The listed buildings consist of a fortified church, houses and farmhouses, and associated structures.

== Key ==
Grade	Criteria
I	Buildings of exceptional interest, sometimes considered to be internationally important
II	Buildings of national importance and special interest

== Buildings ==
Name and location	Photograph	Date	Notes	Grade
St John's Church; 54.88550°N 3.25058°W		1303	This was built as a fortified church. Following the Dissolution of the Monasteries it fell into ruin, and was restored and extended in 1894 with the addition of a chancel. The original part is in sandstone and cobbles, and the extension is in sandstone, all with sandstone slate roofs. The church consists of a west tower, a fortified nave, and a chancel at right-angles with an east vestry. The tower has very thick walls, arrowslits, a Tudor arched north window, and a battlemented parapet and turret.	I
Raby Cote and barn 54.85955°N 3.27982°W	—	Mid 16th century	The farmhouse and barn were later altered and extended, and they are in sandstone from Holmcultram Abbey. The house has a re-used chamfered plinth with an inverted inscription, quoins, and a tile roof. There are two storeys and four bays, with a single-bay brick extension to the right. The doorway has a chamfered surround, as do some of the windows, most of which are casements, with one sash window. The barn to the left has two storeys and two bays, and has a green tile roof. It contains plank doors, sculpted stones, and a blocked mullioned window.	II
Barn north of Raby Cote; 54.85976°N 3.27988°W	—	Late 17th century	The barn has rendered clay walls repaired in brick, and a sandstone slate roof. There is one storey and three bays, and a 20th-century porch. To the right is a brick shippon that incorporates sculpted traceried panels from Holmcultram Abbey. Inside the building are three pairs of upper crucks.	II
Knowehill; 54.85277°N 3.27014°W	—	Late 18th century	A brick house on a stone plinth with a green slate roof. It has two storeys and three bays, and the windows are sashes. The doorway has an architrave with a cornice and pediment. In the left return is a carved stone coat of arms, and at the rear are the remains of a mullioned window.	II
Moss Side House and barn 54.86351°N 3.25328°W	—	Late 18th or early 19th century	The farmhouse and barn are stuccoed with a green slate roof. The house is on a chamfered plinth, it has two storeys and three bays, and contains sash windows. The doorway has an architrave with a cornice on consoles and a pediment. The lower barn is at right-angles to the left, and has a rear brick wall containing a large cart entrance.	II
Garden wall, Knowehill; 54.85283°N 3.27023°W	—	Undated	The low wall is in brick and surrounds three sides of the garden. It contains two square gate piers that are panelled and have cornices and pineapple finials.	II
