= Oulton, Cumbria =

Hamlet in Cumbria, England

Coordinates: 54.846°N 3.175°W

Oulton
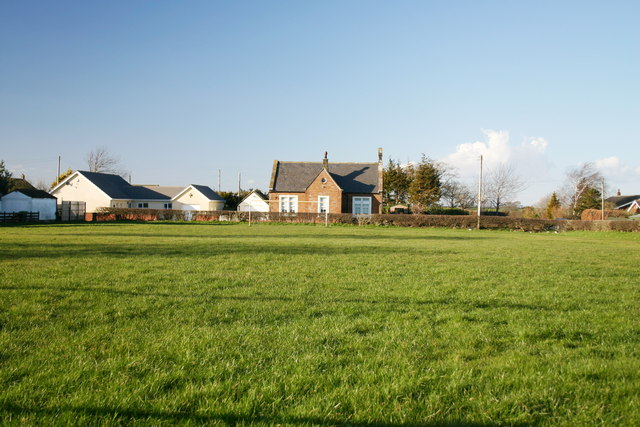
- Playing Field, Oulton

- Location in Allerdale, Cumbria Location within Cumbria
- OS grid reference: NY245507
- Civil parish: Woodside
- Unitary authority: Cumberland
- Ceremonial county: Cumbria
- Region: North West
- Country: England
- Sovereign state: United Kingdom
- Post town: WIGTON
- Postcode district: CA7
- Dialling code: 016973
- Police: Cumbria
- Fire: Cumbria
- Ambulance: North West
- UK Parliament: Penrith and Solway

Oulton is a hamlet and former civil parish, now in the parish of Woodside, near the small town of Wigton, in the Cumberland district of the county of Cumbria, England. In 1931 the civil parish had a population of 271. Oulton was formerly a township in Wigton parish, from 1866 Oulton was a civil parish in its own right until it was abolished on 1 April 1934 and merged into Woodside.
