= Listed buildings in Kirkbride, Cumbria =

Kirkbride is a civil parish in the Cumberland district in Cumbria, England. It contains seven listed buildings that are recorded in the National Heritage List for England. Of these, two are listed at Grade II*, the middle of the three grades, and the others are at Grade II, the lowest grade. The parish contains the village of Kirkbride, and is otherwise rural. The listed buildings consist of a Norman church, houses, farmhouses, farm buildings, and a war memorial.

== Key ==
Grade	Criteria
II*	Particularly important buildings of more than special interest
II	Buildings of national importance and special interest

== Buildings ==
Name and location	Photograph	Date	Notes	Grade
St Bride's Church; 54.90472°N 3.20302°W		12th century	The church was restored and the chancel was virtually rebuilt in 1895–99; the rest of the church has retained many of its Norman features. It is in sandstone, the nave has a roof of sandstone slate, and the rest of the church has green slate roofs. The church consists of a nave, a south porch, a chancel and a vestry. On the west gable is an open bellcote.	II*
Lilac House; 54.90128°N 3.20326°W	—	17th century	The house is rendered, the lower parts of the walls in clay and the upper parts in brick, and the roof in slate. It has two storeys and three bays, with a brick outshut at the rear. Most of the windows are sashes, and there is a cart entrance with an inscribed lintel. The interior has retained a number of original features. Associated with the house, and at the rear, are a brick dairy, a byre and stable in brick stone and clay, and a 16th-century barn in clay and brick and containing a pair of full cruck trusses.	II*
Midtown House; 54.89652°N 3.20328°W	—	Late 17th century	The house is in rendered clay with a roof mainly of Welsh slate and some sandstone slate. It has two storeys and four bays. There is one sash window, and the other windows are casements.	II
Kirkbride House and barn 54.89447°N 3.20260°W	—	1774	The farmhouse and adjoining barn have green slate roofs. The house is in stuccoed brick on a chamfered plinth with quoins. It has two storeys, two bays, and extensions to the left and at the rear. The windows in the main part of the house are sashes, and there is a doorway with a quoined surround, a casement window, and a carriage entry in the extension. The barn to the left is in sandstone. It has oval vents at the front, and at the rear are two carriage arches, a cart entrance, and ventilation slits.	II
Barn, Kirkbride House; 54.89474°N 3.20264°W	—	Late 18th or early 19th century	The barn is in mixed sandstone and split cobbles, and has a roof partly of green slate and partly of sandstone slate. It has two storeys, and contains a central cart entry with a segmental arch, an entrance with a re-set dated lintel, doorways, and ventilation slits.	II
The Lodge, Kirkbride House; 54.89477°N 3.20296°W	—	Late 18th or early 19th century	A stuccoed house with quoins and a hipped green slate roof. It has two storeys and one bay. On the front facing the road are mullioned windows, with three lights in the ground floor and two in the upper floor, and above which are hood moulds.	II
War memorial 54.90454°N 3.20309°W	—	1920	The war memorial is in the churchyard of St Bride's Church. It is in sandstone, and consists of a wheel-head Celtic cross about 2.5 metres (8 ft 2 in) high. The cross has a tapering shaft, a cruciform plinth and a two-stepped base. The head and shaft are decorated with knotwork carvings. On the plinth is an inscription and the names of those lost in the First World War. At the base of the shaft is a brass plate with an inscription and the names of those lost in the Second World War.	II
