= St John the Evangelist's Church, Newton Arlosh =

Coordinates: 54.8855°N 3.2506°W

St John the Evangelist's Church
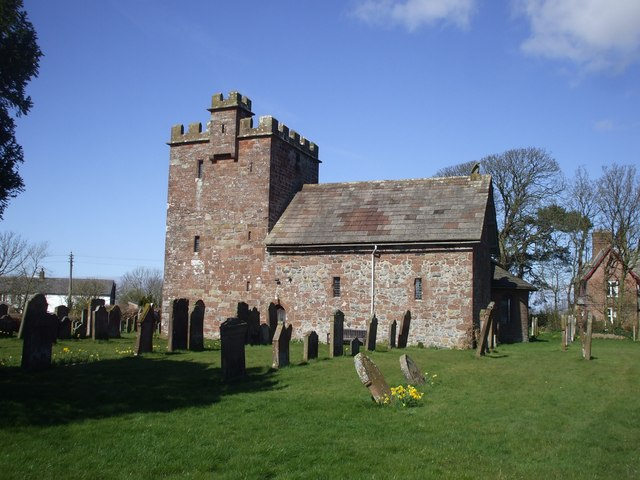
- St John's Church from the south

- Location in Allerdale, Cumbria Location in Cumbria, England
- OS grid reference: NY 198 552
- Location: Newton Arlosh, Cumbria
- Country: England
- Denomination: Anglican
- Website: Newton Arlosh, St John

History
- Status: Parish church
- Founded: 1303
- Founder: Holm Cultram Abbey

Architecture
- Functional status: Active
- Heritage designation: Grade I
- Designated: 1 April 1967
- Architectural type: Church
- Style: Fortified
- Groundbreaking: 1303
- Completed: 1894

Specifications
- Materials: Sandstone with cobbles

Administration
- Province: York
- Diocese: Carlisle
- Archdeaconry: Carlisle
- Deanery: Carlisle
- Parish: St John, Newton Arlosh

Clergy
- Rector: Canon Bryan Rothwell

St John the Evangelist's Church is in the village of Newton Arlosh, Cumbria, England. It is an active Anglican parish church in the deanery of Carlisle, the archdeaconry of Carlisle, and the diocese of Carlisle. It was built as a fortified church, one of a number of such buildings near the Scottish border. It was restored and extended in the 19th century. The church is recorded in the National Heritage List for England as a designated Grade I listed building.

== History ==
St John's was built in 1303 by the monks of nearby Holm Cultram Abbey in Abbeytown. It was granted a licence to crenellate on 11 April 1304. After the Dissolution of the Monasteries in the 16th century, the church remained in ruins until it was restored and extended by Sara Losh in 1844. The extension involved the building of a chancel at right angles to the north of the nave. In 1894 the church was further restored and refurnished.

== Architecture ==
=== Exterior ===
The original church was built in large red sandstone blocks mixed with cobbles and the extension is in red sandstone; all the roofs are covered in sandstone slates, other than the lead on the roof of the tower. Its plan consists of a square fortified west tower with very thick walls, and a two-bay fortified nave. Extending to the north is a two-bay chancel with an apsidal vestry on its east wall. There is no external entrance to the tower; it is entered from the interior of the church at the level of the first floor. Its ground level is barrel vaulted. Inside the tower a stone spiral staircase leads to a chamber on the upper floor containing a fireplace. All the windows in the tower are arrow-slits, some of them original and some from the Victorian restoration. The upper part of the tower has been restored; it has a battlemented parapet and, on the south side a projecting turret on corbels. In the south wall of the nave is a narrow doorway and more arrow-slit windows. The chancel has a round-arched doorway and lancet windows; in the vestry are round-headed windows. Standing on the ridge of the nave roof towards its east end is a carved eagle by Sarah Losh.

=== Interior ===
There is further work by Sarah Losh inside the church. On the east wall of the nave, flanking the position of the original altar are corbels in the shape of rams' heads. Also by her is the lectern with a base of bog oak, and another base in the form of a palm tree that was intended to form part of the pulpit. The oldest item of furniture is the font, brought from Holm Cultram Abbey. It dates from the 13th century and consists of an octagonal bowl with crocketed gables on a fragmentary stem.

== See also ==
- Grade I listed churches in Cumbria
- Grade I listed buildings in Cumbria
- Listed buildings in Holme East Waver
