= George Moore (philanthropist) =

George Moore (9 April 1806 – 21 November 1876) was an English lace merchant and philanthropist. He was born in Mealsgate, Cumberland. Moore accumulated great wealth and built a mansion in Kensington Palace Gardens. He then moved to Mealsgate.

== Life ==
He was the son of John Moore and Peggy Lowes. He was born at Mealsgate, Cumberland, on 9 April 1806. His ancestors were 'statesmen,' who for more than three centuries had lived upon their own land at Overgates. After receiving some education at village schools, Moore, at thirteen, determined to begin life for himself.

It was against family precedent, but at last his father agreed that the boy should be bound apprentice to a draper at Wigton, Cumberland, and the self-reliance which would not allow him to remain a labourer in the country ultimately drove him to London, where he arrived in 1825. His first success was won upon the day after his arrival, when he came off victorious in some wrestling at Chelsea. It was less easy to succeed in business. Work of any kind was for a time sought in vain, and it was to the clannish goodwill of a Cumberland man that he at last owed a modest place with Flint, Ray, & Co., drapers. He made little progress, but, with characteristic resolution, determined to marry Ray's daughter. In 1826, he entered the service of Fisher, Stroud, & Robinson, then deemed the first lace-house in the city, with whom he wore down prejudice by steady industry.

The turning-point in Moore's life came when in 1827, he was made town traveller. He prospered at once. At twenty-one he was sent to the north, and worked with such extraordinary success as to be called 'The Napoleon of Watling Street.' At twenty-three, a rival firm of lacemen, which began in a small room over a trunk shop in Cheapside, and became one of the largest in London, offered Moore a partnership, and the firm became Groucock, Copestake, & Moore. By his own capacity and toil Moore contributed much to its success, and in 1840, after suffering one refusal, he was able to marry Eliza Flint Ray.

In 1841, Moore gave up the active life of a traveller. City work at once told upon him. He tried hunting; and in 1844 went to America for three months.

== Philanthropy ==
In the retirement occasioned by ill-health his religious opinions became pronounced, and on his return from America he plunged into philanthropy with the same zest that he gave to business. A list of the institutions for which he worked shows that he distributed his charity impartially. The first charitable institution in which he interested himself was the Cumberland Benevolent Society. Then he threw himself into the cause of the Commercial Travellers' Schools, for which he secured the interest of Charles Dickens. An article in Household Words for August 1850 moved him to help in establishing the British Home for Incurables. He was the chief promoter of a reformatory for young men at Brixton, the only work, Moore used to say, he had 'begun and given up.' The Warehousemen and Clerks' Schools virtually had their origin on the premises of Moore's firm in Bow Churchyard. The Porters' Benevolent Association also owed its existence to his encouragement.

For the Royal Free Hospital, over the general committee of which Moore presided, he collected large sums of money. He was a governor of Christ's Hospital, a warm friend of such societies as the London City Mission, the Reformatory and Refuge Union, the County Towns' Mission, Field Lane Ragged School, and the Little Boys' Homes, and a liberal donor to Cumberland charities. Much of such work was necessarily public; much was only known after his death. When Paris was opened after the siege, in January 1871, he started at a few hours' notice to carry food and money from the Mansion House Committee.

Moore was indifferent to honours. When elected sheriff of London, he escaped by paying the fine. Six times he refused to stand for parliament, although invitations came from the city of London, from Middlesex, from Nottingham, and elsewhere. The devotion to philanthropy to which Moore at first gave himself as a relief from the cares of business continued to the end of his life. On his way to speak at a meeting of the Nurses' Institution at Carlisle he was knocked down by a runaway horse, and died on the following day, 21 November 1876, in the inn where he had slept on his way to London in 1825.

== Family ==
Moore's first wife, Eliza Flint Ray, died on 4 December 1858; on 28 Nov. 1861 he married Agnes, second daughter of Richard Breeks, who survived him. There were no children of either union.
