= Wigton School =

Defunct boarding school in England

Coordinates: 54.8201°N 3.1815°W

Wigton School (also called Brookfield School or Friends' School) was an independent boarding school on the outskirts of Wigton, Cumbria. The school was opened on 4 September 1815 by the Society of Friends (Quakers) for Cumberland and Northumberland. The initial student intake was 9 boys and 8 girls in premises at Highmoor in existing buildings. These first buildings were leased at an annual rent of 27 guineas.

In 1826, the main school site opened at Brookfield, commissioned by the Society of Friends. A London architect designed the buildings in classic Georgian style.

The school motto was "We seek the truth." The school badge comprised a shield with a green background and diagonal river to represent the school's rural location with a beck (small brook) running through the grounds. On one side of the diagonal was a lamp to represent knowledge. On the other side was a set of scales to represent fairness and tolerance, key Quaker virtues.

The school expanded over the years. Student numbers peaked in the mid-1970s at around 210. Following the peak, student numbers declined and in 1984 the school closed. The school's historic main building was destroyed by fire in 1989.
