= River Wampool =

River in north west Cumbria, England

Coordinates: 54°54′N 3°19′W

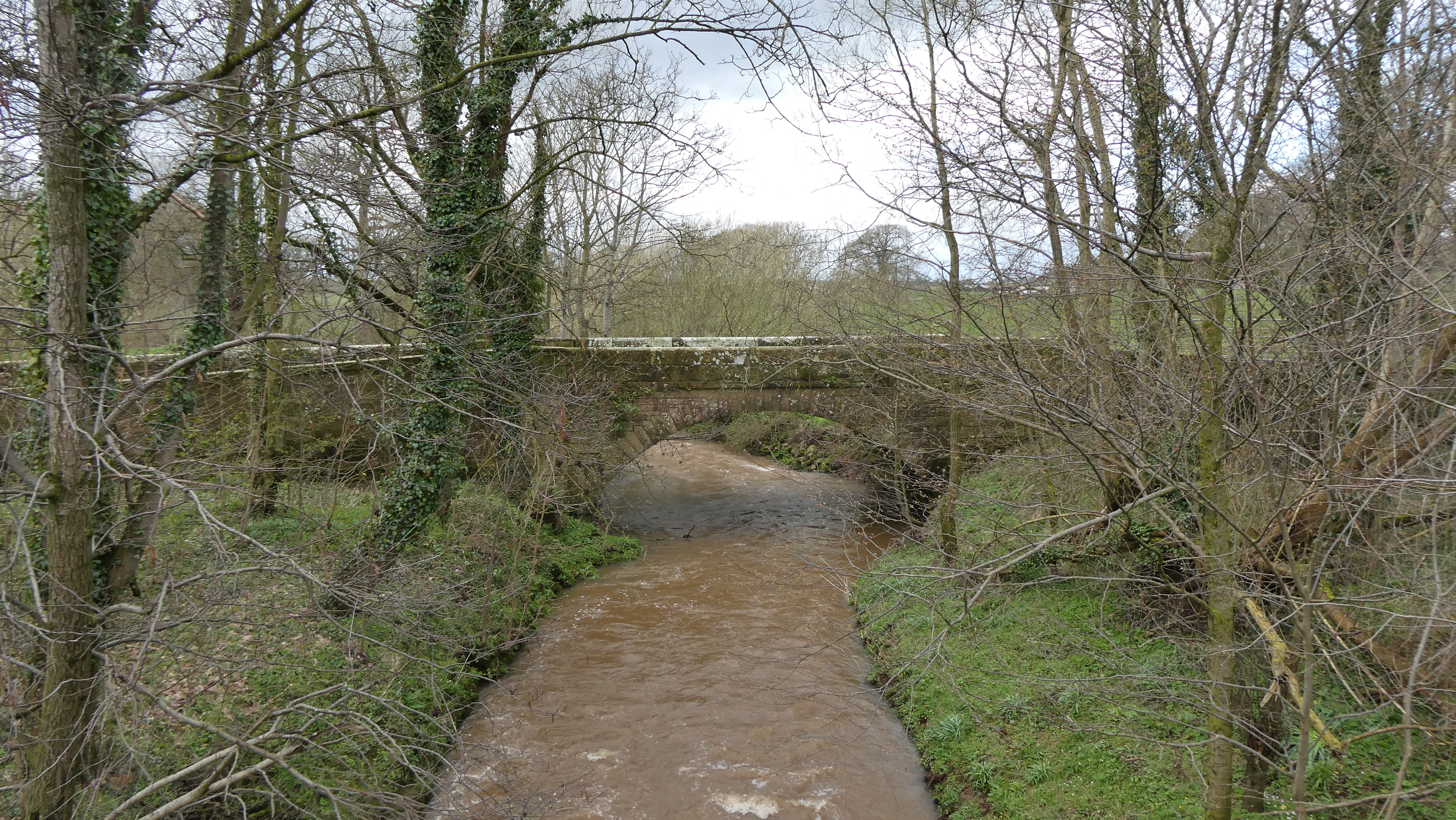
Crofton Bridge, near Thursby, where the old route of the A595 crosses the River Wampool

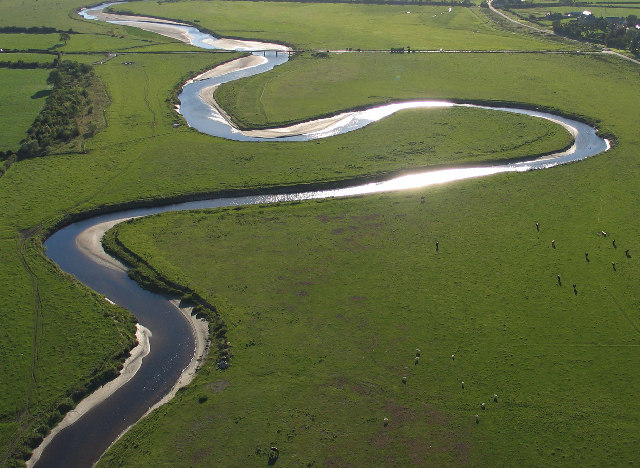
River Wampool near to Whitrigg and Angerton, Cumberland

River Wampool
The Chalk Beck from Wavergillhead becoming the River Wampool north of Chalkfoot. The inset map shows the former Allerdale district.

The River Wampool is a river flowing through north western Cumbria in England. It is in the Waver and Wampool (or Wampool and Waver) catchment which includes the towns of Silloth and Wigton.

== Headwaters ==
The river is formed at Chalkfoot near East Curthwaite, where water from Cardew Mires flowing in Gill Beck is joined by the Chalk Beck. Chalk Beck rises close to Wavergillhead and runs north, meeting Iron Gill and proceeding through a wooded clough to Chalkfoot, helping define the western edge of Inglewood Forest.

== River Wampool ==
The Wampool initially flows westwards from Wampool Bridge near West Curthwaite to Crofton Bridge near Thursby. From here on it powered a number of watermills. The mill race from Woodside Mill joins shortly after Crofton. The Wampool is joined by Whinnow Beck at Micklethwaite, with Whins Mill and then Moorhouse Mill nearby. The next tributary is the Pow Beck. The Wampool continues northwards through Gamelsby, which has another mill. At Biglands, it is joined by Bampton Beck, and continues to Wampool farm and grange.

== Estuary ==
The Wampool flows northwards towards Angerton, where it bends westwards. From this point, it runs parallel to the River Eden, demarcating the Bowness peninsula. It then joins the River Waver to form Moricambe Bay and flows past Anthorn into the Solway Firth.

For much of its length the river forms the boundary between the parishes of Woodside to the west and Thursby and Aikton to the east and north.
