= Westward, Cumbria =

Village and civil parish in Cumbria, England

Coordinates: 54.792°N 3.133°W

Westward
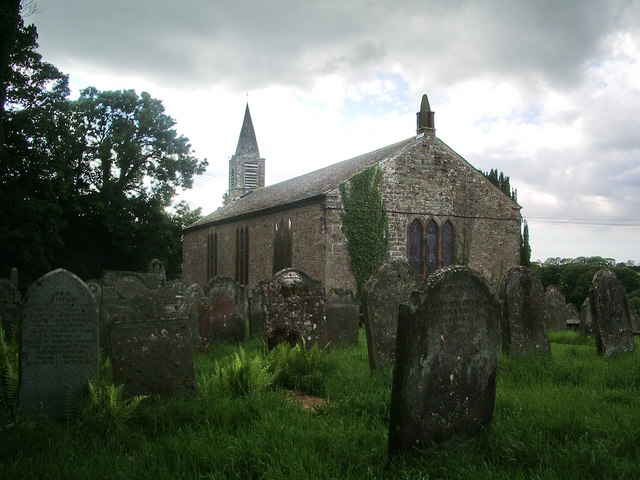
- St. Hilda's Church, Westward

- Location in Allerdale, Cumbria Location within Cumbria
- Population: 838 (2011)
- OS grid reference: NY272446
- Civil parish: Westward
- Unitary authority: Cumberland
- Ceremonial county: Cumbria
- Region: North West
- Country: England
- Sovereign state: United Kingdom
- Post town: WIGTON
- Postcode district: CA7
- Dialling code: 016973
- Police: Cumbria
- Fire: Cumbria
- Ambulance: North West
- UK Parliament: Penrith and Solway

Westward is a small village and civil parish in the English county of Cumbria. It had a population of 814, at the 2001 census, increasing slightly to 838 at the 2011 Census. Westward is located on the south side of the Wiza Beck. It is 3.3 miles (5.3 km) to the south of the town of Wigton. Administratively it forms part of the district of Cumberland.

The Nobel prize winner William Henry Bragg was born in Westward in 1862.

== See also ==
- Listed buildings in Westward, Cumbria
