= Raby, Cumbria =

Hamlet in Cumbria, England

Coordinates: 54.853°N 3.266°W

Raby
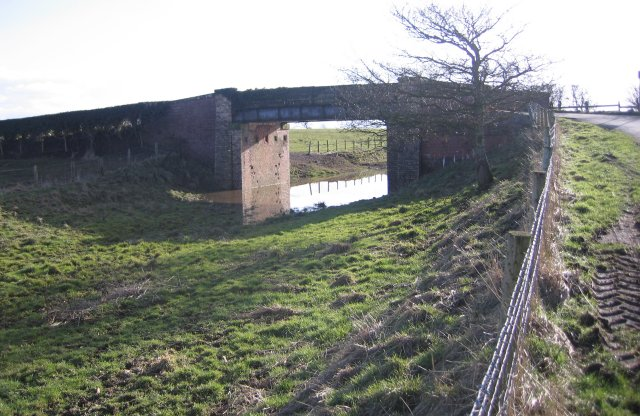
- Disused railway bridge near Raby Cote

- Location in Allerdale, Cumbria Location within Cumbria
- OS grid reference: NY187516
- Civil parish: Holme East Waver
- Unitary authority: Cumberland
- Ceremonial county: Cumbria
- Region: North West
- Country: England
- Sovereign state: United Kingdom
- Post town: WIGTON
- Postcode district: CA7
- Dialling code: 016973
- Police: Cumbria
- Fire: Cumbria
- Ambulance: North West
- UK Parliament: Penrith and Solway

Raby is a small hamlet in the civil parish of Holme East Waver in Cumbria, England.

== See also ==
- Listed buildings in Holme East Waver
