= Brisco baronets =

Title in the Baronetage of Great Britain

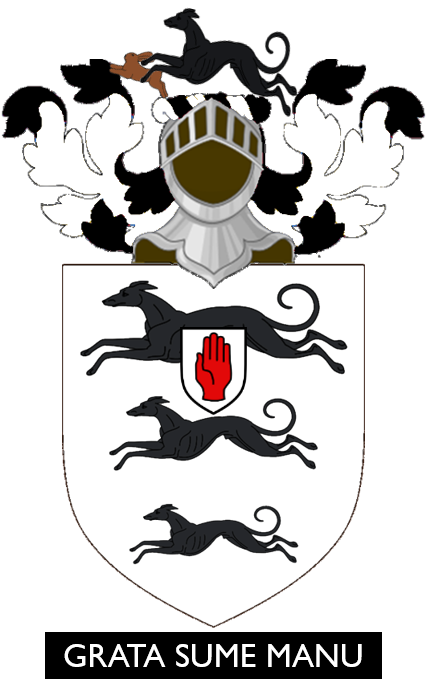
Arms: Argent three Greyhounds courant in pale Sable; Crest: A Greyhound courant Sable seizing a Hare proper; Motto: Grata Sume Manu (Take with a grateful hand)

The Brisco Baronetcy, of Crofton Place in the County of Cumberland, is a title in the Baronetage of Great Britain. It was created on 11 July 1782 for John Brisco, with remainder, failing male issue of his own, to his brother Horton and the heirs male of his body. Brisco had earlier served as High Sheriff of Cumberland.

The title descended from father to son until the death of his great-great-grandson, the fifth Baronet, in 1922. The late Baronet was succeeded by his first cousin, the sixth Baronet. He died childless and was succeeded by his first cousin, the seventh Baronet. This line of the family failed on the death of the latter's son, the eighth Baronet, in 1995. The late Baronet is believed to have been succeeded by his first cousin, the presumed ninth and (as of 2007) present holder of the title who lives in Southland, New Zealand. Campbell Howard Brisco is the son of Gilfrid Rimington Brisco, younger brother of the seventh Baronet. However, he has not successfully proven his succession to the baronetcy and is therefore not on the Official Roll of the Baronetage, with the baronetcy considered dormant.

== Brisco baronets, of Crofton Place (1782) ==
- Sir John Brisco, 1st Baronet (1739–1805)
- Sir Wastell Brisco, 2nd Baronet (1778–1862)
- Sir Robert Brisco, 3rd Baronet (1808–1884)
- Sir Musgrave Horton Brisco, 4th Baronet (1853–1909)
- Sir Hylton Ralph Brisco, 5th Baronet (1871–1922)
- Sir Aubrey Hilton Brisco, 6th Baronet (1873–1957)
- Sir Hylton Musgrave Campbell Brisco, 7th Baronet (1886–1968)
- Sir Donald Gilfrid Brisco, 8th Baronet (1920–1995)

The heir presumptive is the present holder's cousin Campbell Howard Brisco (born 1944).

== See also ==
- Briscoe baronets

Baronetage of Great Britain
Preceded by Affleck baronets	Brisco baronets of Crofton Place; 11 July 1782	Succeeded by Apreece baronets
