= East Curthwaite =

Hamlet in Cumbria, England

Coordinates: 54.8293°N 3.0387°W

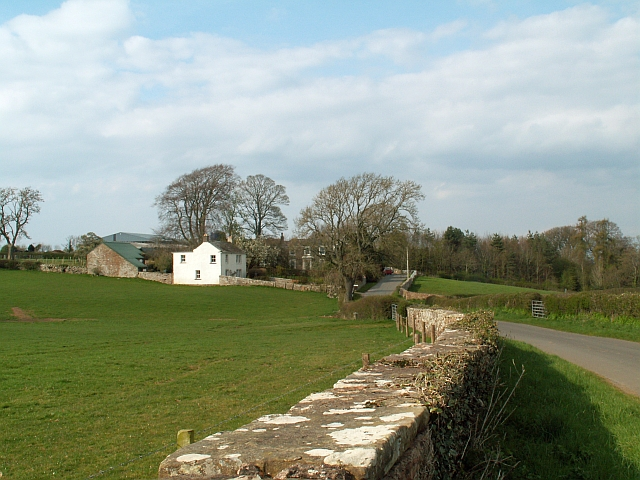
- East Curthwaite

- Location in Allerdale, Cumbria Location within Cumbria
- OS grid reference: NY332487
- Civil parish: Westward
- Unitary authority: Cumberland
- Ceremonial county: Cumbria
- Region: North West
- Country: England
- Sovereign state: United Kingdom
- Post town: WIGTON
- Postcode district: CA7
- Dialling code: 01228
- Police: Cumbria
- Fire: Cumbria
- Ambulance: North West
- UK Parliament: Penrith and Solway

East Curthwaite is a hamlet in Cumbria, England. Meaning "Clearing near or belonging to a church", it was documented as "Kyrkthwate" in 1272.

== See also ==
- Listed buildings in Westward, Cumbria
