= Kirkbride, Cumbria =

Coordinates: 54.897°N 3.203°W

Kirkbride
- Village and parish
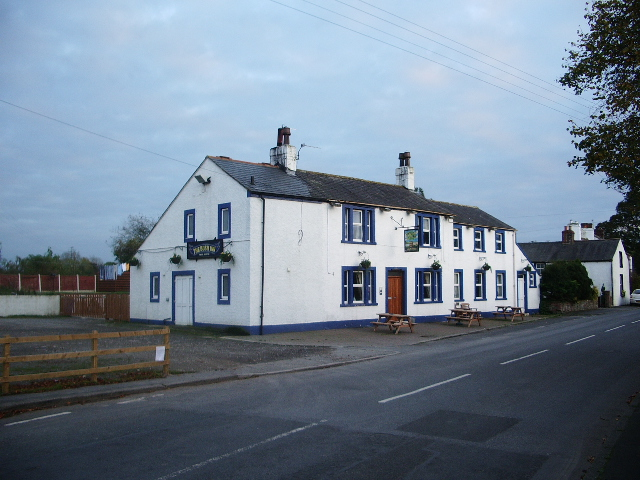
- The Bush public house, Kirkbride

- Location in the former Allerdale district Location within Cumbria
- Population: 489 (2011)
- OS grid reference: NY228564
- Civil parish: Kirkbride
- Unitary authority: Cumberland
- Ceremonial county: Cumbria
- Region: North West
- Country: England
- Sovereign state: United Kingdom
- Post town: WIGTON
- Postcode district: CA7
- Dialling code: 016973
- Police: Cumbria
- Fire: Cumbria
- Ambulance: North West
- UK Parliament: Penrith and Solway

Kirkbride is a village and civil parish in northern Cumbria, England. The civil parish population at the 2011 census was 489.

== History ==
Significant ancient historical remains close to Kirkbride include the Kirkbride Roman fort and Hadrian's Wall some miles to the north. Both Hadrian's Wall in this western reach and the Kirkbride fort were originally of turf and timber construction, probably due to the paucity of available stone in this part of England around the Solway Plain; the Wall was later rebuilt in stone. In 122 AD, the Romans constructed Hadrian's Wall, which incorporated the Vallum earthwork. It is thought that Kirkbride Fort predates Hadrian's Wall and was built as part of the Stanegate frontier. The Wall was designed primarily to prevent entrance by small bands of raiders or unwanted immigration from the north, not as a fighting line for a major invasion according to Stephen Johnson.

LIDAR photography has proved the existence of three Roman roads linking Kirkbride Roman fort with other Roman forts. The primary road is a continuation of the Stanegate road west from Carlisle (Roman Luguvalium) to Kirkbride. From there a road led north-east to the nearby fort of Coggabata on Hadrian's Wall at Drumburgh, on the shores of the Solway Firth. The third, longer, road led roughly south-south-east to the large Roman fort at Old Carlisle, just south of Wigton. The road did not follow the modern direct route to Wigton, but instead skirted the east side of the River Wampool past Biglands and Gamelsby, and then turned south.

More recent history includes construction of the Church of St Bride; first recorded in 1189, it is surrounded by the area designated as Kirkbride Roman Fort. The Kirkbride war memorial also stands in the grounds of the church.

== Governance ==
Kirkbride is part of the parliamentary constituency of Penrith and Solway.

For Local Government purposes it is in the Cumberland unitary authority area.

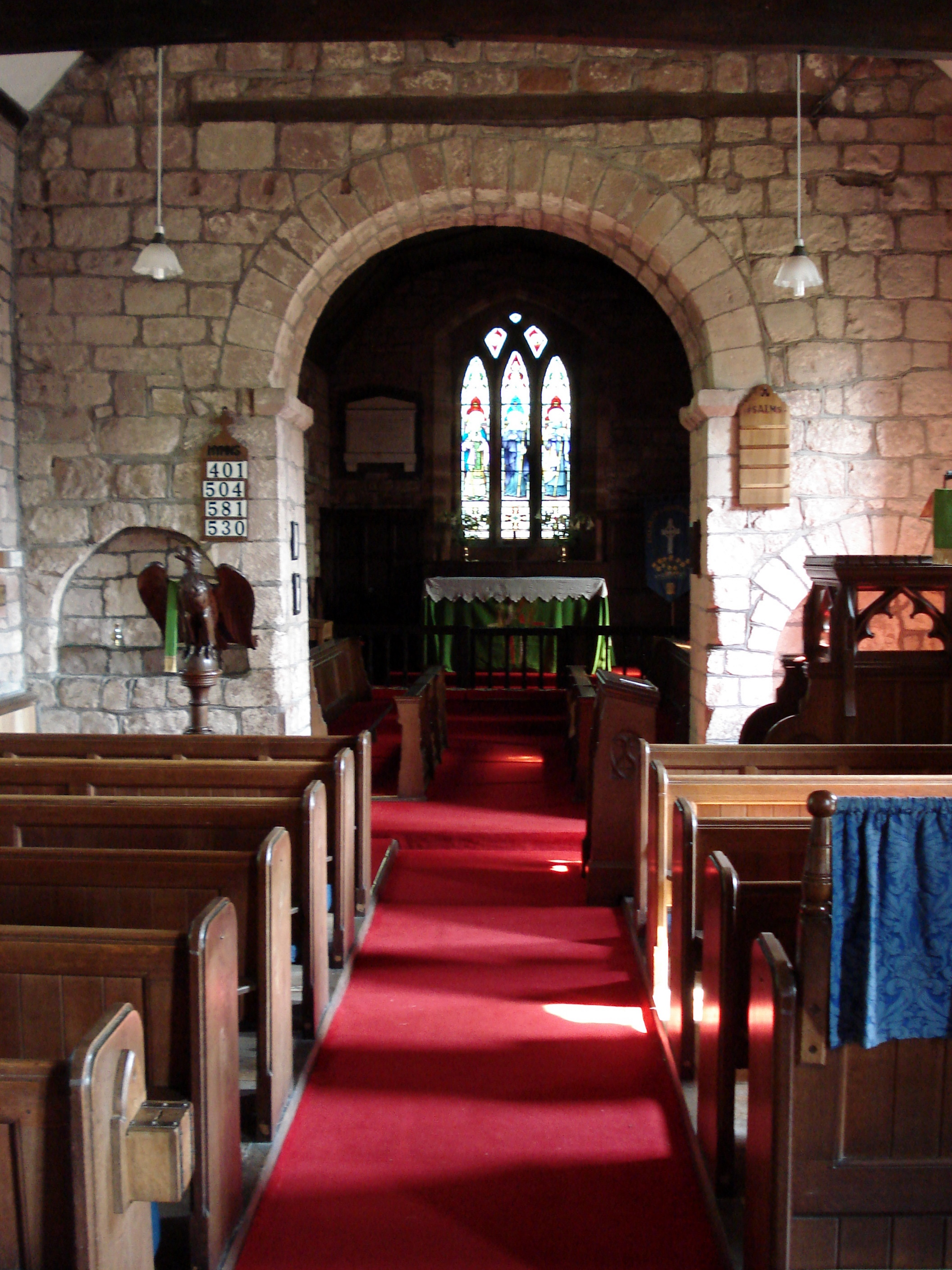
St Bride's Church, Angerton, 1 km north of Kirkbride

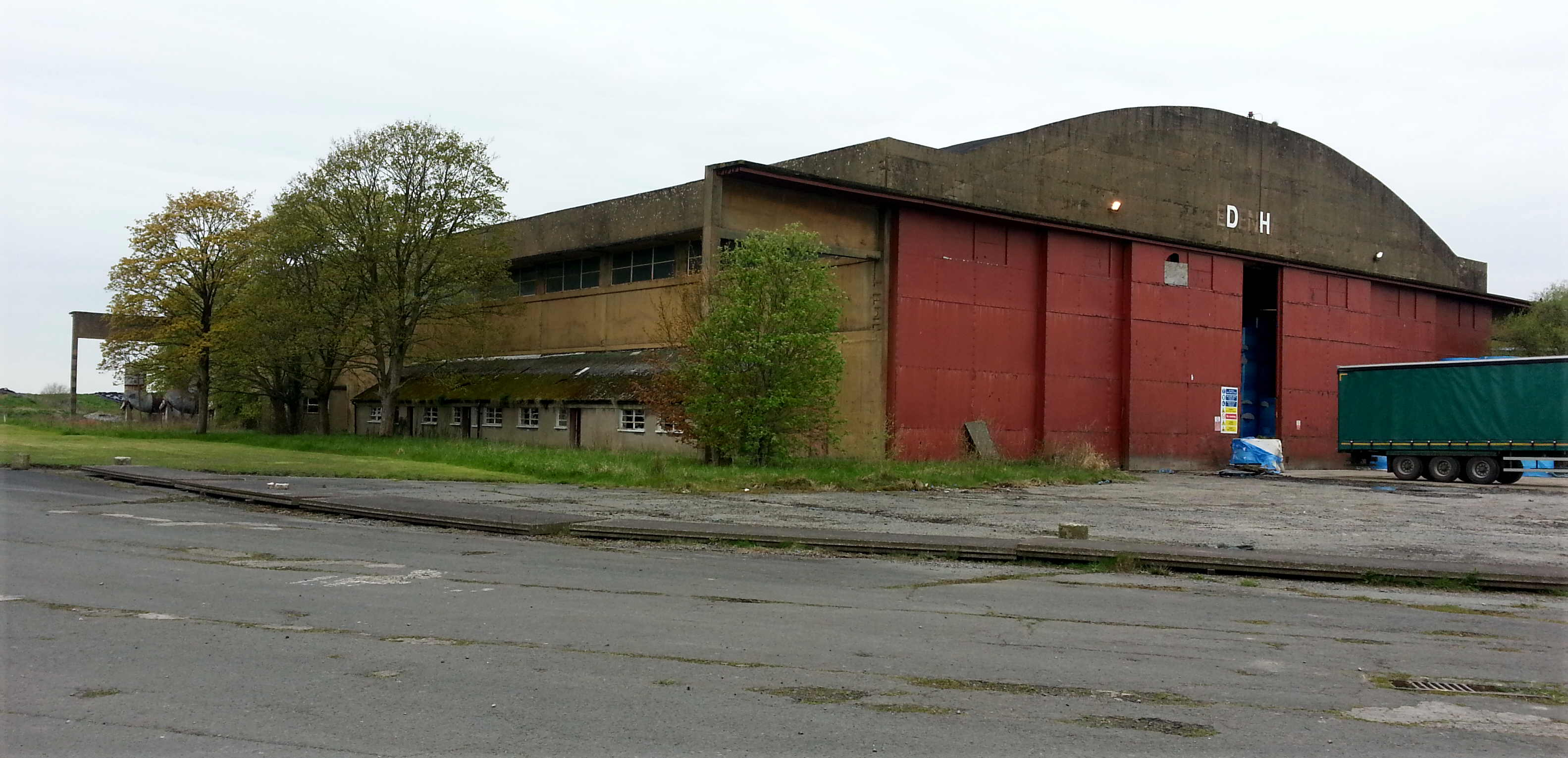
Hangar at former RAF Kirkbride, Cumbria.

== Transport ==
The village is served by two buses: the 93 to Carlisle via Anthorn and Bowness-on-Solway and the 71 to Wigton or Carlisle via Kirkbampton.

== See also ==
- Listed buildings in Kirkbride, Cumbria
- Stanegate
