= Wigton =

Market town in Cumbria, England

Coordinates: 54.823°N 3.159°W

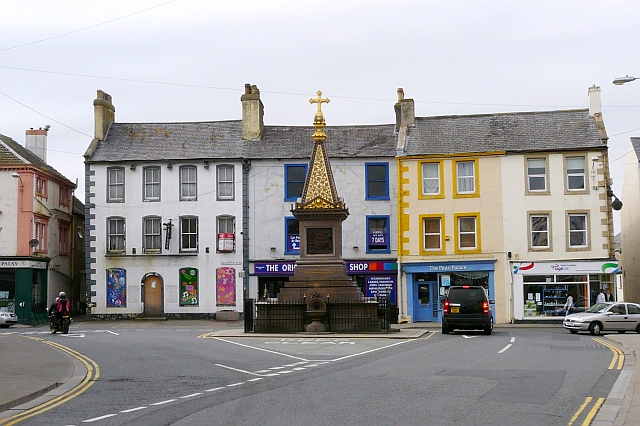
- Market Place and Moore Memorial Fountain

- Location within Cumbria
- Population: 6,013 (Parish, 2021); 5,395 (Built up area, 2021)
- OS grid reference: NY255481
- Civil parish: Wigton
- Unitary authority: Cumberland
- Ceremonial county: Cumbria
- Region: North West
- Country: England
- Sovereign state: United Kingdom
- Post town: WIGTON
- Postcode district: CA7
- Dialling code: 016973
- Police: Cumbria
- Fire: Cumbria
- Ambulance: North West
- UK Parliament: Penrith and Solway

Wigton is a market town in the Cumberland district of Cumbria, England. It lies just outside the Lake District. Wigton is at the centre of the Solway Plain, between the Caldbeck Fells and the Solway coast. It is served by Wigton railway station on the Cumbrian Coast Line, and the A596 road to Workington. The town of Silloth-on-Solway lies 12 miles (19 km) to the west, beyond Abbeytown.

== Toponymy ==
Wigton is "Wicga's tūn". "Wicga" is an Old English pre-7th-century personal name meaning "a beetle" (as in "earwig"), while "tūn" is Old English for a demarcated plot, a "homestead" or "village", so Wigton is "the hamlet belonging to Wicga".

== History ==
Wigton lies on the River Wampool and Wiza Beck (beck being a dialect word meaning "brook" or "stream" – from the Old Norse bekkr). It is an ancient settlement and evolved from a pre-medieval street plan, which can still be traced today.

The Romans had a cavalry station, Maglona, known locally as Old Carlisle, just to the south of the town with a large vicus (civilian settlement) associated with it. The fort was approximately half-way between Carlisle and the Roman settlement of Derventio (now known as Papcastle), linked by the Roman road that is now the A595. From this location they could react to incursions from north of Hadrian's Wall, using the Roman road to sally east or west before traversing northward across the countryside.

In the period of late antiquity after Roman rule, Wigton was within the native British kingdom of Rheged. Probably of Anglian origin, Wigton was an established settlement in the Kingdom of Northumbria long before the Normans arrived in the area. Wigton and most of then Cumberland were a part of Scotland in 1086 when the Domesday Book was written for William I, so are not included in it.

The Norman invaders created the County of Carlisle (later called Cumberland), building Carlisle Castle in Carlisle in 1092 for its administrative centre. Odard de Logis became William II's Sheriff of Carlisle and was made Baron of Wigton about 1100 AD when it became a Norman barony. Wigton gained its market charter in 1262. The de Logis barons changed their surname to de Wigton around 1208 but the male line of the family died out in 1348, so the manor passed to the Barony of Cockermouth. Although the town's layout is generally Anglian or medieval, its architecture is mainly in the 18th-century Georgian style which remains largely intact.

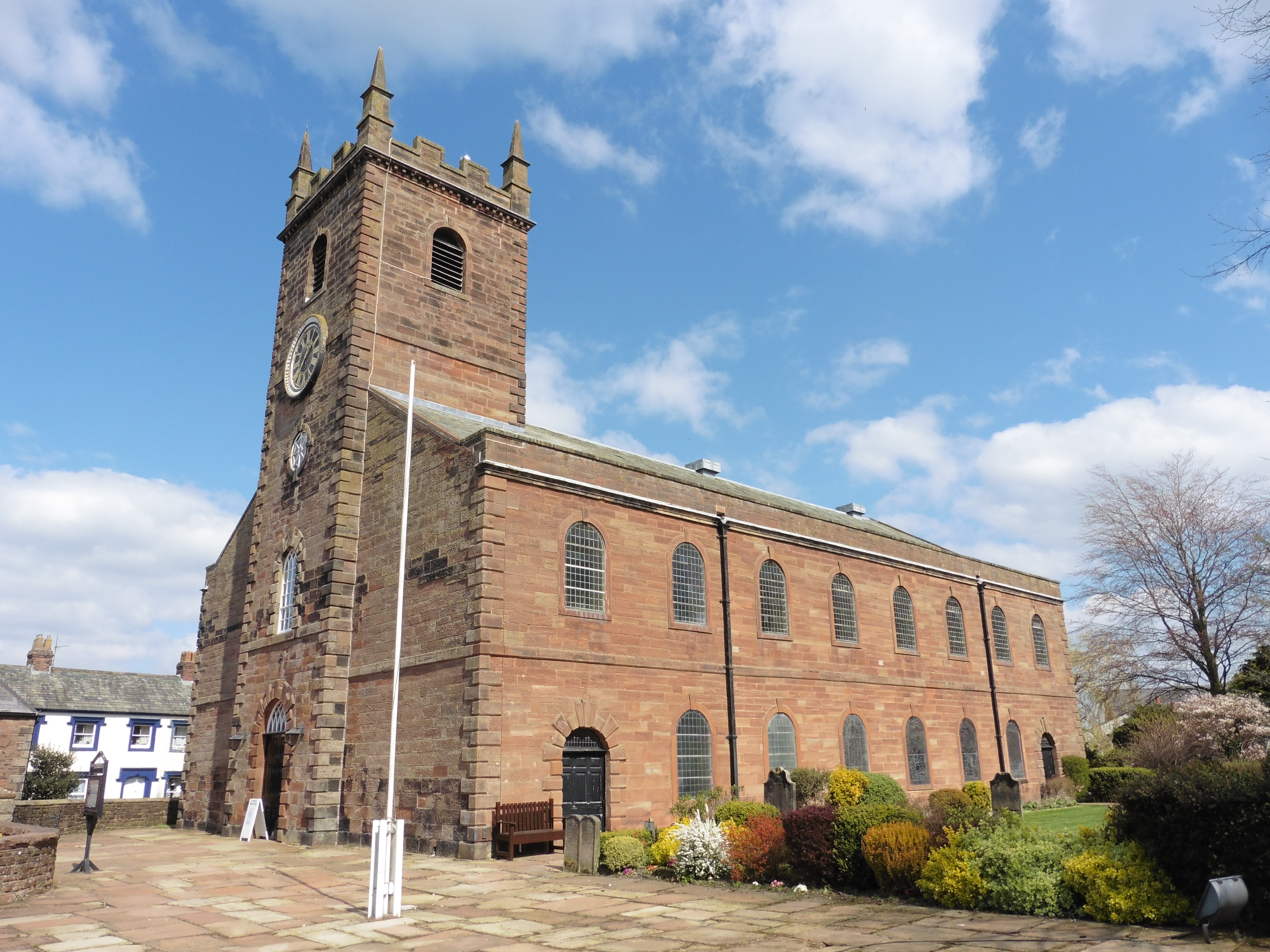
St Mary's Church

St Mary's Church dates from 1788, but there was a church on this site from the 12th century.

The population in 1841 was 4,738.

In the middle of Wigton's market place is the George Moore Memorial Fountain built in 1872; of particular interest are the four bronzes around the fountain, the work of the Pre-Raphaelite sculptor Thomas Woolner. These depict the "four acts of mercy".

A private secondary school, the Wigton School (also called the Friends' School or Brookfield) was founded to the north of the town in 1815 with an initial enrolment of eight pupils. After reaching a maximum enrolment of 250 or so in the 1970s and 1980s, the school closed, following sustained drop-off in student numbers and, finally, damage by fire.

The appearance of the church owes much to the vision of Rev John Ford (father of the broadcaster Anna Ford) in the 1950s, when he had gravestones laid flat and the interior painted in the present colours. Highmoor Bell tower, built during the Industrial Revolution and completed in 1887, played tunes three times daily.

=== Fiddleback Farm ===
Fiddleback Farm, a Grade II* listed building, is situated approximately 100 yards to the west of the A595. Its site was used, amongst other purposes, for supplying provisions and materials from "Old Carlisle" to Hadrian's Wall. It is thought that the farm site was the first "Mile Station" from Old Carlisle. Regarding Fiddleback, the building was originally fortified to repel invading Celts. It later become a place of worship. Constructed in the shape of a fiddle, it was built about 300 years ago, along with two other buildings in the shape of musical instruments by a wealthy and eccentric land-owner. During renovation works, the skeleton of a cat was discovered above one of the old entrance doorways. Another Grade II listed building, constructed in the shape of an accordion, still stands. A third, built in the shape of a banjo, was demolished for unknown reasons in the 1920s.

== Geography ==
Wigton today is a market town, with livestock auctions being held regularly at Hopes Auction Company. The main employer is Innovia Films.

The town has its own secondary school, called The Nelson Thomlinson School, which is a comprehensive with close links to the Innovia factory.

In 2004 the town was the first settlement in the United Kingdom to enforce a curfew on teenagers under the age of 16. It was in place for two weeks, and its aim was to reduce the amount of vandalism in the town centre. It followed nightly vandalism campaigns, which included smashed shop fronts, as well as intimidation of elderly members of the community. The curfew attracted national attention, with the local secondary school receiving visits from agencies such as Sky News. It had some effect, with less vandalism taking place ever since.

== Governance ==
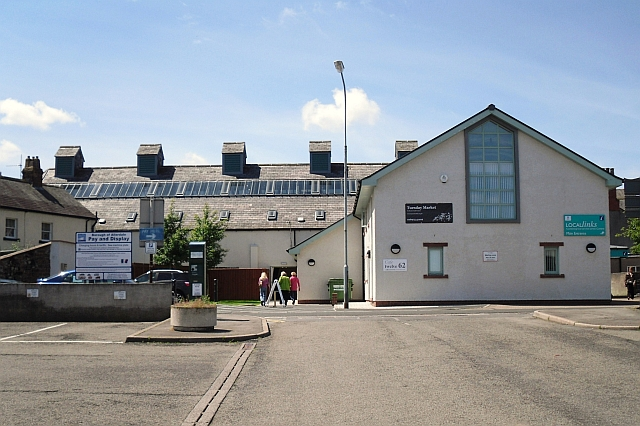
Market Hall

There are two tiers of local government covering Wigton, at parish (town) and unitary authority level: Wigton Town Council and Cumberland Council. The town council is based at the Market Hall on Church Street.

=== Administrative history ===
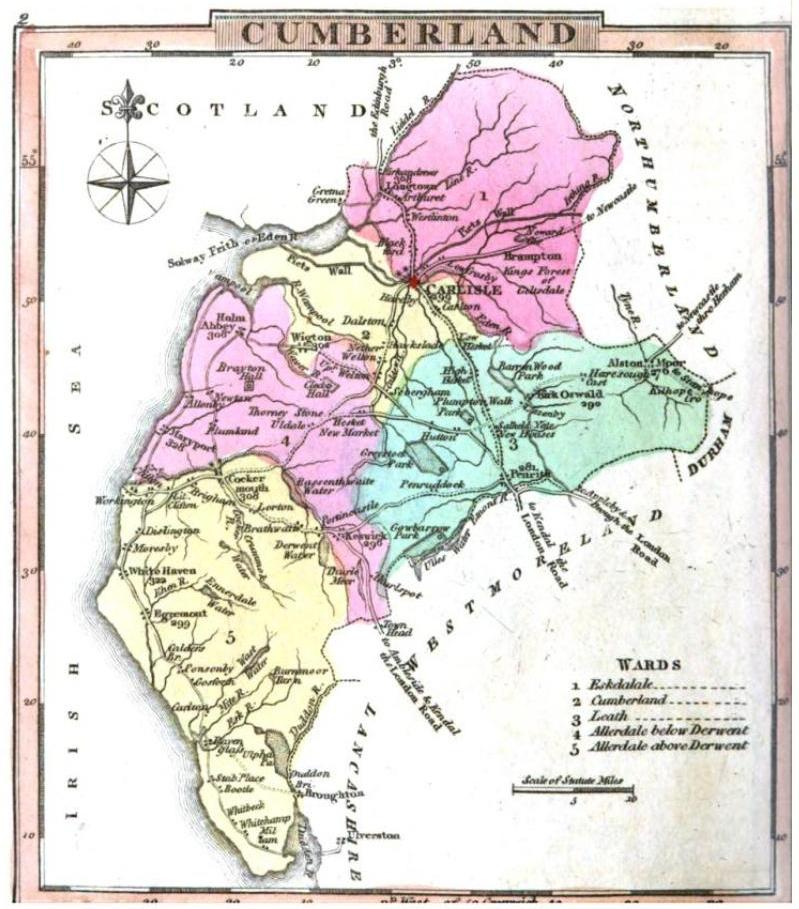
Map of Cumberland showing Wigton in Cumberland Ward in Cumberland, 1824

Wigton was an ancient parish within the historic county of Cumberland. The parish was subdivided into four townships, being Oulton, Waverton, Woodside, and a Wigton township covering the central part of the parish around the town itself. From the 17th century onwards, parishes were gradually given various civil functions under the poor laws, in addition to their original ecclesiastical functions. In some cases, including Wigton, the civil functions were exercised by each township separately rather than the parish as a whole. In 1866, the legal definition of 'parish' was changed to be the areas used for administering the poor laws, and so the townships also became civil parishes.

A Wigton local government district was created in 1875, covering parts of the Wigton and Woodside civil parishes, administered by an elected local board. The civil parishes of Wigton and Woodside were united into a short-lived parish called Wigton cum Woodside in 1887. Local government districts were reconstituted as urban districts under the Local Government Act 1894. The 1894 Act also directed that civil parishes could no longer straddle district boundaries, and so the Wigton cum Woodside parish was split into a Wigton parish matching the urban district and a Woodside parish which covered the remainder outside the urban district. Wigton Urban District was abolished in 1934, with the parish being reclassified as a rural parish within the Wigton Rural District and given a parish council.

Wigton Rural District was abolished in 1974, becoming part of the borough of Allerdale in the new county of Cumbria. Allerdale was in turn abolished in 2023 when the new Cumberland Council was created, also taking over the functions of the abolished Cumbria County Council in the area.

== Industry ==
Wigton's principal employer is the Innovia Films Ltd (locally known as The Factory) in the centre of the town. In 1936 the British New Wrap Co Ltd was formed in Wigton, Cumberland, and production of cellulose film began at the site which had previously been a jam-making facility, and then set up to produce "artificial silk" or Rayon. In 1936 the company changed its name to British Rayophane Ltd. The company's main products are:

- Labels and graphics
- Cellophane and Propafilm – bubble-produced BOPP film
- Substrates for plastic banknotes – used for multiple currencies worldwide including the new British polymer banknotes
- Plastic labels – replacing paper labels due to their resistance to tearing, scuffing and water damage. Clear labels are especially popular as they give the 'upmarket' appearance of graphics printed directly onto a bottle or container
- UV-resistant films – for promotional and POS/POP graphics

Wigton is the headquarters of the British National Party.

== Media ==
Local news and television programmes are provided by BBC North East and Cumbria and ITV Border. Television signals are received from the nearby Caldbeck TV transmitter located south east of the town. Local radio stations are BBC Radio Cumbria and Greatest Hits Radio Cumbria & South West Scotland. The town is served by the local newspaper, Times & Star (formerly The Cumberland News).

== Transport ==
As of March 2026, all bus routes in the town are run by Stagecoach Cumbria and North Lancashire. Services run towards Carlisle, Whitehaven and Keswick. The Cumbrian Coast railway line serves the town. As of March 2026, services run to Carlisle, Whitehaven, Barrow-in-Furness or Manchester Airport.

== Sport ==
The opening stage of the Tour of Britain Women's cycle race passed through Wigton in 2026.

== Notable people ==
- Richard Bell, cricketer for London County Cricket Club
- Melvyn Bragg, writer and broadcaster was born and lived his early life in the town and, when raised to the peerage, took Lord Bragg of Wigton as his title
- Jarrad Branthwaite, footballer, plays for Everton F.C.
- Charles Dickens, visited the town with Wilkie Collins in 1857, and it was subsequently mentioned in The Lazy Tour of Two Idle Apprentices
- Anna Ford, broadcaster, was brought up in Wigton
- Thomas Holliday, one of a handful of Dual-code rugby internationals for England
- William Perry Briggs, Medical Officer of Health to Wigton Rural District Council (188?–1928)
- Robert Smirke, artist, born in Wigton
- Roger Liddle, Baron Liddle, elected to Cumbria County Council for the Wigton Division.
- William Henry Bragg, physicist and Nobel Laureate; Braggite is named after him

== Gallery ==
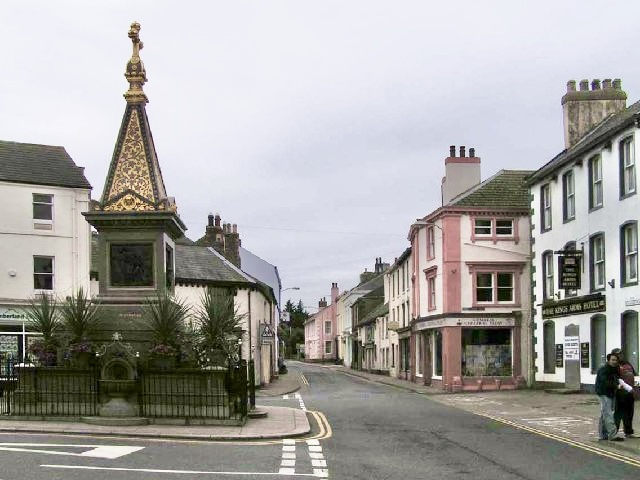
Wigton Monument

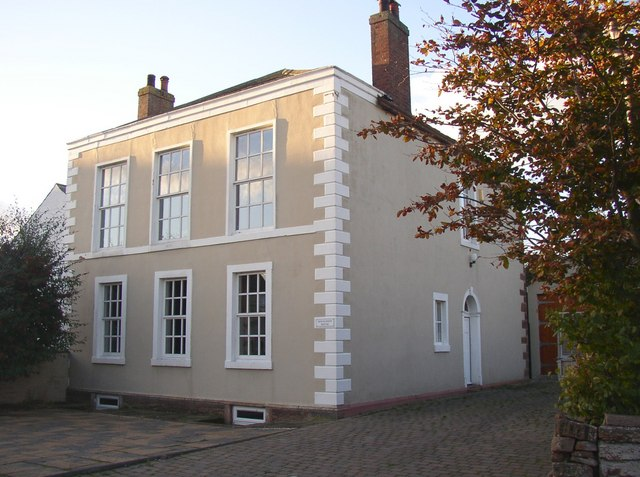
Donaldson House

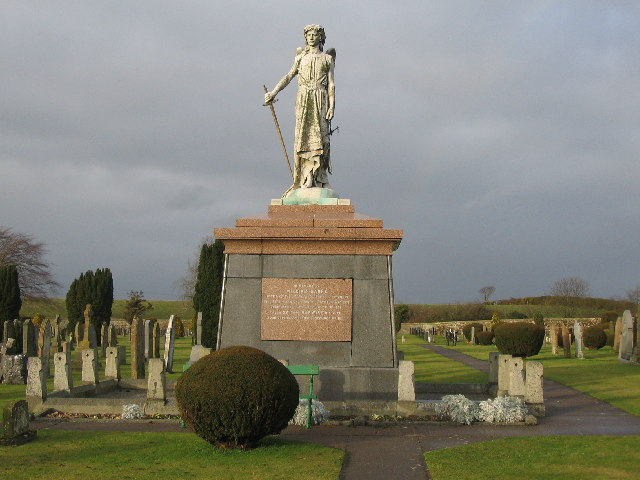
Wigton Cemetery

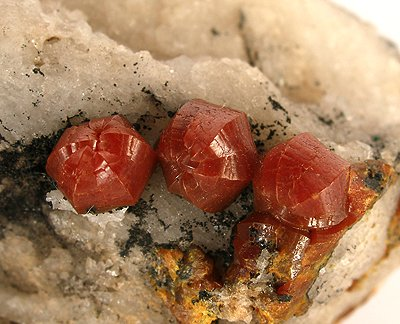
Campylite specimen from Caldbeck Fells

== See also ==
- Listed buildings in Wigton
