= Edderside =

Hamlet in Cumbria, England

Coordinates: 54.7965°N 3.3996°W

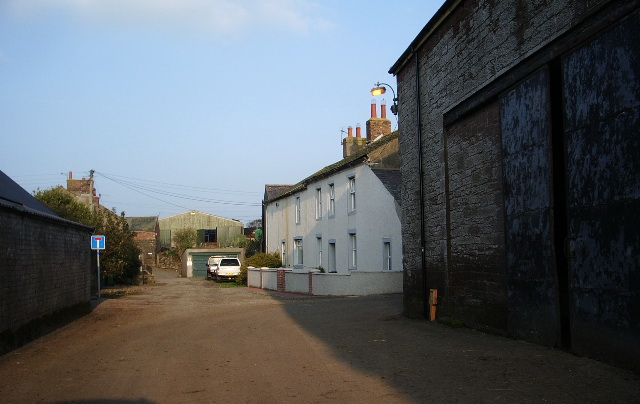
- The road through Edderside. This road runs from the B5300 on the coast through Edderside and Jericho before joining the B5301 near Tarns.

- Location in Allerdale, Cumbria Location within Cumbria
- OS grid reference: NY100455
- Civil parish: Holme St Cuthbert
- Unitary authority: Cumberland
- Ceremonial county: Cumbria
- Region: North West
- Country: England
- Sovereign state: United Kingdom
- Post town: MARYPORT
- Postcode district: CA15
- Dialling code: 01900
- Police: Cumbria
- Fire: Cumbria
- Ambulance: North West
- UK Parliament: Penrith and Solway

Edderside is a hamlet in the civil parish of Holme St Cuthbert in Cumbria, England. It is located approximately one mile as the crow files to the south-east of Mawbray, or two-and-a-half miles by road, and a similar distance east of Salta, and north-east of Allonby. The hamlet of Jericho is located less than a mile to the north-east. Approximately 23 miles to the north-east is the city of Carlisle. Allonby Bay, an inlet of the Solway Firth, is one-and-a-half miles to the south-west, as is the B5300 coast road which runs between Silloth-on-Solway, six-and-a-half miles to the north, and Maryport, six miles to the south.

Notable landmarks in the area include Edderside Hall and the church at Holme St. Cuthbert. Excavations of a cropmark enclosure at Edderside were conducted in 1989–1990 by Robert H. Bewley.

== Toponymy ==
The name Edderside is derived perhaps from the Old English ædre-sīde, meaning "beside the water-course". Another possibility for the first part of the name is *ador, an ancient Brittonic river-name element, meaning "a channel", from the name for a stream that flows into the Black Dub. Recorded variant spellings include Eddersyde, Edarside, Eddysid, Etherside, Ederside, and Adderside.

== History ==
The area around Edderside has a very long history. On nearby Salta Moss, a Bronze Age rapier was discovered in the 1980s, and may have been crafted as early as 1100BC, proving the area was inhabited at least by that time. The rapier currently resides in the Tullie House museum in Carlisle. The site of the present hamlet was inhabited by the second century AD, and there are Roman remains in the vicinity.

This section of the west Cumbrian coastline was fortified by the Romans during this period, as a series of milefortlets were constructed to guard the Solway coast beyond the western end of Hadrian's Wall. The remains of Milefortlet 17 are located at nearby Dubmill Point.

Following the dissolution of the monasteries in the 1530s, records from Holmcultram Abbey in Abbeytown showed Edderside paid an annual tithe of six large baskets of meal. Also during the 16th century, raids by Scots across the Solway Firth were still relatively common. At Dubmill Point, a man named William Osmotherly was kidnapped for ransom during such a raid. As such, local communities including Edderside participated in the "seawake", a night watch along the coast.

In the 19th century, there were six functioning farms in the hamlet, each paying an annual tithe of twelve bushels of barley. In 1828, a man named William Barwise built a large home in the hamlet which is still standing. He and his wife Fanny moved to the area from Shropshire and lived in Edderside Hall until 1845, when they left the area for Liverpool. Between the 1820s and 1870s, one additional cottage was built for farm labourers. By the mid-19th century, Edderside was considered to be a wealthy settlement, at least by the standards of the area, with a single estate in the early 1880s being worth at least £10,000. Adjusted for inflation, such an estate would be worth £1,000,000 in the 2010s.

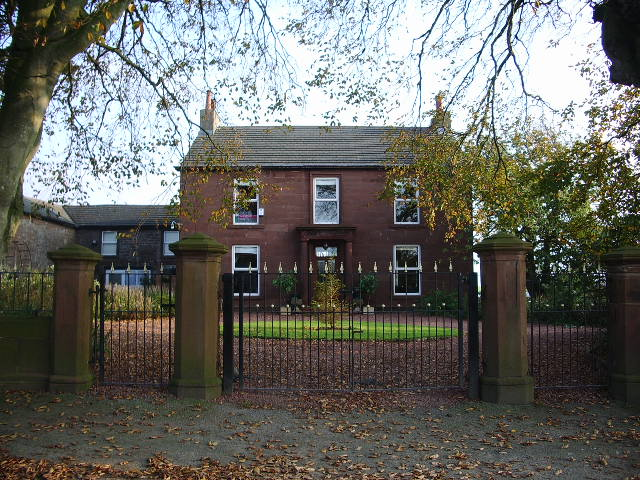
Edderside Hall was built by William Barwise in the 19th century.

In 1878, an iron ship was commissioned in Liverpool bearing the name Edderside by the Whitehaven Ship Building Company. She had her maiden voyage from Liverpool that year, arriving in Sydney in June 1879. In 1895 she was converted to a barque rig, and sold to new owners based in Norway in 1903. She sank off the coast of South Africa in 1919, having left the port of Durban bound for Buenos Aires with a cargo of coal, but collided with another vessel in dense fog. All seven hands were lost.

== Edderside today ==
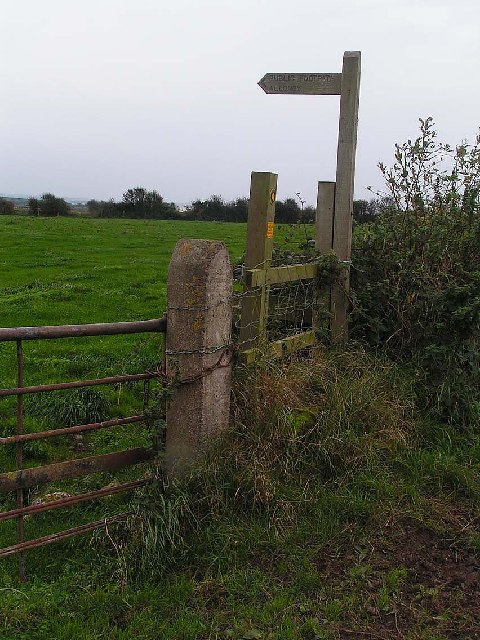
A public footpath near Edderside which leads to the village of Allonby.

Edderside is a small hamlet with three functioning farms, but lacks any facilities of its own. There is a caravan park and restaurant, Manor House Park, to the south-west on the road leading to the coast. At nearby Mawbray, the Lowther Arms pub closed in May 2018. The village of Allonby has several hotels and restaurants, a leisure centre with a swimming pool, and Twentyman's, a small shop.

On the B5300 coast road, a mile-and-a-half to the south-west of Edderside, a bus service runs approximately once every two hours north to Silloth-on-Solway and south to Maryport. From Maryport railway station, the nearest station to the hamlet, trains along the Cumbrian Coast Line head north to Carlisle and south to Whitehaven, Barrow-in-Furness, and occasionally Lancaster.

Edderside lies within the Solway Coast Area of Outstanding Natural Beauty. This AONB was designated to preserve what was determined to be one of the most picturesque stretches of coastline in all of England. Nearby Salta Moss is also a Site of Special Scientific Interest.

== See also ==
- Listed buildings in Holme St Cuthbert
