= Soloway =

Soloway, Solloway is a surname (Russian: Соловей and Ukrainian: Соловій, "Nightingale"; Yiddish: סולוביי). Variants include Solovey, Solovay, Solovyei, Solovei, Salovey, etc. Notable people with these surnames include:

== Soloway or Solloway ==
- Amanda Solloway (born 1961), British Conservative Party politician (MP 2015–2017)
- Faith Soloway (born 1964), American folk rock musician
- Joey Soloway (born 1965), American television showrunner and writer
- Larry Solway (1928–2012), Canadian actor and broadcaster
- Paul Soloway (1941–2007), American bridge champion
- Robert Soloway (born 1980), American founder of Newport Internet Marketing and convicted originator of spam

== Solovey, Solovei, etc. ==
- Andrey Solovey (born 1994), Belarusian footballer
- Artsyom Salavey (born 1990), Belarusian footballer
- Dmytro Solovey (born 1993), Ukrainian Paralympic judoka
- Elena Solovey (born 1947), Soviet actress
- Hanna Solovey (born 1992), Ukrainian racing cyclist
- Mikhail Solovey (born 1980), Russian footballer
- Peter Salovey (born 1958), American social psychologist and President of Yale University
- Robert M. Solovay (born 1938), American mathematician
- Sarah Solovay (born 1994), American singer-songwriter
- Valery Solovei (born 1960), Russian historian

== Fictional characters ==
- Georgie Soloway, main character in the 1971 film Who Is Harry Kellerman and Why Is He Saying Those Terrible Things About Me?

== See also ==
- Soloveitchik, a surname
- Solovyov, a surname
- Solovey (disambiguation)
- Solvay (disambiguation)
- Solway (disambiguation)
