= B5300 road =

Road on the Cumbrian coast in England

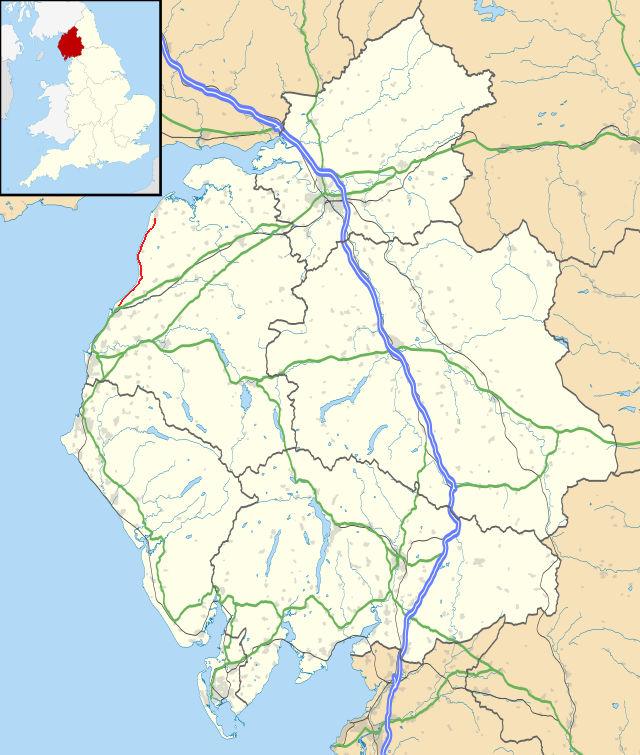
The B5300, shown in red, runs for approximately twelve miles along the west Cumbrian coastline between Silloth to the north and Maryport to the south.

The B5300 (known locally as the Coast Road) is a B road which runs for approximately twelve miles between the towns of Silloth and Maryport in the Allerdale borough of Cumbria, England. From north to south, it passes through the villages of Blitterlees, Beckfoot, Mawbray, Dubmill, and Allonby. It runs through the Solway Coast Area of Outstanding Natural Beauty, passes close to the Salta Moss Site of Special Scientific Interest, Milefortlet 21, a Roman archaeological site, the salt pans, a remnant of the Solway plain's medieval saltmaking industry, and the village of Crosscanonby. It is an important route for carrying goods to and from Silloth docks and Maryport harbour. It is also the major road connecting smaller coastal settlements with Maryport and Silloth, from where other roads lead to Workington, Whitehaven, Wigton, and Carlisle. A short section of the road between Dubmill and Mawbray was closed in February 2019 due to coastal erosion, and reopened in June 2019.

== The route ==
=== Silloth-on-Solway to Beckfoot ===
The B5300's northern terminus is close to the town centre of Silloth-on-Solway. The cobblestone B5302 gives way to the paved B5300, which then crosses over the old railway bridge that once led to Silloth railway station before winding past the Crofts estate and Stanwix holiday park on its way out of Silloth. The short stretch of road after departing Silloth is the furthest away from the shoreline that the B5300 gets during its entire twelve miles, and after passing through the village of Blitterlees just outside Silloth, and coming within a hundred yards of the hamlet of Wolsty, it joins the coast.

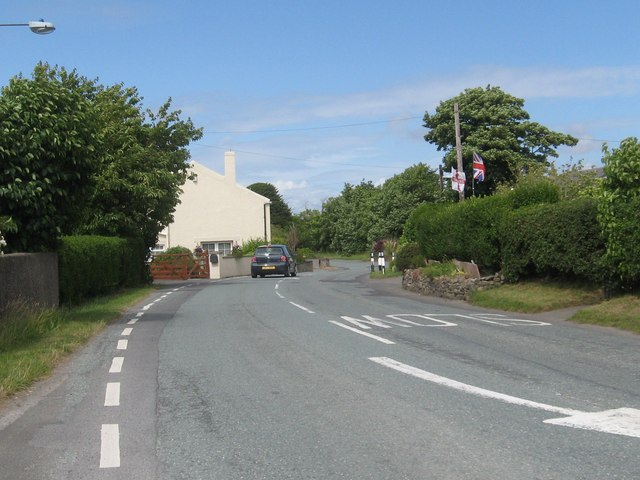
The B5300 heading through Blitterlees in Cumbria.

The next settlement on the route is the hamlet of Beckfoot, about a mile and three-quarters from Blitterlees, and upon entering, the B5300 passes from the parish of Holme Low, where it has been since departing Silloth, into the parish of Holme St. Cuthbert.

=== Bank Mill to Dubmill ===
A mile south of Beckfoot is the side-road which leads to Newtown, and also to the Gincase, a farm park and tearoom. Immediately past the Newtown road comes Bank Mill Nurseries, which includes a garden, nature reserve, play area, and restaurant. The B5300 continues past Bank Mill, with sand dunes known locally as Mawbray Bank on the shore side, and agricultural land belonging to local farmers on the land side. The road then arrives at the western end of the village of Mawbray, and passes by a farm and several houses. There are two turnings here, one which leads away from the shore and into the village itself, and another unpaved road which leads to Mawbray Yard, a small collection of homes located very close to the beach. Near Mawbray Yard there is also a car park for visitors to the Solway coast Area of Outstanding Natural Beauty, which incorporates much of the road's route.

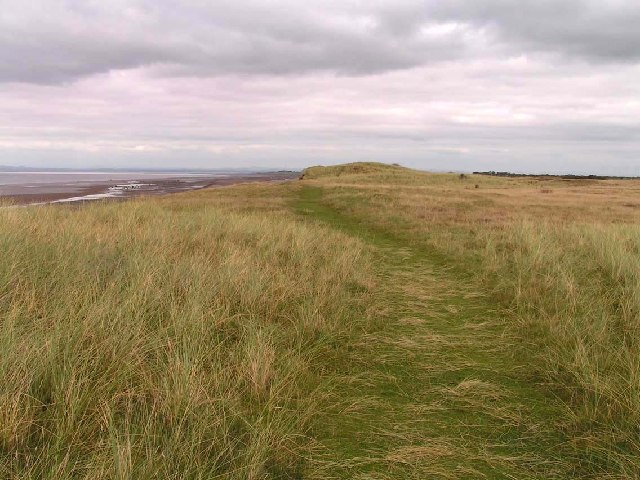
Mawbray Bank, looking north. The B5300 is slightly to the right of the sand dunes.

Shortly after passing Mawbray, the B5300 takes a more southerly turn at Dubmill Point. This marks the start of Allonby Bay, an inlet of the Solway Firth. There are two side roads within a couple of hundred yards of each other in the vicinity of Dubmill, the first leads to Salta, and ultimately on to Mawbray via Hailforth, and the second leads to Edderside. Also along this section of the road, a large concrete sea wall is present to prevent erosion and damage to the road or nearby farms. However, particularly heavy storms have damaged the sea defences in the past, and in 2014, Cumbria County Council launched a £130,000 repair scheme. In the first half of 2015 major repair work has been carried out to the sea wall for several hundred yards north of Seacroft Farm. This section of the B5300 is also susceptible to closure during bad weather. The B5300 crosses over several small streams in this area, including Cross Beck and the Black Dub.

=== Allonby to Milefortlet 21 ===
Just under one mile from the Edderside road is the village of Allonby. Among the side-roads in the village are Moss Lane, which leads to Spring Lea leisure centre, and Wigton Road, which eventually leads out of Allonby to the village of Westnewton. The road also crosses over Allonby beck, before passing the village green and Twentyman's shop and ice cream parlour, which is popular both with locals and tourists, especially during the summer months.

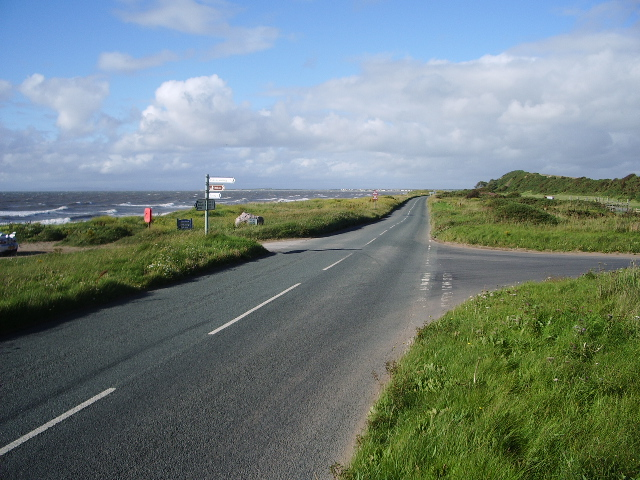
The Crosscanonby junction before the car park was destroyed in a storm in 2014. The village of Allonby can just be made out in the background.

The B5300 continues south, following the shoreline of Allonby bay out of the village, past the side-road that leads to Hayton, and the caravan park at Blue Dial, and shortly passes by Milefortlet 21. These are the well-preserved remains of a Roman milefortlet, part of the coastal defences which extended beyond the western end of Hadrian's Wall. On the opposite side of the road from the milefortlet are the remains of medieval salt pans, which would have been used for salt production, once a major industry along the Solway coast.

=== Crosscanonby to Ellen Grove ===
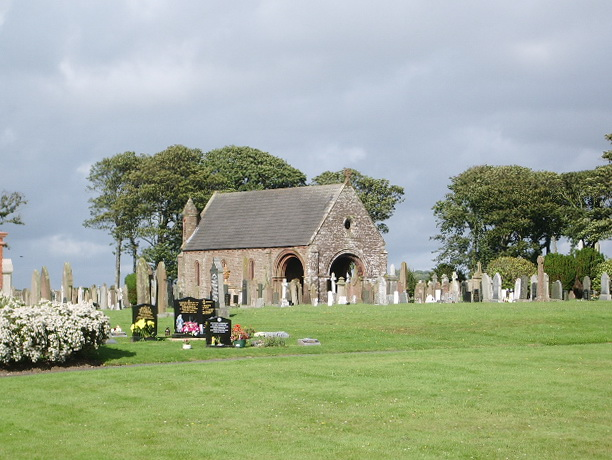
Maryport Cemetery and chapel. The B5300 runs right past the cemetery gates.

A quarter of a mile past Milefortlet 21 is another side-road, this time leading to the village of Crosscanonby. There was a car park opposite the turning, but it was claimed by the sea during a winter storm in early 2014. As Allonby bay turns, so does the road, and by the time it reaches Maryport golf club it is heading almost due west. A bend in the road as it cuts through the golf course, however, puts it back on a more southerly course as it enters the final mile toward its southern terminus. A quarter of a mile beyond the golf club is Maryport cemetery, on the outskirts of the town.

Just outside the town of Maryport, approximately a quarter of a mile east of Netherhall School, is the B5300's southern terminus. Here, at Ellen Grove, it meets the A596, which heads west into Maryport, and east towards Crosby, and eventually Aspatria and Wigton.

== Incidents ==
The B5300 has seen several accidents and crashes, including some fatalities. In 2005, 18-year-old Lloyd Marsh, of Beckfoot, was killed when the car he was driving collided with a taxi. In May 2014, Yvonne Elizabeth Hetherington-Tunstall, 48, a restaurant owner from Maryport, was killed in another accident on the road.

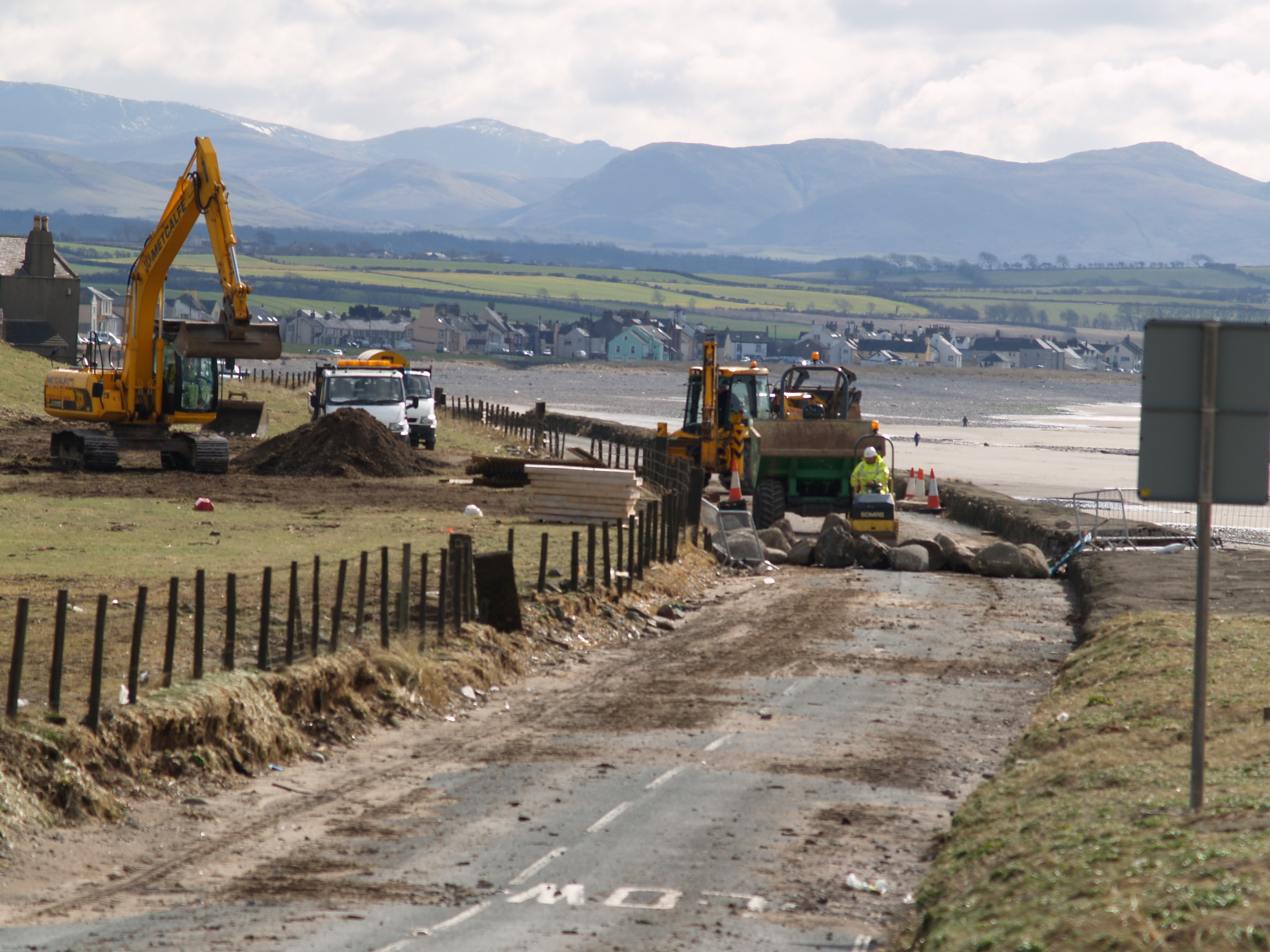
Repairs to the B5300 at Dubmill after a severe storm in March 2008.

As a result of some of these incidents, campaigners have been arguing for a reduction of the road's speed limit since at least 2004. The speed limit for most of the road (excepting where it passes through settlements) is currently 60 miles per hour, the highest limit for non-motorways in the United Kingdom. However, at times of bad weather, the speed limit can be reduced by Cumbria County Council.

The road itself has been damaged on several occasions as a result of storms and inclement weather. In particularly vulnerable areas around Mawbray and Dubmill, a concrete sea wall has been constructed to minimise damage and prevent coastal erosion. However, the sea wall itself has been breached on several occasions, including in 2008. The sea wall is maintained annually, at a cost of £10,000 to Allerdale Borough Council.

In October 2018, the southern section of the B5300 was closed to all traffic for three weeks. Initially, the road was closed between Allonby and Crosscanonby, and after work on this stretch was completed, the section between Crosscanonby and Maryport was closed. Local businesses complained that the scale of the work did not require the closure of the road, suggesting that traffic controls should have been used instead, as the road closure was adversely affecting trade.

From November to December 2018, a public consultation called the Cumbria Coastal Strategy was held to evaluate and manage the risks related to coastal flooding and erosion along the Cumbrian coastline. Concerns were raised about the proximity of the B5300 to the shoreline, especially in unprotected areas or where coastal defences had been damaged. The possibility of re-routing the road to protect it from coastal erosion and storm damage was raised.

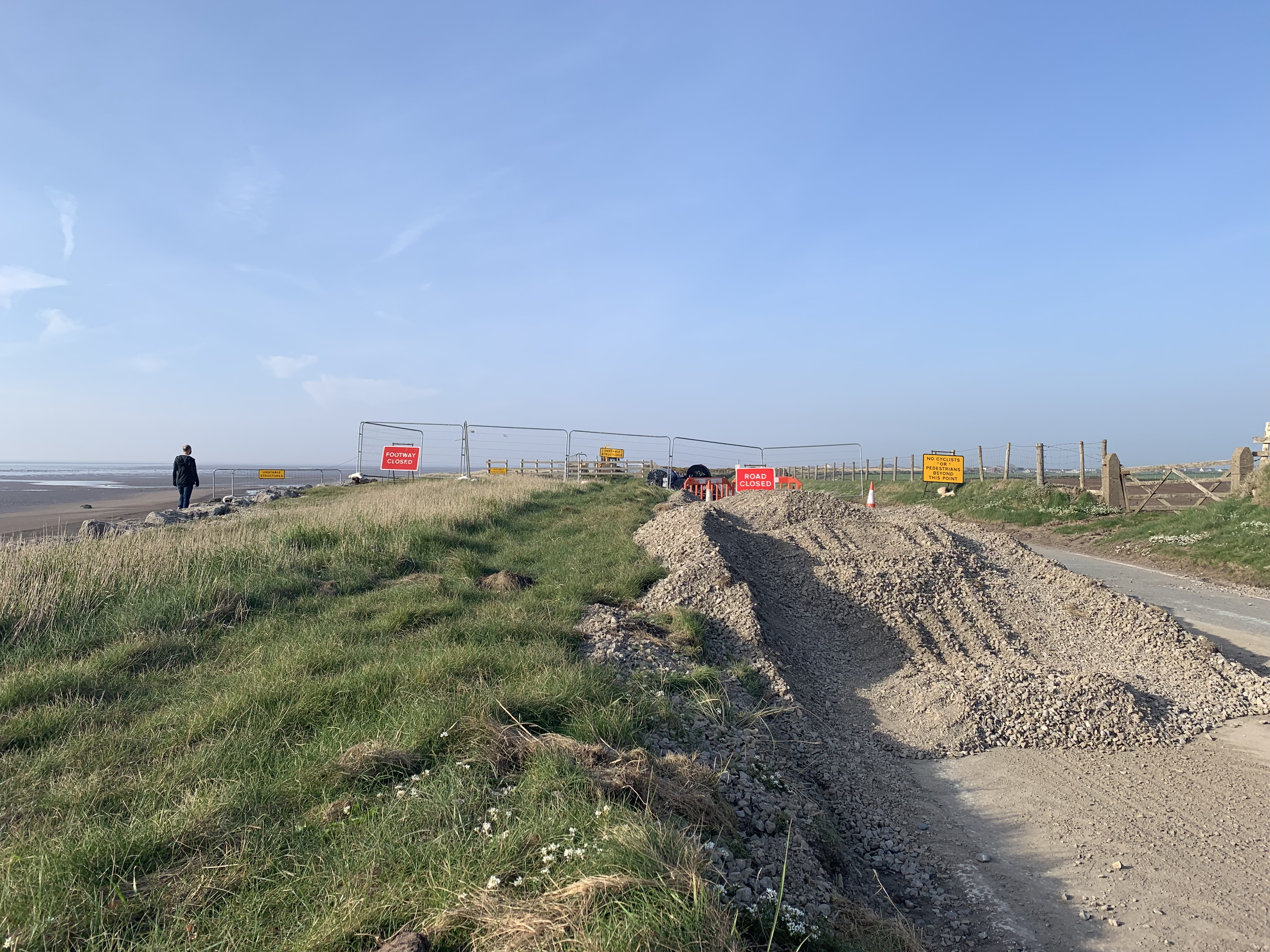
The B5300 closed between Dubmill and Mawbray in April 2019

In February 2019, a section of the road between Dubmill and Mawbray was closed "indefinitely" after an emergency inspection revealed significant coastal erosion of over two metres in a matter of weeks. The road was deemed to be "too close to the sea" by inspectors, and emergency funding totalling £281,000 was allocated to shore up the road and prevent damage. A license was granted by the Marine Management Organisation to install new rock armour coastal defences. Sue Hayman, the MP for the constituency of Workington in which the B5300 road is located, called for an urgent meeting with DEFRA officials, believing that any further delay in installing the new coastal defences could leave the road irreparably damaged. The closure had a serious effect on local businesses and charities. Several licenses were required in order for work to be able to begin, including a European Protected Species License. This license was eventually granted by Natural England on the basis that an ecologist would be on-site for the duration of the work. Protecting the Site of Special Scientific Interest and the local natterjack toad population was behind the delay, and the license was finally granted on the 17th of April 2019. Work commenced on the 23rd of April, with the road expected to re-open in July 2019. The road re-opened on the 20th of June 2019, after a section of rock armour 120m long was installed. The closed section of the road was also resurfaced. After the road was re-opened, local MP Sue Hayman called for "urgent action" over the future of the road. A meeting between Hayman and the government was delayed, in part due to that year's Conservative Party leadership election. Parts of the route of the B5300 are designated as being in managed retreat, further confusing the road's future.

In November 2020, Cumbria County Council applied for permission to engage in what were considered to be emergency repair works to coastal defences near Crosscanonby in order to protect the road. Between 2013 and 2019, 8m of erosion occurred, threatening the future of the road. The council has said that their long term plan is to realign the B5300, but in the short term work was required to shore up coastal defences to prevent the road being lost.

== Special events ==
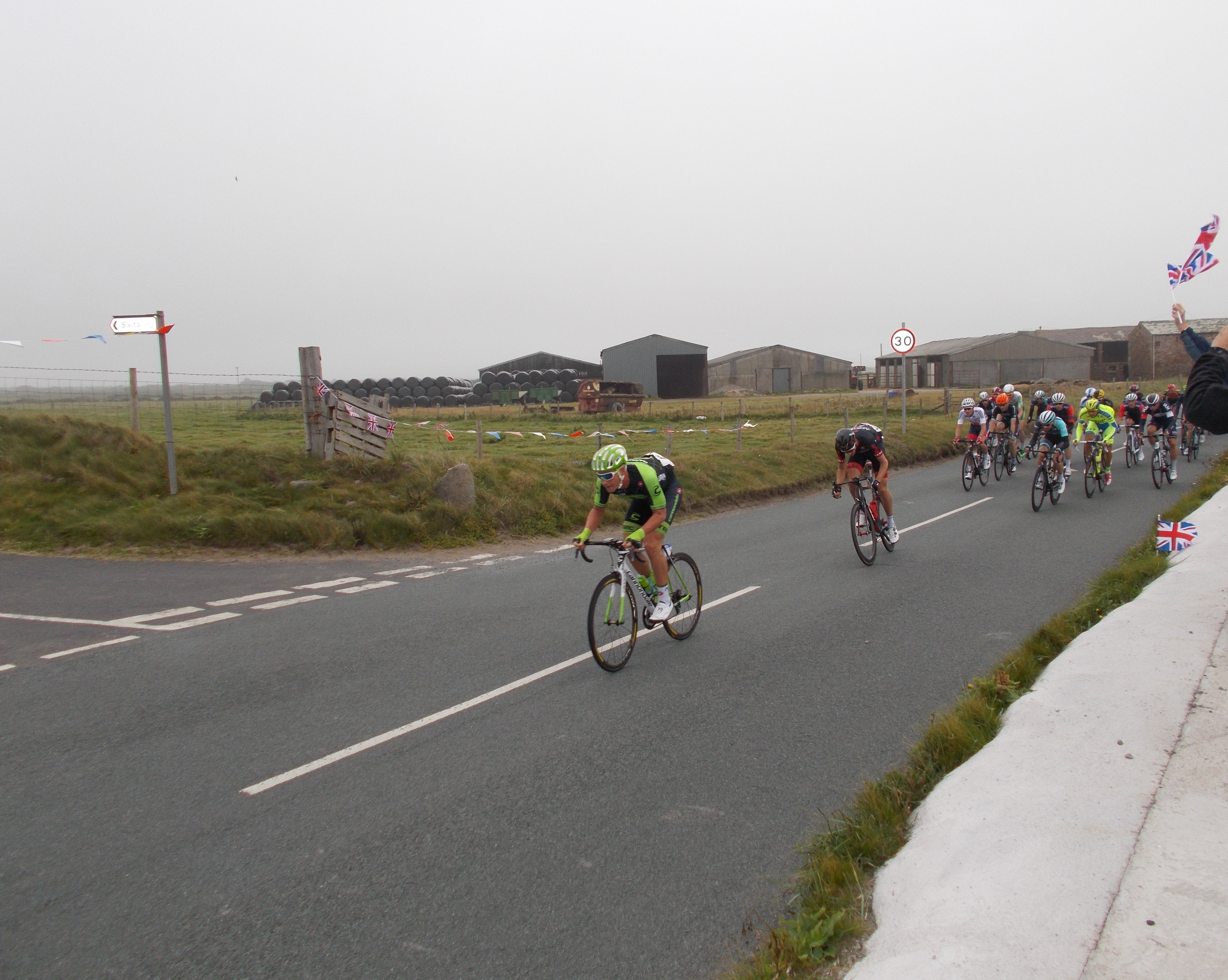
The Tour of Britain riders on the B5300 coast road at Dubmill, near Salta.

In September 2015, stage three of the Tour of Britain ran along the entire length of the B5300 as part of its route from Cockermouth to Floors Castle. The road was closed in stages as police officers on motorcycles rode ahead of the peloton, closing off side roads and stopping traffic. Silloth-on-Solway in particular made a big fuss about welcoming the riders from the Tour.

== Public transportation ==
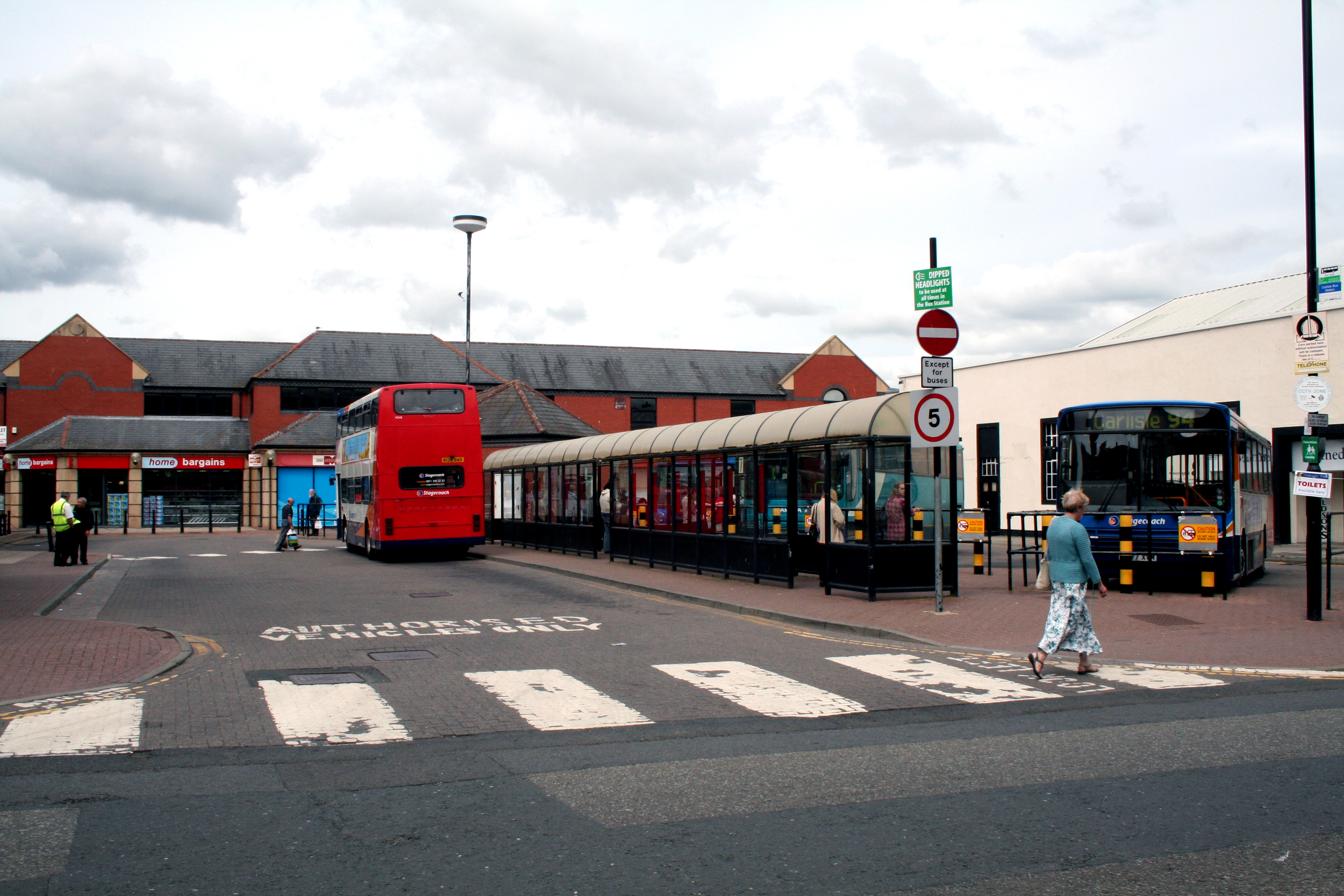
Two Stagecoach Cumbria & North Lancashire buses at Carlisle bus station. Stagecoach Cumbria & North Lancashire run routes from Maryport and Silloth to Carlisle and other locations around Cumbria.

The B5300 is served by a single bus route which runs the entire length of the road. The number 60, operated by Ellenvale Coach Co Ltd of Fletchertown without any government or local subsidies and runs from Skinburness, through Silloth onwards to Maryport and now once again continues on to Workington. Connections are available in Maryport to Stagecoach-operated buses heading south to Workington and north to Carlisle, and in Silloth to services to Carlisle via Abbeytown. The number 60 was temporarily only able to run between Allonby and Maryport in February 2019 due to the closure of the section of the road between Dubmill and Mawbray, but subsequently was able to resume its full route by taking a diversion.

In addition to the public bus service, there are several school bus routes which run along all or part of the B5300, carrying pupils to Solway Community School in Silloth, Netherhall School in Maryport, and Nelson Thomlinson School in Wigton.

Approximately one mile from the southern terminus of the B5300 is Maryport railway station, on the Cumbrian Coast Line, where services run hourly between Carlisle and Whitehaven, with some trains going on to Barrow-in-Furness and Lancaster.
