= Salta Moss =

Protected area in Cumbria, England

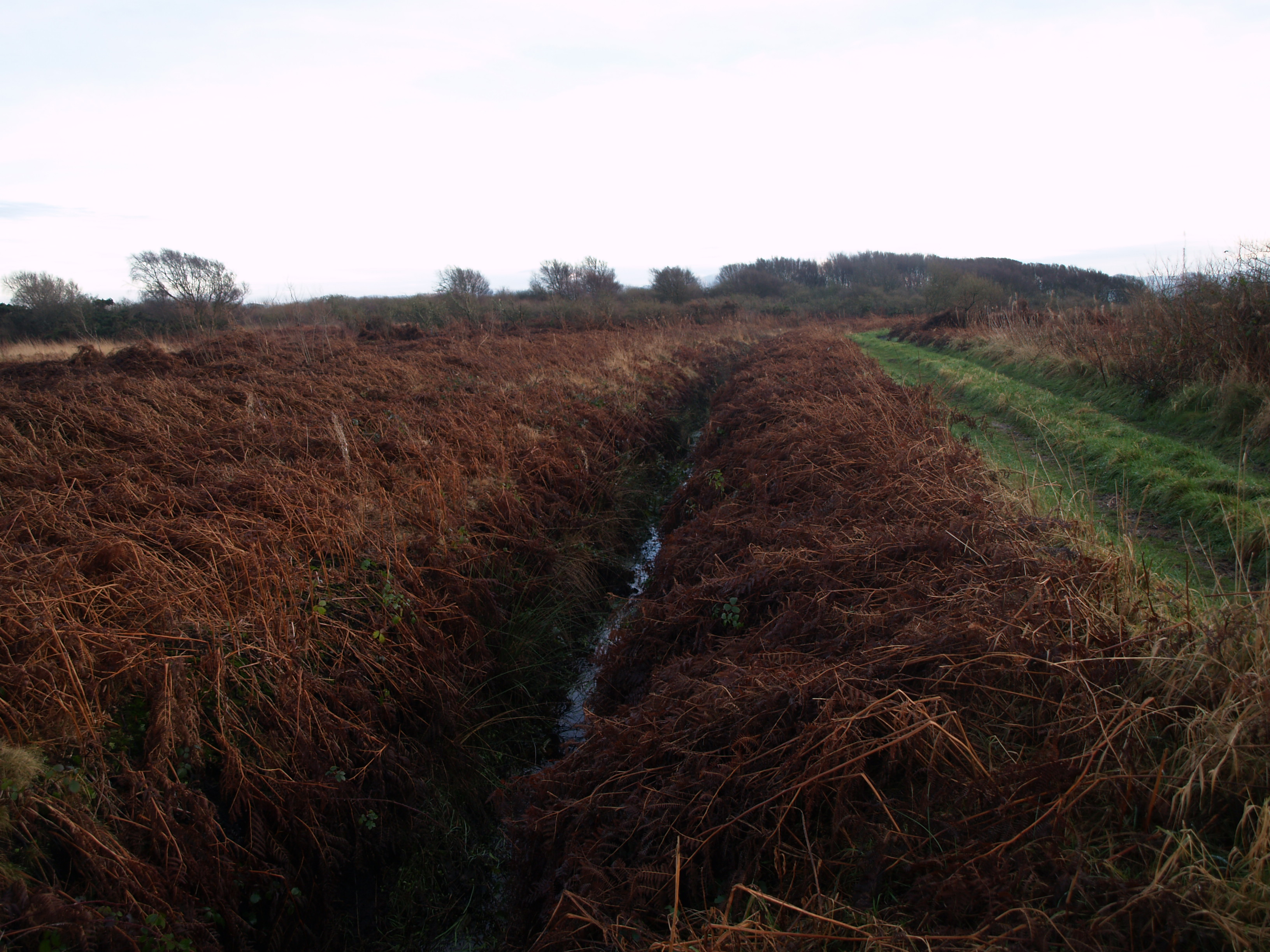
- Farm track and irrigation channel on Salta Moss.

- Location within the former Allerdale Borough Location within Cumbria
- Location: Holme St. Cuthbert civil parish, Cumbria, England
- Nearest town: Maryport
- Coordinates: 54.7934°N 3.4243°W
- Area: 45.62 ha (112.7 acres)
- Elevation: 7.6 m (25 ft)
- Designated: August 1982
- Named for: The hamlet of Salta
- Governing body: Natural England

Salta Moss is a raised blanket mire which is a Site of Special Scientific Interest (SSSI) located in the hamlet of Salta, in Cumbria, England. It was determined to be of biological interest (as opposed to geological interest, the other criteria for SSSIs) under the Wildlife and Countryside Act 1981. The site, measuring 45.6 hectares (113 acres), was officially designated in August 1982.

== Location ==
The SSSI is located in the hamlet of Salta, which is in the civil parish of Holme St. Cuthbert, in the Cumberland unitary authority area of Cumbria. The site is approximately 0.5 miles (0.80 km) from the coast, approximately 7.6 metres (25 ft) above sea level, and nearby settlements include Dubmill, Edderside, Hailforth, and Mawbray. In addition to its status as a Site of Special Scientific Interest, Salta Moss has some further legal protection due to this section of Solway Firth coastline being a designated Area of Outstanding Natural Beauty. Known as the Solway Coast and headquartered at Silloth, the AONB runs from the estuaries of the rivers Esk and Eden (near Carlisle) to Skinburness, and again from Beckfoot to Crosscanonby along Allonby Bay. Furthermore, the sea at Allonby Bay is a Marine Conservation Zone, granting protection to local aquatic life.

== Toponymy ==
The word Moss in this case refers to a peat bog, not the family of plants. The word comes from the Old English meos or mos, and ultimately from the proto-Germanic musan. The name Salta comes from the Old English sēalt-tir, meaning "land of salt", or simply "salt land". This is due to the Anglo-Saxon era saltmaking industry known to have been present on this part of the Solway coast. Several local house names include the word Moss, or the names of plant species which grow there.

== Historical significance ==
In the 1980s, a rapier from the Bronze Age was discovered on Salta Moss, which may have been crafted as early as 1100 BC. The sword was donated to the Tullie House Museum in Carlisle, where it is on display as of 2019.

== Plant life ==
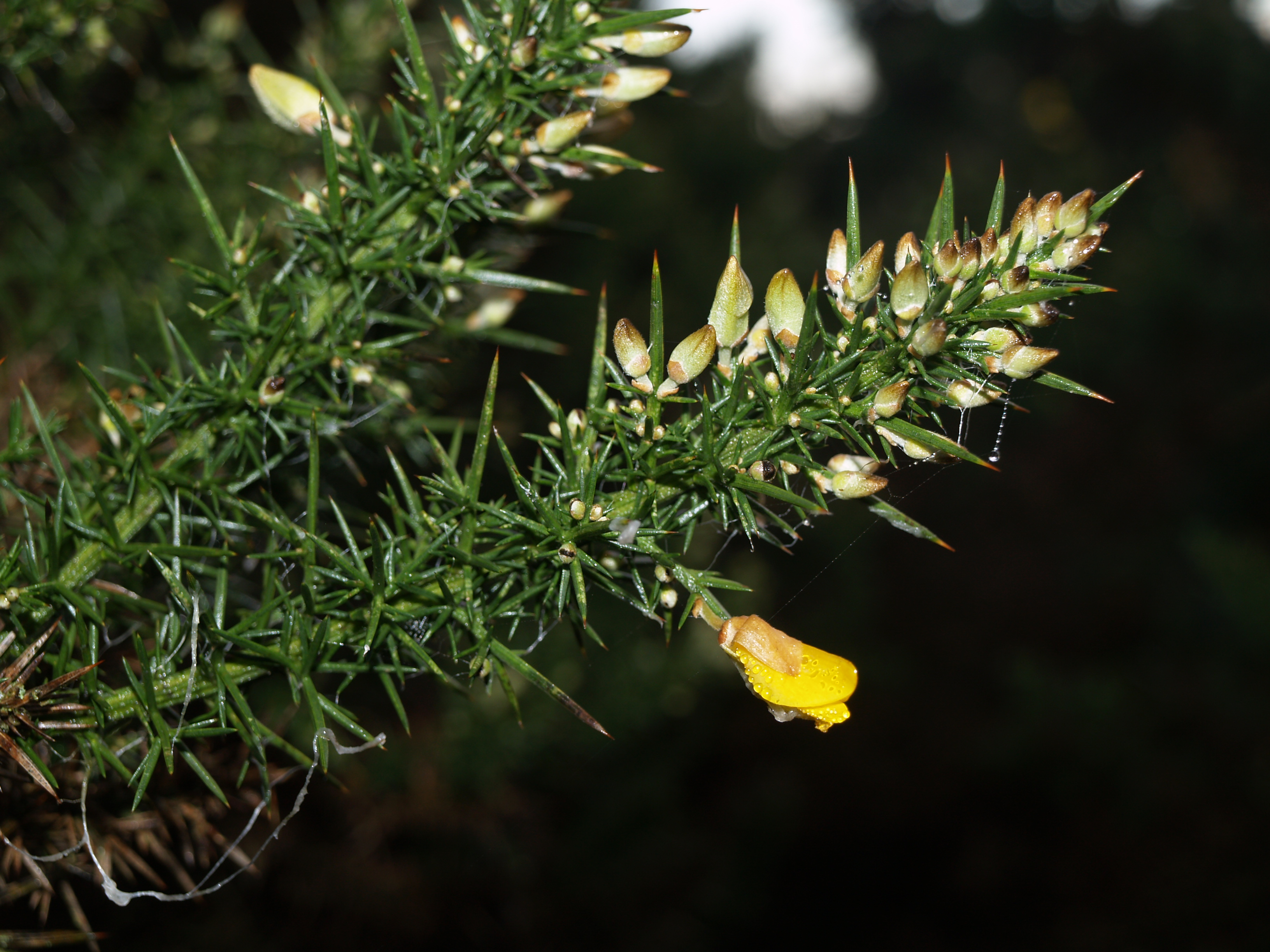
A gorse flower on Salta Moss.

Several species of bog and moor plants are present on Salta Moss. These include Molinia caerulea, commonly known as purple moor grass, which is native to Great Britain and often seen on boggy or marshy ground. There are also several varieties of Ericaceae, commonly known as heather, as well as gorse. The site is known as a raised blanket mire (or blanket bog) due to its climate and the presence of peat. There is also a small area of woodland, and the site sits atop a large deposit of glacial sand. Sand from this same deposit is quarried within a few miles of the SSSI at Overby, near New Cowper.

The main species noted by Natural England, and given as reasons for the SSSI designation, are as follows:

- Angelica sylvestris (wild angelica)
- Carex rostrata (bottle or beaked sedge)
- Erica tetralix (cross-leaved heath)
- Filipendula ulmaria (meadowsweet or mead wort)
- Galium palustre (marsh-bedstraw)
- Juncus acutiflorus (sharp-flowered rush)
- Juncus effusus (common or soft rush)
- Menyanthes trifoliata (bog bean)
- Molinia caerulea (purple moor grass)
- Phragmites communis (common reed)
- Potentilla erecta (tormentil or septfoil)
- Salix pentandra (bay willow)
- Sphagnum cuspidatum (feathery bog-moss or toothed peat moss)
- Sphagnum papillosum (papillose bog-moss)
- Sphagnum recurvum
- Vaccinium oxycoccos (cranberry, or bog or swamp cranberry)

== Animal life ==
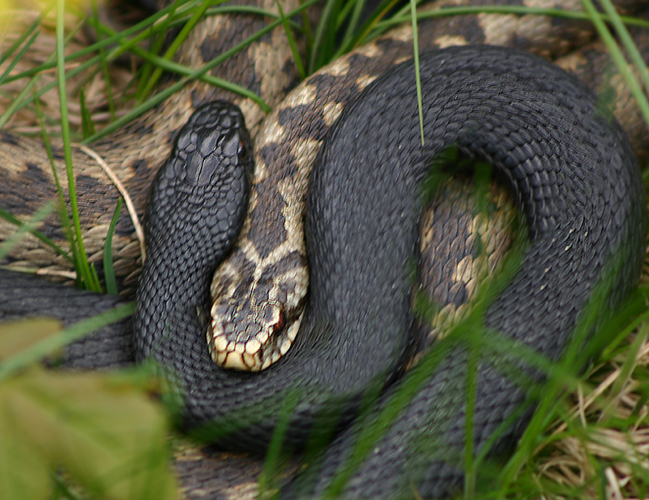
Adders (vipera berus) showing normal and melanistic colourings. Both are known to be present on Salta Moss.

Vipera berus, commonly known as adders, are present on Salta Moss. This species is Britain's only native venomous snake, and they are known to prey on small rodents, such as voles and field mice. Adders occasionally bite people, and their bite, while painful, is usually not fatal and the species is not considered especially dangerous to humans. Melanistic adders (adders which have dark pigmentation) are also noted to be present.

Parts of the site provide shelter for roe deer, and breeding grounds for warblers, and in addition many other species of wild birds are present, both migratory and nonmigratory.

== Status ==
Natural England, the governing body of all SSSIs in England, regards parts of the site as destroyed and various other parts as under threat. This is primarily due to agricultural activity and draining of groundwater. Maintaining the site's status as an SSSI depends upon the retention of a high water table. Natural England notes that further draining of the site would put it at increased risk.
