= Salta, Cumbria =

Hamlet in Cumbria, England

Coordinates: 54.796°N 3.426°W

Salta
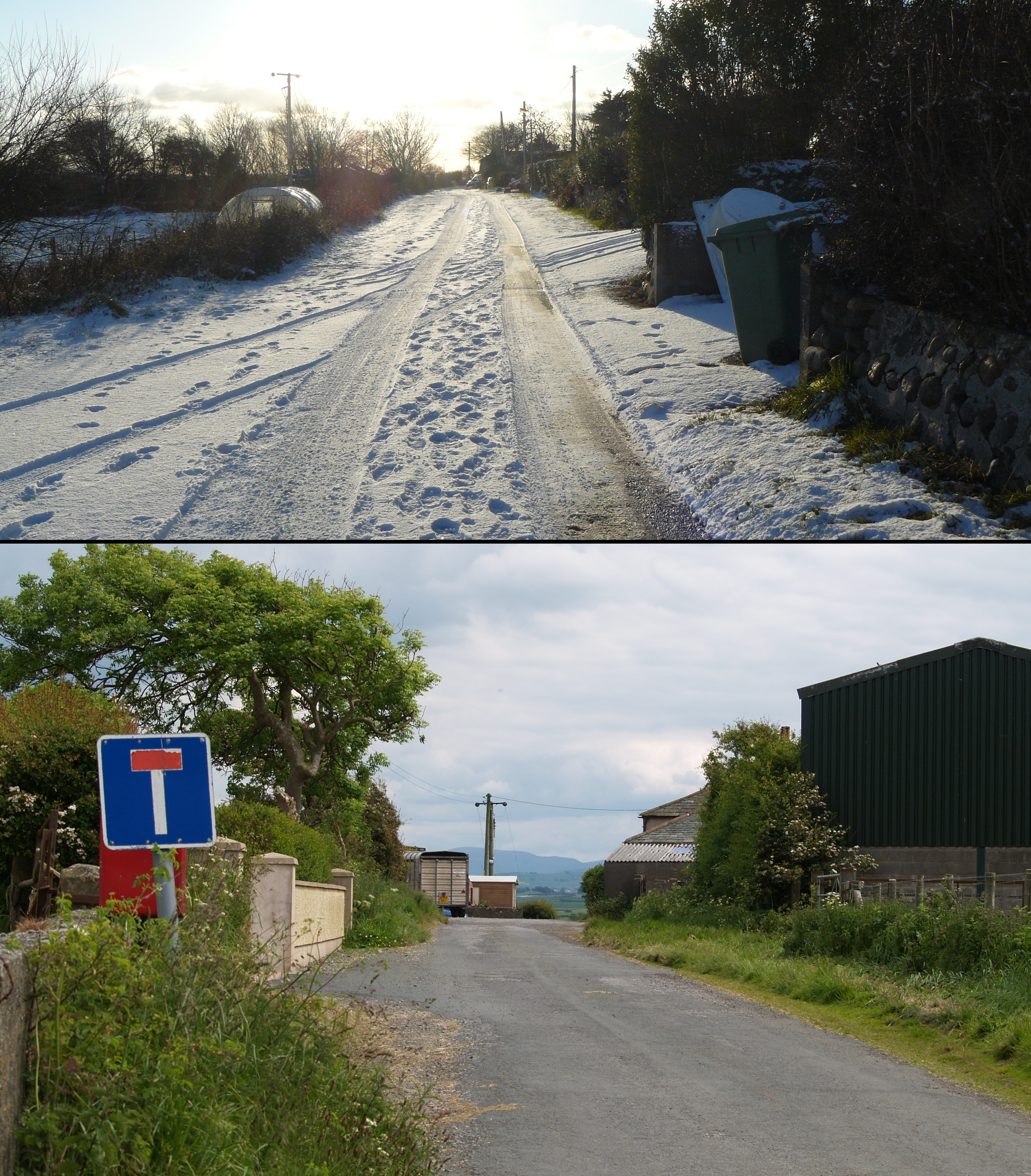
- Above: Salta after an uncommon winter snowfall. Below: The road leading into the hamlet at the top of the hill.

- Location in Allerdale, Cumbria Location within Cumbria
- OS grid reference: NY083455
- Civil parish: Holme St Cuthbert
- Unitary authority: Cumberland
- Ceremonial county: Cumbria
- Region: North West
- Country: England
- Sovereign state: United Kingdom
- Post town: MARYPORT
- Postcode district: CA15
- Dialling code: 01900
- Police: Cumbria
- Fire: Cumbria
- Ambulance: North West
- UK Parliament: Penrith and Solway

Salta is a hamlet in the parish of Holme St Cuthbert in northwestern Cumbria, England. It is 1.1 miles (1.8 km) southwest of the village of Mawbray and 25.1 miles (40.4 km) southwest of the city of Carlisle. It has a population of about 35 people.

Salta can only be accessed from the lane from Mawbray, which goes on to join the B5300 coast road, although two public bridleways provide access over the fields from Hailforth and Mawbray. The hamlet consists of mainly bungalows and a farm is still in operation in the vicinity. A caravan park, Manor House Park, is situated across the Moss to the southeast, to the southwest of the hamlet of Edderside.

The settlement's name is derived from "sēalt-tir", meaning "salt land" in Old English, as during Anglo-Saxon times, salt making was a major industry on the Solway Plain. Fortified during the Roman period, in the 1550s, Salta participated in a system called "seawake", a night watch to guard the coast against incursions across the Solway by the Scots. Salta Moss was designated a Site of Special Scientific Interest in 1954 and forms part of the Solway Coast Area of Outstanding Natural Beauty. It is home to a diversity of wildlife, including Adders, Britain's only native venomous snake, and several varieties of heather, as well as the purple moor grass Molinia caerulea.

== History ==
The name "Salta" comes from Old English "sēalt-tir", meaning "salt land". In Anglo-Saxon times, salt making was a major industry on the Solway coast, and there are remains of medieval salt pans near Milefortlet 21, only a few miles down the coast from Salta. Salta appears in older documents with several variant spellings, including "Sathowe".

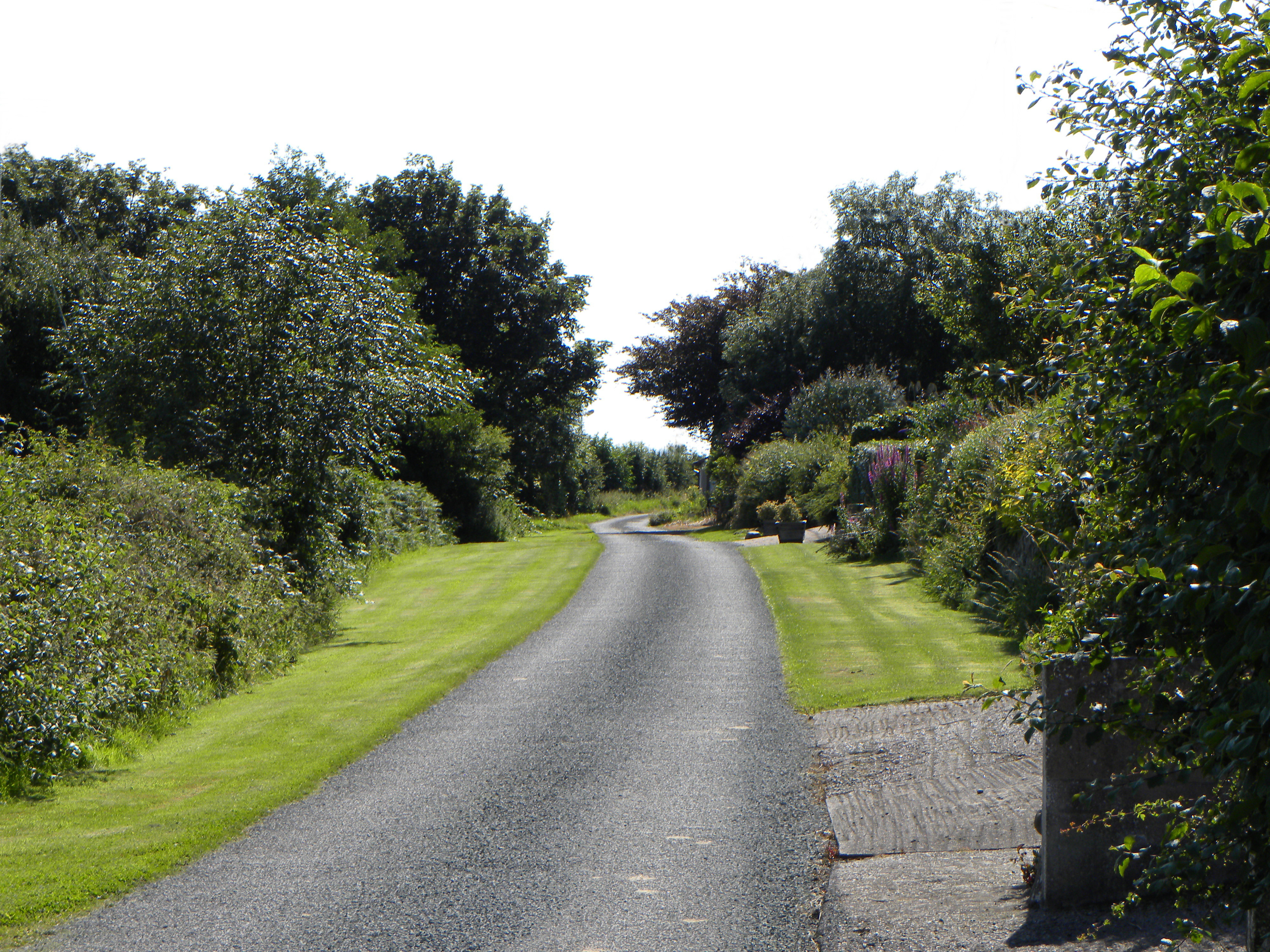
The road in Salta after being resurfaced in 2014.

On Salta Moss, an area of common land next to the hamlet, a Bronze Age rapier (a kind of sword) was discovered in the 1980s, proving that the area was settled by ancient Britons millennia ago. The rapier currently resides in the Tullie House Museum in Carlisle, and archaeologists date it as being crafted as early as 1100 BC. Two perforated axe-hammers and a polished axe dated to the Neolithic period were unearthed at nearby Mawbray. After the arrival of Romans in Britain, the area around Salta was fortified as part of the coastal defences which extended beyond the western end of Hadrian's Wall. By the 1550s, Salta participated in a system called "seawake", which was a night watch to guard the coast against incursions across the Solway by the Scots. These incursions were frequent, and on one occasion in 1592 at Dubmill, near Salta, a Mr Barwise the local miller was taken prisoner by Scottish raiders.

One of the properties in Salta is known to date from the 16th century, and the hamlet has been continually inhabited ever since. During the Second World War, 43 evacuees from the Newcastle-Upon-Tyne area were billeted to the parish of Holme St. Cuthbert, and several ended up in Salta. Development in the 20th century saw new houses built, but mainline water and electricity arrived later than in other parts of Britain, perhaps due to the small population. Excavations of a cropmark enclosure at Edderside, beyond the Moss to the southeast of Salta, were conducted in 1989–1990 by Robert H. Bewley. The Kelsick House wind turbine was approved for construction in 2013 in spite of local opposition, 6 miles (9.7 km) to the northeast, to the south of Abbeytown, and will join a number of other wind turbines in the area around Salta.

== Geography and farming ==
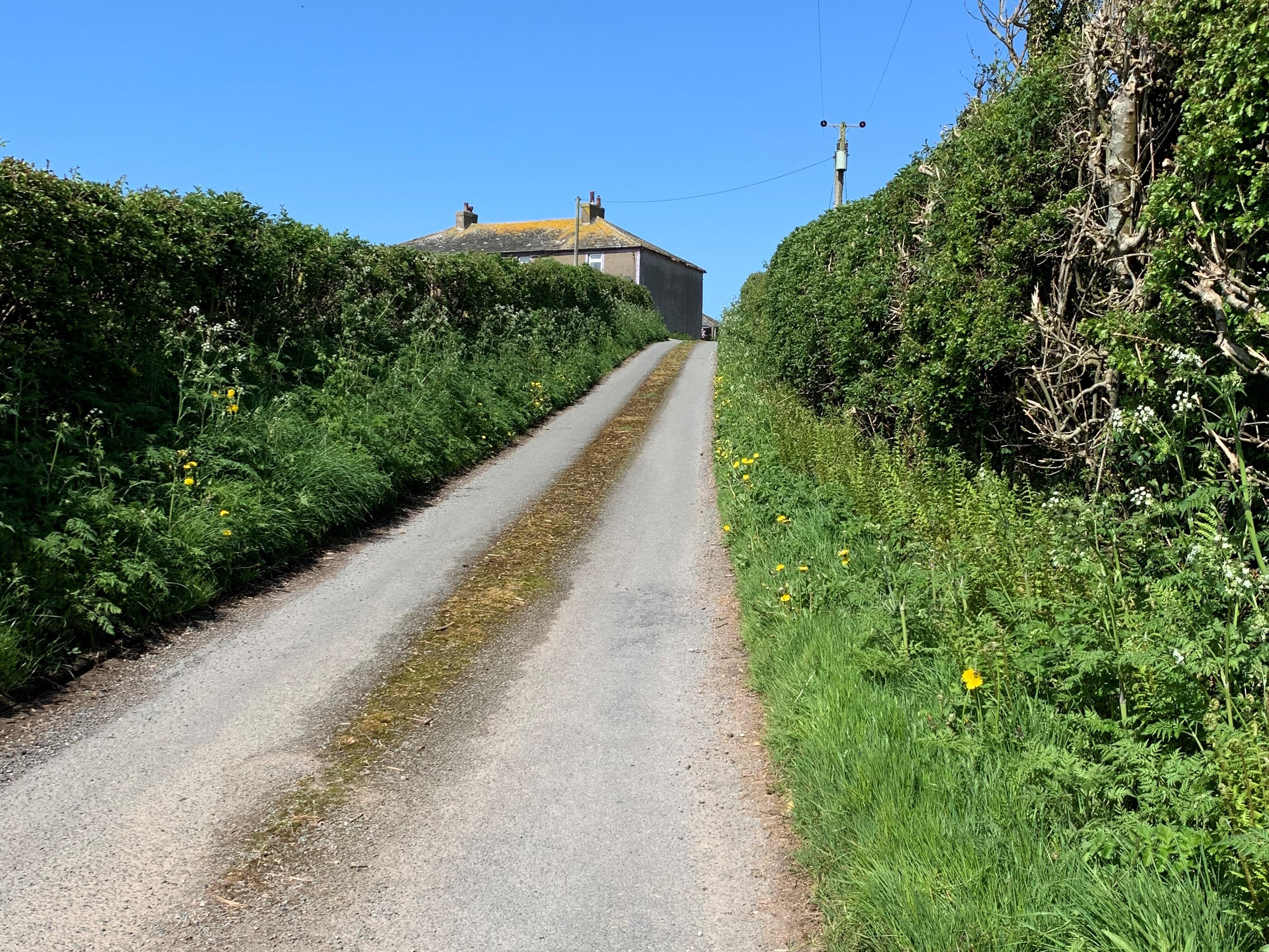
Looking up the hill at Salta.

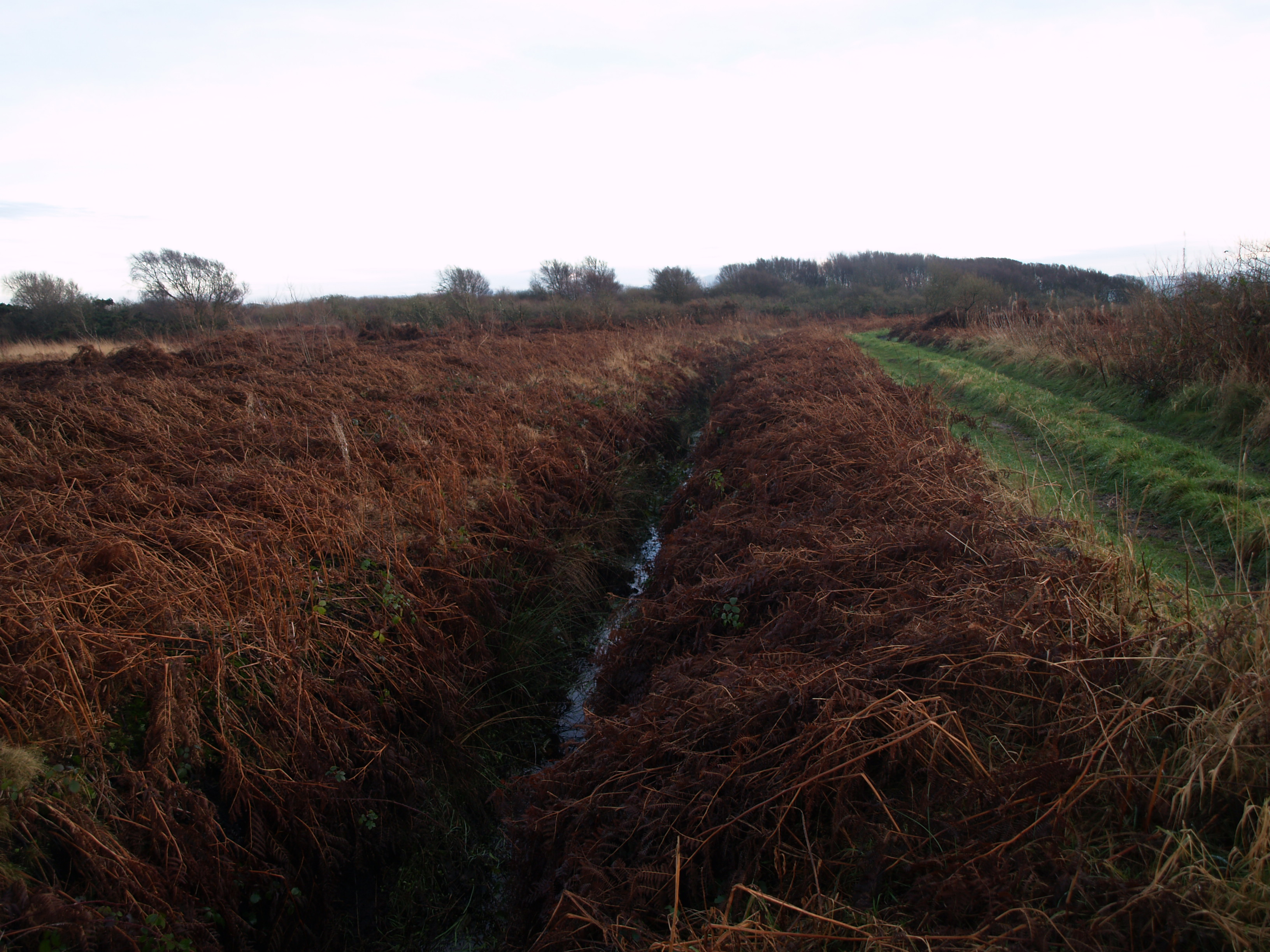
An irrigation ditch runs next to an unpaved track on Salta Moss.

Salta lies near the coast of northwestern Cumbria. By road it is situated 1.1 miles (1.8 km) south of Mawbray, 1.8 miles (2.9 km) north of Allonby, 2.3 miles (3.7 km) southwest of Holme St Cuthbert and 7.4 miles (11.9 km) southwest of Abbeytown. It shares very close community ties with nearby Mawbray, although the city of Carlisle provides wider amenities, some 25.1 miles (40.4 km) to the northeast. The shore of Allonby Bay, an inlet of the Solway Firth, is a mere half-a-mile to the west of the hamlet. A beck (a local word meaning "stream") flows through Salta, fed in part by irrigation channels. This beck eventually joins the Black Dub and drains into the Solway Firth at Dubmill.

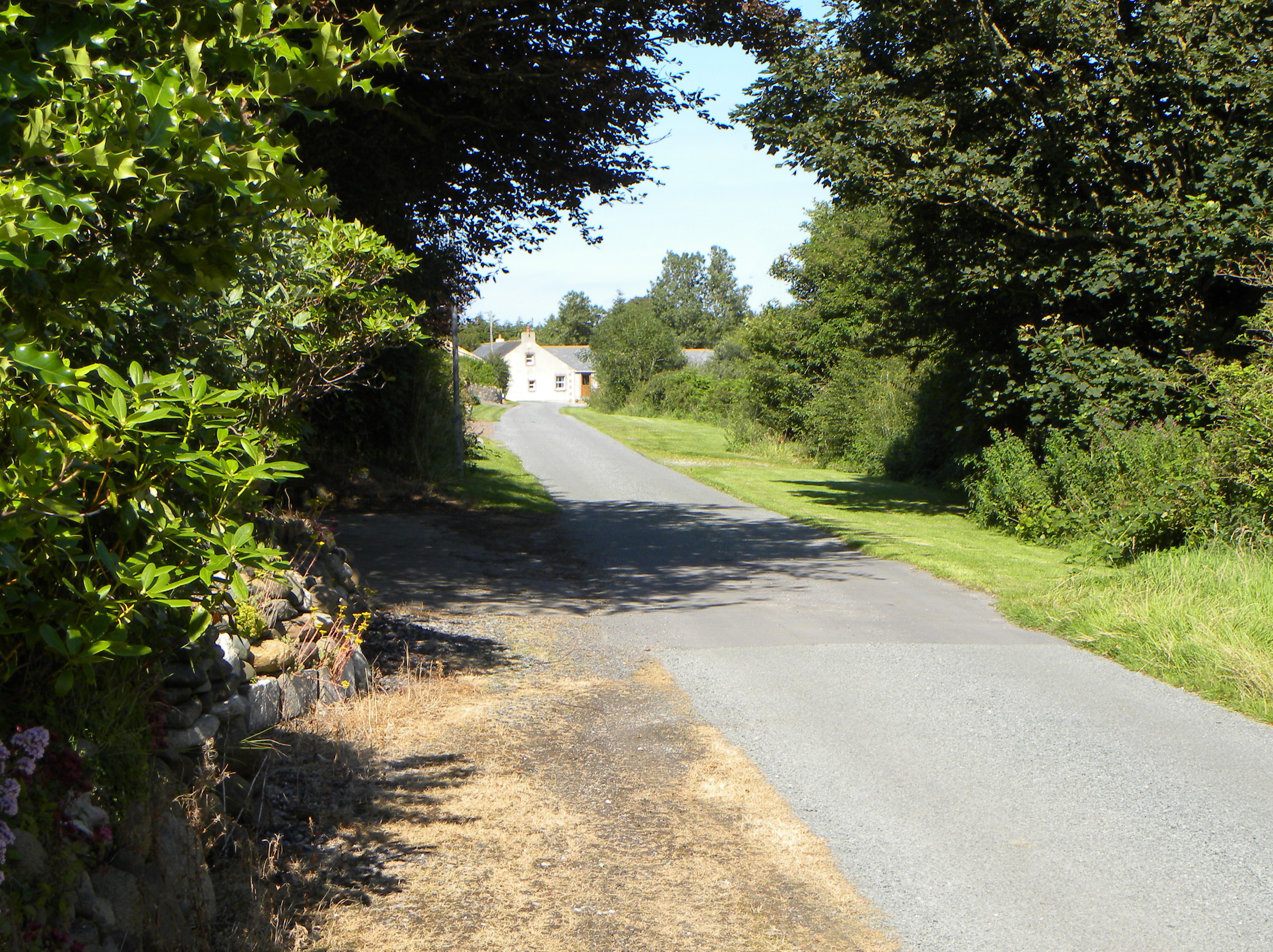
Salta looking towards the Northeast.

Salta Moss is a Site of Special Scientific Interest, both for its natural and historical significance, and is itself is located in a designated Area of Outstanding Natural Beauty which covers much of the Solway Plain. The Moss is an area of peatland, containing "mainly oligotrophic semi-fibrous grass-sedge peat" according to Soil Survey Record. It combines characteristics of both a raised bog and a valley mire, and lies atop deposits of glacial sand from the last ice age. It was designated an SSSI in 1954. Having been cut with irrigation channels, and been the site of burning and peat working, Salta Moss has different flora than other bogs or mires on the Solway Plain. The Moss today is common ground, but a track runs through it to provide access for local farmers to outlying fields, which surround it. An irrigation ditch has also been dug to provide drainage to the surrounding farmland.

There is some concern that areas of the Moss have been damaged or partly destroyed as a result of agricultural activity, including the digging of drainage ditches. Natural England, the agency responsible for the management of SSSIs in England, has suggested that no further irrigation channels should be dug, existing ones should not be deepened, and that the area should not be exposed to fertilisers or surface water run-off. Natural England further notes that the site's continued status as an SSSI depends on maintaining a high water table.

=== Climate ===
Salta, like the rest of the Solway plain, has an oceanic climate (Köppen climate classification Cfb), with mild summers and winters which generally avoid extremes of temperature. Salta has a cool climate, with average daytime highs of around 19 °C during July and August, and 6 °C during December. Overnight lows are 12 °C in July and August, falling to 2 °C in December, January, and February. Temperatures as high as 30 °C have been recorded in particularly hot summers, as have lows of −12 °C in winter. It is wet year-round, with rain or drizzle expected on 16 to 19 days of most months. Snowfall is relatively uncommon. Salta, and this part of the Cumbrian coast, can be subject to high winds especially during the winter months, with windstorms and gale-force winds most likely to occur between October and April. The hamlet avoided major flooding which hit the region in 2009, and escaped the worst effects of Storm Desmond in 2015. Severe weather warnings were in effect in December 2015 as Storm Desmond hit, including a "red" warning for rain indicating severely bad weather. Wind gusts in the area exceeded 80 mph (129 km/h) during this storm.

Climate data for Mawbray
Month	Jan	Feb	Mar	Apr	May	Jun	Jul	Aug	Sep	Oct	Nov	Dec	Year
Mean daily maximum °C (°F)	7 (45)	7 (45)	9 (48)	12 (54)	15 (59)	17 (63)	19 (66)	19 (66)	17 (63)	13 (55)	9 (48)	6 (43)	12.5 (54.5)
Mean daily minimum °C (°F)	2 (36)	2 (36)	3 (37)	4 (39)	7 (45)	9 (48)	12 (54)	12 (54)	9 (48)	7 (45)	4 (39)	2 (36)	6 (43)
Average precipitation mm (inches)	93.6 (3.69)	105.1 (4.14)	72.0 (2.83)	63.5 (2.50)	60.1 (2.37)	70.3 (2.77)	58.4 (2.30)	76.2 (3.00)	73.4 (2.89)	109.4 (4.31)	93.2 (3.67)	102.5 (4.04)	977.7 (38.49)
Source: World Weather Online

== Flora and fauna ==
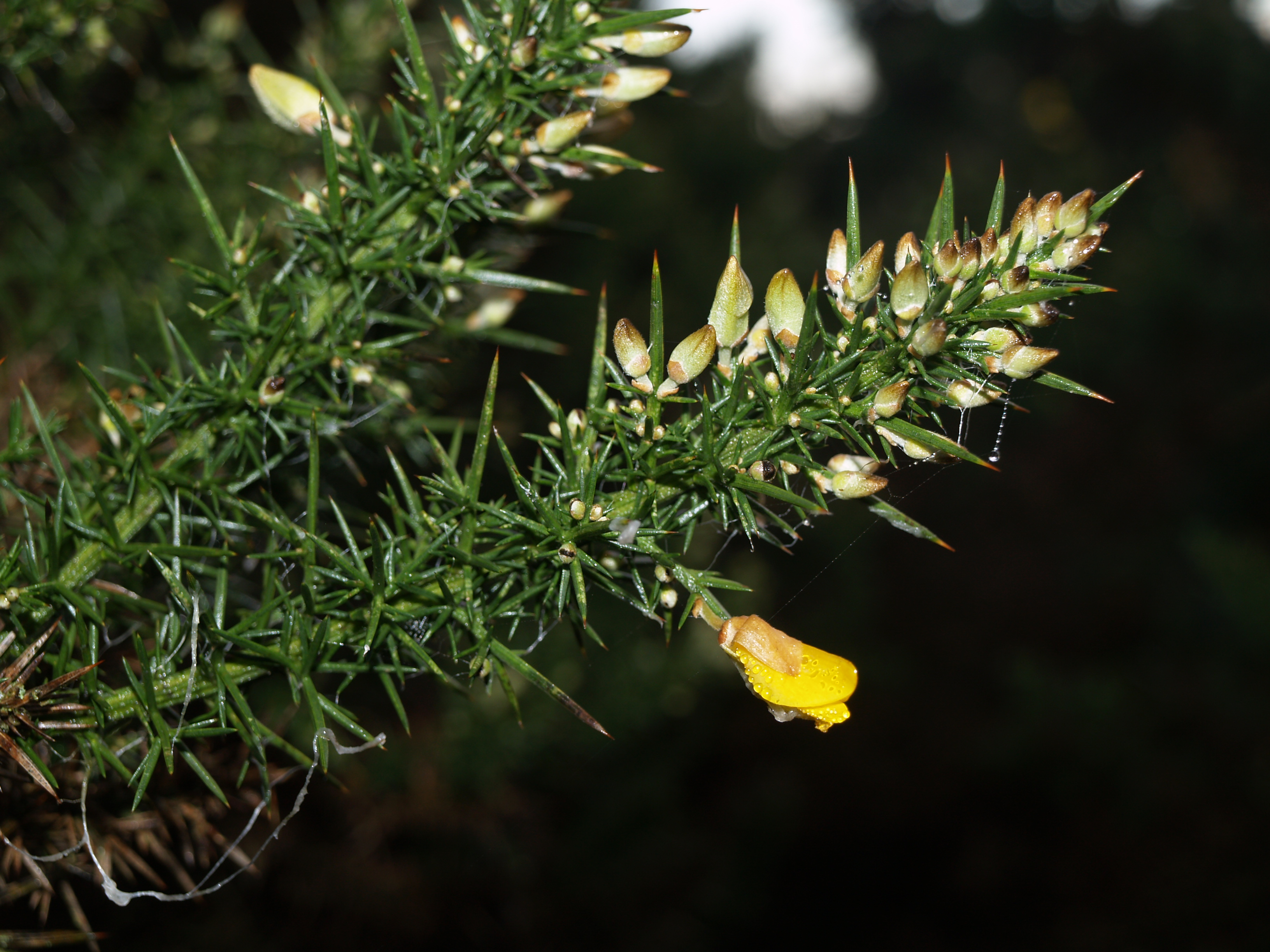
A gorse flower on Salta Moss, Cumbria.

Salta, and the Moss in particular, is home to a variety of plant and animal life, including some rare specimens. Adders, Britain's only native venomous snake, are seen on the Moss, and prey upon small rodents, such as voles. Many wild bird species inhabit Salta and the surrounding area, including larger species such as pheasants, which are also bred locally for hunting.

The Moss contains several varieties of heather, as well as the purple moor grass Molinia caerulea. Ferns and gorse are common too, and in areas where peat has been cut in the past, there are bog mosses, the bog bean Menyanthus trifoliata, and marsh pennywort.

== Landmarks and amenities ==
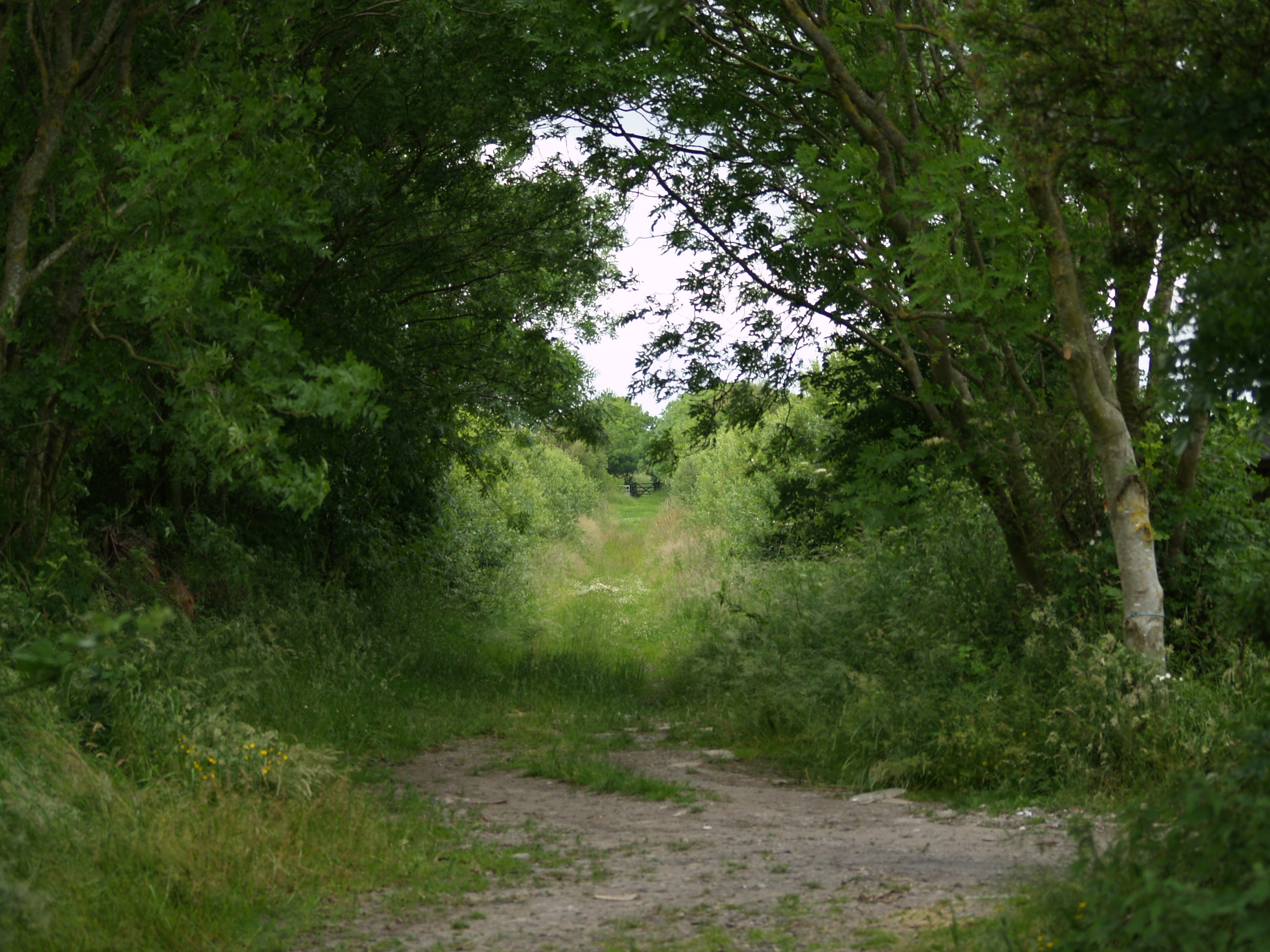
The public bridleway which leads from Salta to Mawbray.

Salta today is still a very small settlement, home to approximately 35 people. Most of the houses are fairly modern bungalows, such as those named Barnfield, Heather Moor, Moss View and Tamberry, although there are older two-floor cottages on either side of the hamlet. Another bungalow is named Anchorage, which features a ship anchor scheme on its gates.

There is still a functioning farm in Salta, which is passed on the lane accessing the hamlet. There are other farms in Mawbray and Allonby, and the hamlet is surrounded by farmland belonging to these local farmers. Though the road through the hamlet comes to a dead-end, and is accessed by lane only from the coastal B5300 road or Mawbray, two public bridleways at the end provide access over the fields to Hailforth and Mawbray, with the latter emerging right next to the pub in the centre of the village. A caravan park, Manor House Park, is situated across the peat to the southeast, to the southwest of the hamlet of Edderside.

Cumberland Council provides refuse collection, streetlighting, and other modern amenities. The nearest primary schools are Allonby Primary School in Allonby and Holme St Cuthbert School near Mawbray, and the nearest secondary school is Beacon Hill Community School in Aspatria. Modern Salta is a predominantly Christian community, though the local Church is located at Holme St Cuthbert, several miles away. As at 2014, a bus service runs between Silloth and Workington on the B5300 approximately every two hours, and can be requested to make a stop at Dubmill, near Salta.

Salta is part of the Penrith and Solway parliamentary constituency.
