= Listed buildings in Allonby =

Allonby is a civil parish in the Cumberland district in Cumbria, England. It contains 13 listed buildings that are recorded in the National Heritage List for England. All the listed buildings are designated at Grade II, the lowest of the three grades, which is applied to "buildings of national importance and special interest". The parish contains the coastal village of Allonby and the surrounding countryside. All but one of the listed buildings, a farmhouse, are within the village. They include houses, cottages, a Quaker meeting house, almshouses, a church and Sunday school, a hotel, and a milestone.

== Buildings ==
Name and location	Photograph	Date	Notes
Quaker Meeting House; 54.77681°N 3.42920°W	—	17th century	Originating as a cottage, it was converted into a Quaker meeting house in 1703, and extended in 1732. It is rendered with a green slate roof, and is in a single storey. The former cottage had two bays, and the lower extension to the left also has two bays. The doorway has pilasters, a fanlight, and a pediment, and the windows are sashes.
Bridge House Farmhouse; 54.77258°N 3.42921°W	—	1677	The house is roughcast over an irregular boulder plinth, and has a green slate roof. It has two storeys and four bays. The main door has a plain surround and a fanlight, and to the right is a doorway with an architrave. The windows are sashes, and those in the upper floor have hood moulds.
Moss House and Bouch House; 54.77590°N 3.42971°W	—	Early 18th century	Two adjoining houses, both with two storeys and Welsh slate roofs. Moss House is stuccoed, with three bays, a chamfered plinth, corner pilasters, an eaves cornice, and sash windows. The central doorway has an architrave, a fanlight, and a shell hood. Bouch house is lower, and has four bays. There is one casement window, the other windows being sashed.
Crookhurst Farmhouse and Cottage; 54.76927°N 3.41979°W	—	Early 18th century	Originally a farmhouse, later divided into two dwellings, it is roughcast with a green slate roof, in two storeys and eight bays. It has a chamfered plinth, quoins, and an eaves cornice. On the front are two 20th-century doorways, and a former doorway with a dated lintel. The windows are sashes, and at the rear is a 19th-century extension.
Christ Church and Sunday School; 54.76726°N 3.43097°W		1743–44	In 1845 transepts and a shallow chancel were added. The building is in sandstone with a green slate roof. It consists of a nave, transepts, a chancel, and a Sunday school parallel to the north. The windows in the church are round-headed with pilasters and false keystones; they are triple at the east ends of the chancel and transepts. In the school the windows are sashes.
Globe Inn Cottage and Easedale; 54.77248°N 3.42869°W	—	Mid 18th century	Originally an inn, it was later extended and divided into two houses. The building is stuccoed, and has a roof partly of Welsh slate and partly of tiles. There are two storeys and four bays. One of the windows is a casement, and the others are sashes. The earlier part has a doorway with an architrave, and the later part has a 20th-century doorway.
Woodlands and Edenvale; 54.77400°N 3.42966°W	—	Late 18th century	A house, later divided into two, it is pebbledashed and partly rendered with a green slate roof. There are two storeys with cellars, and four bays. The houses are on a chamfered plinth with quoins and an eaves cornice. Steps lead up to a doorway with a fanlight and a 20th-century porch. Most of the windows are sashes, and there is also a window with a pointed head.
Milestone; 54.76916°N 3.43094°W	—	Late 18th or early 19th century	The milestone consists of a round-topped stone inscribed with the distances in miles to Wigton and to Workington.
Ship Hotel; 54.77296°N 3.42950°W	—	Late 18th or early 19th century	The hotel is stuccoed on a chamfered plinth with quoins, an eaves cornice, and a green slate roof. It has three storeys and five bays. On the front is a 20th-century porch and doorway with an architrave. The windows are sashes, also with architraves.
North Lodge; 54.77864°N 3.42978°W		Early 19th century	A row of six almshouses and a central house, rendered, with angle pilasters, eaves modillions, and green slate roofs. The central house has two storeys and three bays, this is flanked on each side by two single storey two-bay cottages, and at the ends are two storey single-bay houses. The central house has a Tuscan porch and a door with a fanlight. The central house and the cottages have casement windows, and the end houses have sash windows; all the windows have architraves.
Rozenhof House and Roseacre; 54.77296°N 3.42950°W	—	Early 19th century	Originally one house, later divided into three dwellings, it is roughcast with a green slate roof. The house has a single-storey centre with two bays and this is flanked on each side by a two-storey single-bay wing. On the front are angle pilasters, a moulded plinth, and a porch with four Tuscan columns. Above the door is a fanlight, and the windows are sashes.
Solway View and West View; 54.77314°N 3.42955°W	—	Early 19th century	One house, later divided into two, rendered with two storeys, on a chamfered plinth, with quoins, an eaves cornice, and a green slate roof. Solway View has three bays, an Ionic doorcase, and sash windows. West View, to the left, has one bay, and on the left return is a two-storey projection containing a 20th-century doorway and a casement window above.
Allonby House; 54.77411°N 3.42966°W		1835	This originated as seawater baths and an assembly room, and has since been converted into a private house. It is stuccoed with rusticated stone dressings, and has a chamfered plinth, angle pilasters, a string course, a moulded cornice, and a green slate roof. There are two storeys and a front of five bays, the central three bays forming a portico with four Ionic columns, behind which are double doors with pilasters. The windows are sashes with plain reveals. At the rear is a verandah, a wrought iron balcony, and four French windows.
