= Black Dub (stream) =

Stream in Cumbria, England

Coordinates: 54.79153°N 3.39350°W

Black Dub Dub Stangs(from Langrigg to Westnewton)
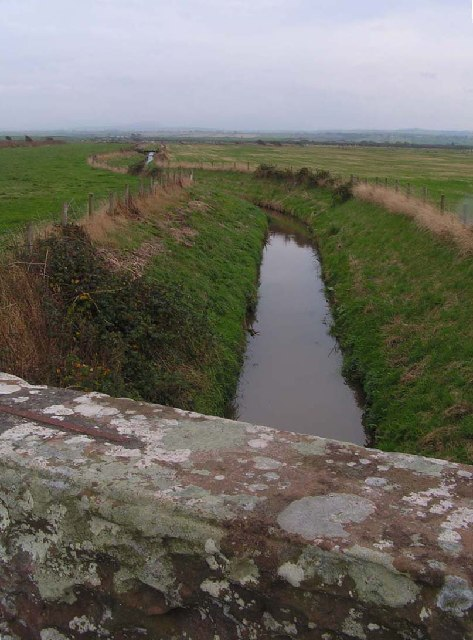
- The Black Dub approaching the sea near Old Kiln and Edderside.

Location
- Country: England
- County: Cumbria

Physical characteristics
- Source: Langrigg
  - location: Bromfield civil parish
- Mouth: Dubmill
  - location: Allonby Bay, Solway Firth
- Length: 7 mi (11 km)

Basin features
- Tributaries
  - right: Jordan Beck (Cumbria)

The Black Dub is a stream in Cumbria, England. It rises to the west of the village of Langrigg, in the civil parish of Bromfield, where it is known as Dub Stangs, and flows west past Scroggs Wood and the village of Westnewton. As it passes near the hamlets of New Cowper and Edderside it forms the southern boundary of the civil parish of Holme St. Cuthbert, and the northern boundary of the civil parish of Allonby, before entering the Solway Firth at Dubmill, at the northern end of Allonby Bay. It is seven miles (eleven kilometres) in length.

The stream appears in the historical record. In 1860, it was mentioned in the London Gazette, as the midpoint of the stream was to become the boundary between the townships of Langrigg and Mealrigg, and Westnewton. In 1969, an overflow channel was dug between the Black Dub and nearby Cross Beck, near the mouth of the streams. This was done by the Ministry of Agriculture, Fisheries and Food under the Water Resources Act 1963. It is classified as a "water feature" by Ordnance Survey. Numerous smaller irrigation channels serve as tributaries to the Black Dub, with the vast majority being within the civil parish of Holme St. Cuthbert. Its largest tributary is Jordan Beck, which rises near Jericho and flows through Plasketlands farm, Mawbray, and Salta, joining the Black Dub mere metres before it meets the sea.
