= Allonby Bay =

Bay of the Solway Firth in Cumbria, England

Coordinates: 54°46′N 3°27′W

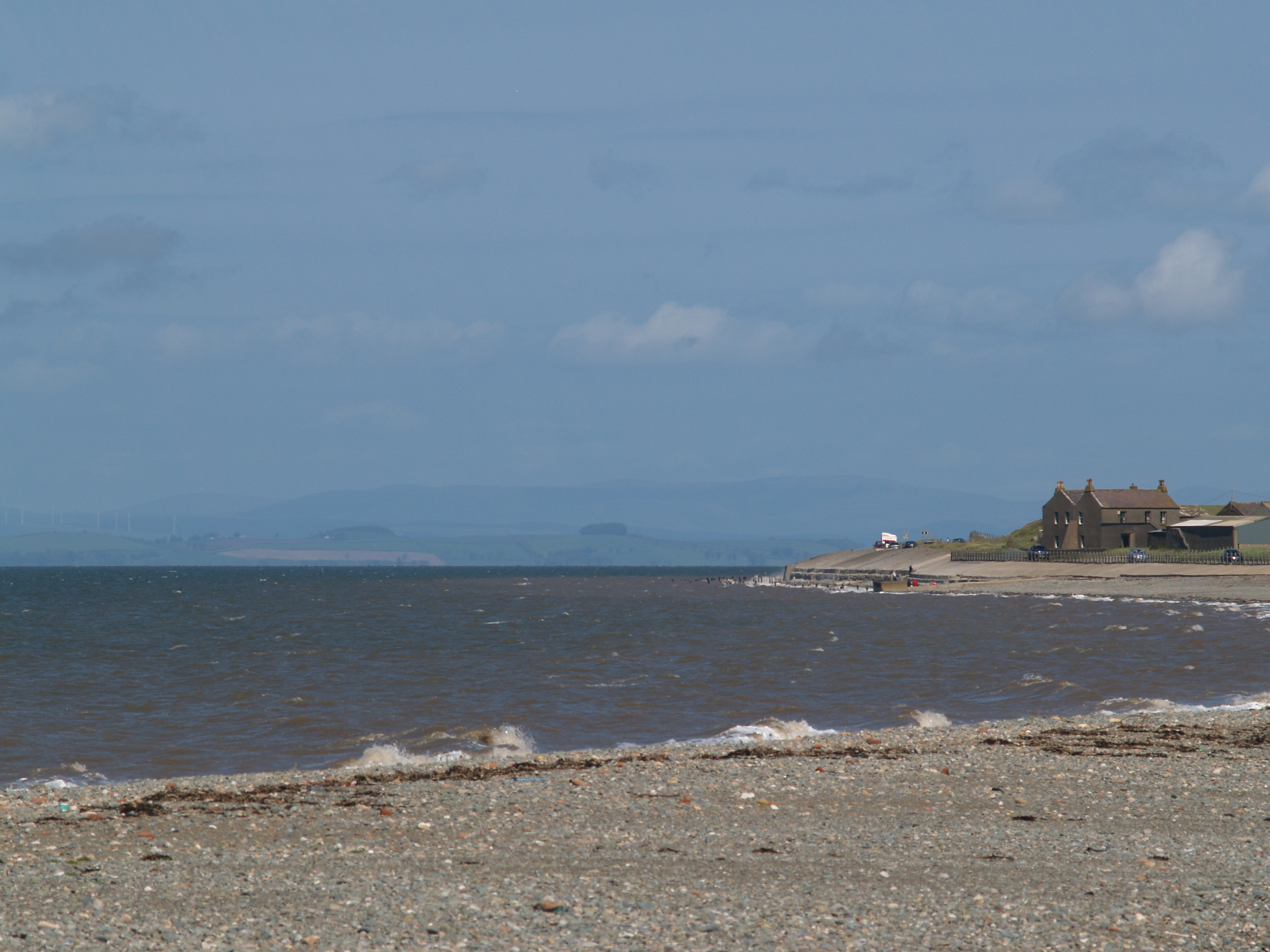
Looking towards Dubmill Point and Seacroft Farm from Allonby, the curvature of Allonby Bay is noticeable.

Allonby Bay is a crescent-shaped bay of the Solway Firth on the north-western shore of Cumbria, England. The bay is 5.5 miles (8.9 km) across. Its northern point is at Dubmill, between the village of Mawbray and the hamlet of Salta, and its southern end is just to the north of Maryport, near the village of Crosscanonby. The B5300 coast road follows the shoreline of Allonby Bay, running between Silloth in the north and Maryport in the south.

As an inlet of the Solway Firth, Allonby Bay is also part of the Irish Sea. The bay is named after the village of Allonby, which sits roughly in the centre of the shoreline.

== Geography and conservation ==
Allonby Bay has a 5 miles (8.0 km) stretch of beach which was awarded the coveted blue flag in 2005. However, following water quality tests in 2012, Allonby Bay was on the verge of losing its blue flag status, which caused much concern in Allonby itself, as the village relies on tourism as a major source of income.

Near the northern end of Allonby Bay is Salta Moss. This area is a designated Site of Special Scientific Interest within the Solway Coast AONB, and includes some rare plant and animal specimens, including the bog bean Menyanthus trifoliata, and Britain's only native venomous snake, the adder.

Several streams and becks enter the Solway Firth at Allonby Bay, including many fed by irrigation channels. One such example is the Black Dub, which flows into Allonby Bay at Dubmill.

The Lake District Coast Aquarium in nearby Maryport hosts a variety of aquatic life native to Allonby Bay, and has been a popular tourist attraction in the area since it opened in 1997.

=== Area of Outstanding Natural Beauty ===
Allonby Bay is in the Solway Coast Area of Outstanding Natural Beauty. It comprises a large part of the AONB's southern section, which runs from just north of the hamlet of Beckfoot to the southern tip of Allonby Bay near Crosscanonby.

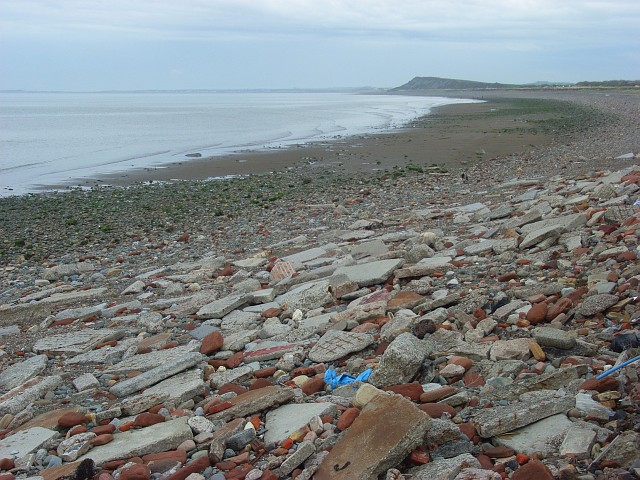
The southern part of Allonby Bay, near the village of Crosscanonby.

=== Highly Protected Marine Area ===
In 2016, Allonby Bay was made a Marine Conservation Zone. The MCZ covers a 5 miles (8.0 km) stretch of coast and 40 km^{2} (15 sq mi) of Irish Sea. The stated objectives of the Zone were to maintain sub-tidal sediments and sands (important spawning and nursery grounds for plaice, skate and thornback rays) as well as the reefs of the honeycomb worm (sabellaria alveolata). Reefs constructed by honeycomb worms host a variety of other marine life. Allonby Bay, which is at the northern edge of the species´ range, has good examples of such reefs.

As with other Marine Conservation Zones, the initial absence of a management plan caused some concern. In 2022 Allonby Bay was one of five sites that were proposed by Defra (Department for Environment, Food and Rural Affairs) as Highly Protected Marine Areas (HPMA). It was designated as such in July 2023.

== History ==
On Salta Moss, a Bronze Age rapier was discovered in the 1980s, and now resides at the Tullie House museum in Carlisle. Archaeological expeditions in and around the small communities along Allonby Bay have found evidence of human activity in the area dating back to the Neolithic period.

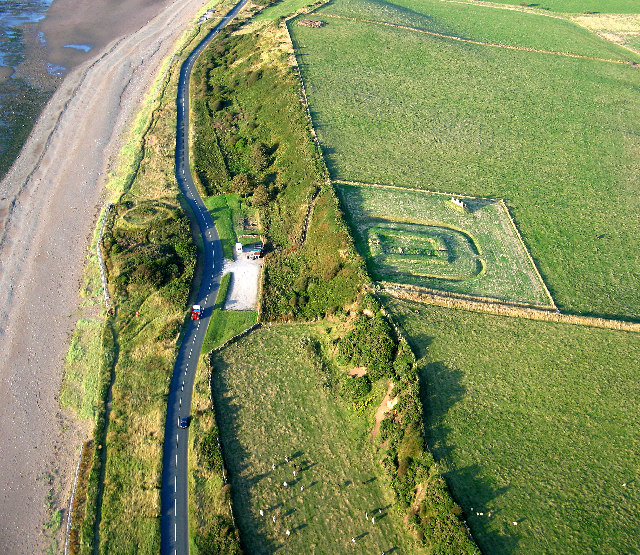
Milefortlet 21 from the air, with the B5300 coast road and the Saltpans.

During Roman times, Allonby Bay was home to several Roman milefortlets, small castles which extended beyond the western end of Hadrian's Wall to defend against incursions across the Solway. Milefortlets 17 to 22 were along the shoreline of the bay, and milefortlet 21 is the best-preserved.

Scottish coastal raids continued to be a problem well after the Romans left the area, however, and as late as the 1550s a man named William Osmotherly of Dubmill Point, near Salta, was taken for ransom in a Scottish raid. A system known as the "seawake" - a night watch along the coast - was created to defend against such incursions.
