= Solway =

Solway may refer to:

== Places ==
=== Australia ===
- Solway, a neighbourhood of Ashburton, Victoria. a suburb of Melbourne

=== New Zealand ===
- Solway, New Zealand, a suburb of Masterton

=== United Kingdom ===
- Solway Firth, the inlet between the north west of England and southern Scotland
- Solway Coast, designated Area of Outstanding Natural Beauty in northern Cumbria
- Solway Moss, lowland peat bog in Cumbria, England, near the Scottish border
  - Battle of Solway Moss, 1542 battle between England and Scotland
- Solway Plain, stretching from the edge of the northern fells of Cumbria (England) to the Solway Firth and for some miles around Carlisle, and also along the Scottish border of the Firth

=== United States ===
- Solway, Minnesota
- Solway Township, St. Louis County, Minnesota
- Solway, Tennessee

== People with the surname ==
- David Solway, Canadian poet
- Larry Solway, Canadian actor and broadcaster

== Ships ==
- ST Solway, a tug
- Solway (barque), a British ship wrecked on 29 December 1937 off the coast of Encounter Bay, South Australia
- Solway Lass, a tall ship
- Solway Harvester, a commercial trawler sunk off the Isle of Man in January 2000

== Other ==
- Solway Star F.C., a defunct Scottish football club
- Solway Group, a Swiss company
- Solvay (disambiguation)
