= Solovey =

Solovey or Solovei ("nightingale" in East Slavic languages) may refer to:

- Solovey (surname)

== Fictional characters ==
- Solovei the Brigand (Nightingale the Robber), a figure in Slavic folklore
- Yosele the Nightingale in Yosele Solovey, a novel by Sholem Aleichem

== Other ==
- Solovey (Alyabyev song), best known composition by Alexander Alexandrov Alyabyev (1787-1851).
- Solovey (Go_A song), Ukraine's Song for the Eurovision Song Contest 2020

== See also ==
- Soloway (disambiguation)
