= Solvay =

Solvay may refer to:

== Companies and organizations ==
- Solvay Brussels School of Economics and Management, Brussels, Belgium
- Solvay Institute of Sociology, Brussels, Belgium, part of the Université Libre de Bruxelles
- Solvay Process Company (1880–1985), a former U.S. company that employed the Solvay process
- Solvay S.A., an international chemicals and plastics company founded by Ernest Solvay

== Places ==
- Rosignano Solvay, a borough of Rosignano Marittimo, Italy
- Solvay, New York, a village in New York, United States
- Solvay Mountains, Brabant Island, off the coast of Antarctica
- Mount Solvay, part of Belgica Mountains in Queen Maud Land, Antarctica

== Buildings ==
- Solvay Castle, La Hulpe, Belgium
- Hôtel Solvay, a town house in Brussels, Belgium
- Solvay Hut, a mountain hut on the Matterhorn, Switzerland

== People ==
- Ernest Solvay (1838–1922), Belgian chemist, inventor of the Solvay process
- Lucien Solvay (1851–1950), Belgian journalist, art historian, and poet
- Paolo Solvay, pseudonym of Luigi Batzella (1924–2008), Italian film director and actor

== Other uses ==
- Solvay Conference, founded by Ernest Solvay, deals with open questions in physics and chemistry
- Solvay Public Library, a historic Carnegie library in New York, United States; on the National Register of Historic Places
- Solvay process, a major industrial chemical process
- 7537 Solvay, an asteroid

== See also ==
- Solway (disambiguation)
