= Solway Coast =

Area of Outstanding Natural Beauty in Cumbria, England

Coordinates: 54°53′N 3°20′W

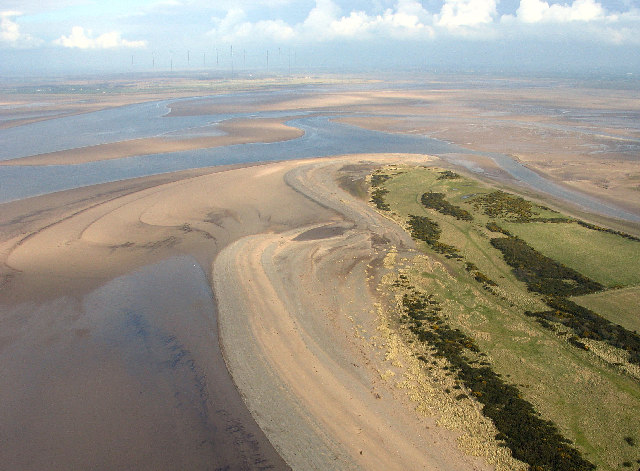
- Grune Point, Cumbria

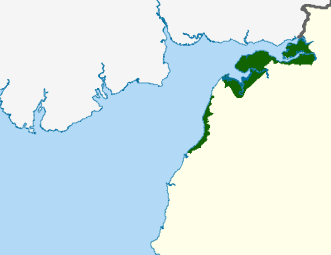
- Location: Cumbria, England
- Nearest town: Silloth
- Area: 118 km^{2} (46 sq mi)
- Established: 1996
- Governing body: The National Association for Areas of Outstanding Natural Beauty
- Website: https://www.solwaycoastaonb.org.uk

The Solway Coast is a designated Area of Outstanding Natural Beauty in northern Cumbria, England. It incorporates two areas of coastline along the Solway Firth, the first running from just north of the city of Carlisle, at the estuary of the rivers Esk and Eden, in a westerly direction as far as Silloth-on-Solway, including the villages of Bowness-on-Solway, Burgh-by-Sands, Port Carlisle, and Skinburness. The second area begins just north of the hamlet of Beckfoot, and runs south down the coast to the southern end of Allonby Bay near the village of Crosscanonby. Included in this area are the villages of Mawbray and Allonby, and the hamlets of Dubmill, Hailforth and Salta. The hamlet of Wolsty lies just outside the AONB. Beginning at Silloth, the B5300 coast road runs in a south-westerly direction, entering the AONB just north of Beckfoot, and exiting near Crosscanonby.

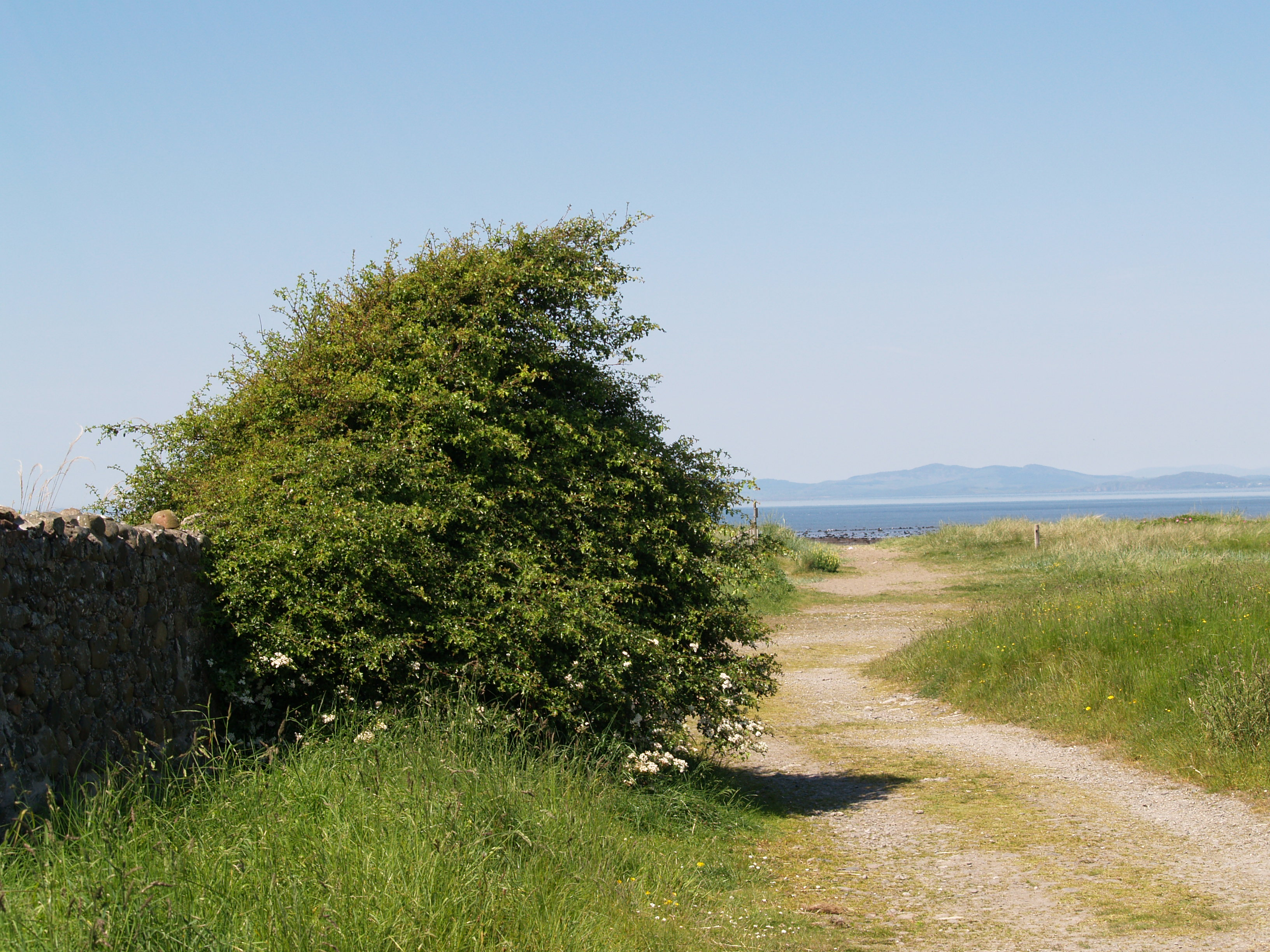
The track leading to the beach near Mawbray Yard, in the civil parish of Holme St. Cuthbert in the Solway Coast AONB.

== Status ==
Areas of Outstanding Natural Beauty in England and Wales are designated as such because of their beautiful scenery. The designating body is Natural England, and the reason for the Solway Coast's designation was to conserve what is considered one of the most scenic sections of English coastline.

=== Threats ===
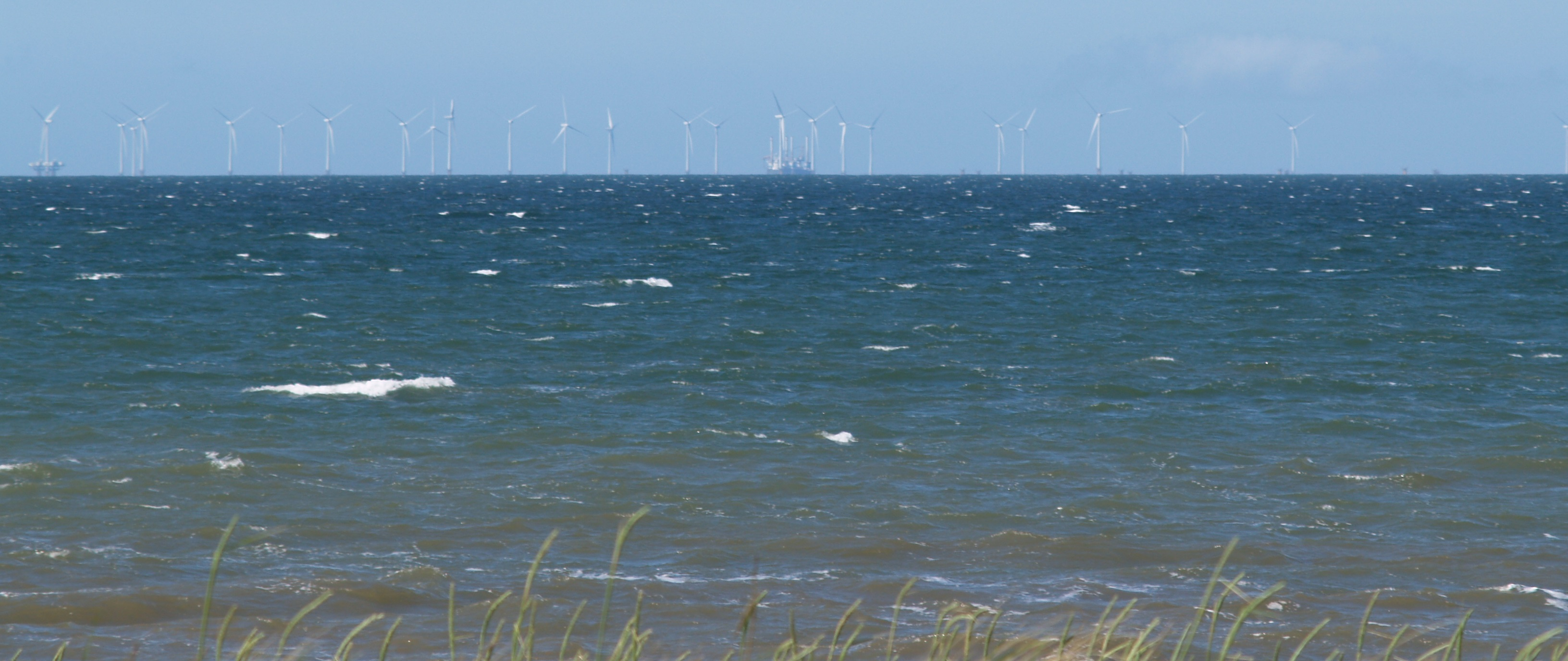
Robin Rigg wind farm (pictured here while still under construction in 2009) has proven controversial with residents and supporters of the AONB.

The Solway Coast was designated an AONB because of its scenic vistas. However, the massive increase in construction of wind turbines, both off-shore and on-shore, has left many residents feeling that the area's natural beauty is being tainted. The section of coast between Silloth-on-Solway and Sellafield has recently been dubbed "Britain's Energy Coast", something which many see as being incompatible with the Area of Outstanding Natural Beauty. However, the increase in investment brought by the establishment of the Energy Coast, as well as the promise of new jobs for an area which has seen higher than average unemployment following the closure of mines and factories in the 1970s and 1980s, has proven popular with many residents of the area.

== Flora and fauna ==
While an Area of Outstanding Natural Beauty is not designed to conserve wildlife or plants, a side-effect of conserving the landscape is the protection of the habitats of several species. Multiple species of butterfly, including some rare specimens, live on Mawbray and Wolsty banks, a designated Site of Special Scientific Interest within the Solway Coast AONB. Additionally, Mawbray and Wolsty banks along with Silloth dunes to the north are home to the very rare natterjack toad Bufo calamita and the great crested newt Triturus cristatus. These sand dunes are among only three in Cumbria, and are doubly protected by their status as an SSSI and an AONB.

== Solway Coast Discovery Centre ==
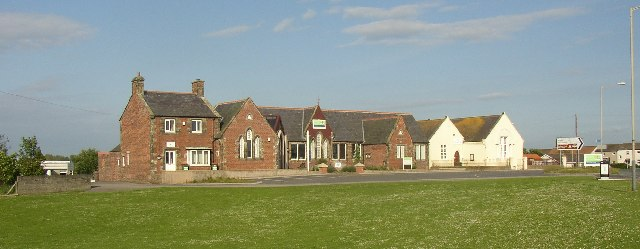
The Solway Coast Discovery Centre in Silloth.

In the town of Silloth-on-Solway is the Solway Coast Discovery Centre, an exhibition detailing the geography and history of the Solway Coast AONB. As of 2014, the centre attracts around 12,000 visitors per year, and also provides tourist information for other attractions within the AONB.

The main exhibition in the discovery centre looks at the wildlife, geography, and communities along the Solway Coast, and how things have changed over time, from the last ice age to the present day. This includes looking at the arrival of various groups which conquered the region, including the Romans, Vikings, and Normans, and how the establishment of the Abbey at nearby Abbeytown had an effect on the coastal region. The exhibition was designed to be interactive. There is also an art exhibition, where local artists showcase their work, as well as a cafe and a tourist information office.

To commemorate the 40th anniversary of the Solway Coast's designation as an Area of Outstanding Natural Beauty, a film was produced and is available on DVD at the Discovery Centre.

The Discovery Centre opened in 2002, and was funded by a number of local, national, and trans-national agencies, including Cumbria County Council, British Nuclear Fuels, and the European Regional Development Fund.

== Hills ==
As a low-lying coastal region, the National Landscape has very few hills. The only summit within the NL with 30 metres of topographic prominence is Alavna Roman Fort, 57 m (187 ft), with 46.3 m of prominence, grid reference NY041373, at the extreme south-western end of the area.
