= Hailforth =

Hamlet in Cumbria, England

Coordinates: 54°48′09″N 3°25′33″W

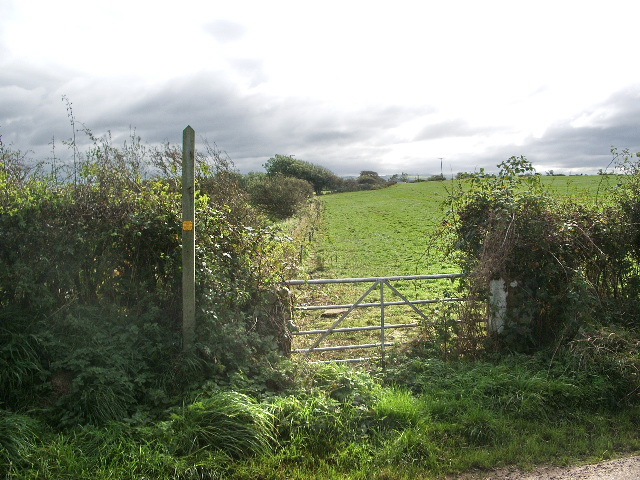
- This public footpath leads to the hamlet of Salta from the road near Hailforth.

- Location in Allerdale, Cumbria Location within Cumbria
- OS grid reference: NY086462
- Civil parish: Holme St Cuthbert
- Unitary authority: Cumberland
- Ceremonial county: Cumbria
- Region: North West
- Country: England
- Sovereign state: United Kingdom
- Post town: MARYPORT
- Postcode district: CA15
- Dialling code: 01900
- Police: Cumbria
- Fire: Cumbria
- Ambulance: North West
- UK Parliament: Penrith and Solway

Hailforth is a small hamlet in the civil parish of Holme St. Cuthbert, in Cumbria, England. It is located approximately half a mile south-west of the village of Mawbray, and a similar distance north-east of Salta. Carlisle, Cumbria's county town, is situated twenty-five miles to the north-east. The hamlet consists of four houses, and is situated on the road which runs from Mawbray to the coast, where it joins the B5300 at Dubmill, three-quarters of a mile to the south-west.

== History and toponymy ==
The name of Hailforth comes from the Old English healh-ford, meaning a corner or secret ford, and in the past has been spelled Haileforth. While its small size seems to have excluded the hamlet from contemporary mapping projects such as Google Maps, it does appear as a named settlement on older maps, and Hailforth appears in the historical record of the region. In the 19th century, several different trades were practised by residents of the hamlet, including carpentry, nail-making, and masonry. The postmistress for the village of Mawbray and many of the smaller outlying hamlets also lived at Hailforth around the turn of the 20th century. "Postie Mary", as she was known locally, would walk daily across the fields as far as Edderside to deliver the post, in spite of suffering a limp. During the Second World War, three young boys who had been evacuated from the Newcastle-Upon-Tyne area were billeted to Hailforth.

== Hailforth today ==
Hailforth remains very small, and overshadowed by its proximity to Mawbray some contemporary maps exclude it as a named settlement. There is, however, a business which operates in Hailforth: Newcroft Kennels & Cattery provides a safe environment for dogs and cats while their owners are away or on holiday. Hailforth is not served by public transportation; the closest stop on a regular bus service is three-quarters of a mile away on the B5300 coast road, where buses run approximately once every two hours in the direction of Maryport to the south and Silloth to the north.
