= Dubmill =

Settlement in Cumbria, England

Coordinates: 54.797°N 3.435°W

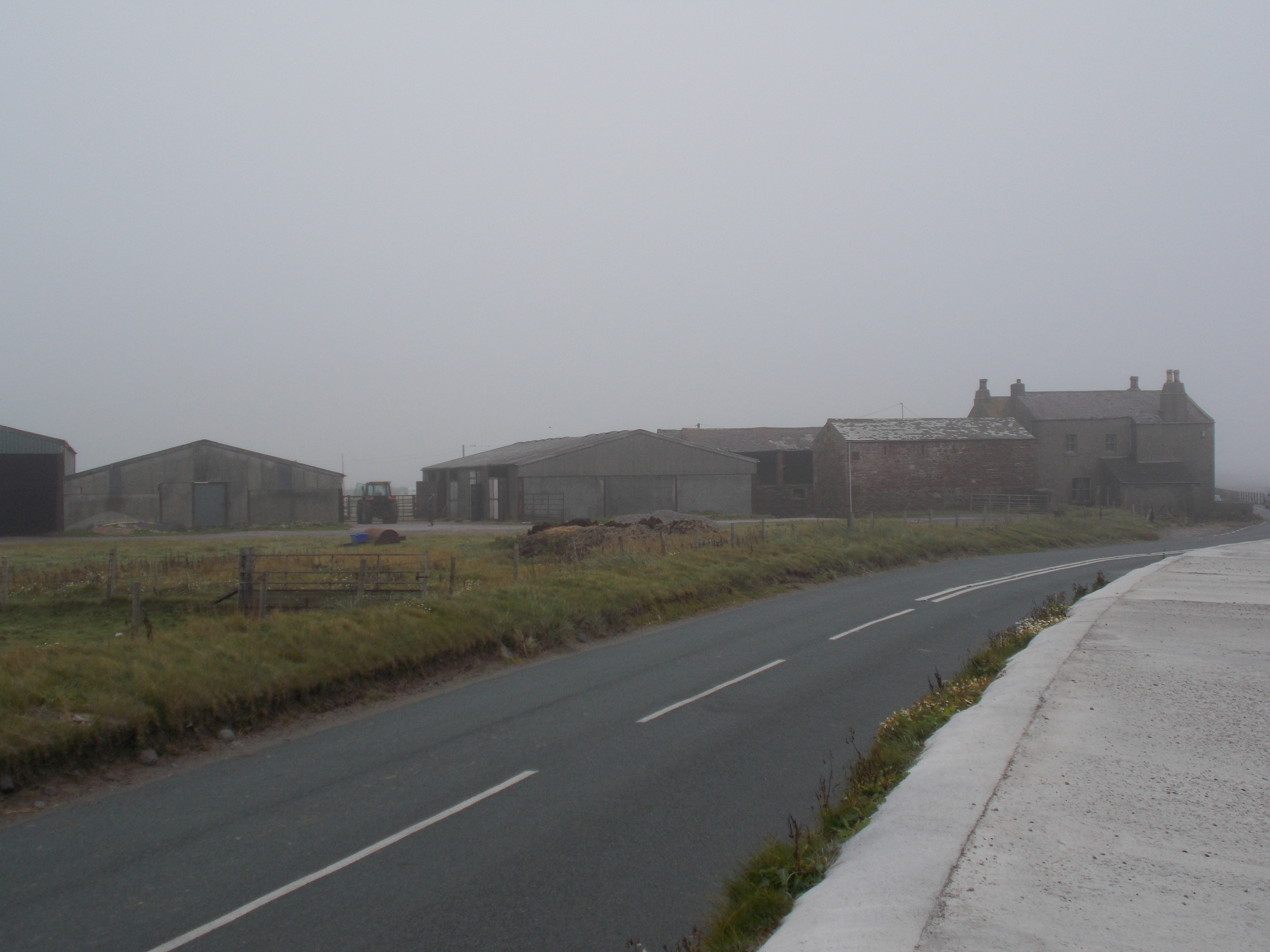
- A gentle mist rolls off the Solway Firth at Dubmill

- Location in Allerdale, Cumbria Location within Cumbria
- OS grid reference: NY077456
- Civil parish: Holme St. Cuthbert
- Unitary authority: Cumberland
- Ceremonial county: Cumbria
- Region: North West
- Country: England
- Sovereign state: United Kingdom
- Post town: MARYPORT
- Postcode district: CA15
- Dialling code: 01900
- Police: Cumbria
- Fire: Cumbria
- Ambulance: North West
- UK Parliament: Penrith and Solway

Dubmill is a settlement in the civil parish of Holme St. Cuthbert in Cumbria, England. It is located approximately one mile south-west of the village of Mawbray, half-a-mile to the west of the hamlet of Salta, three-quarters of a mile south-west of the hamlet of Hailforth, and one-and-a-half miles north of the village of Allonby. Carlisle, Cumbria's county town, lies approximately twenty-eight miles to the north-east. The B5300, known locally as the coast road, runs through Dubmill.

Dubmill lends its name to both Dubmill Point and Dubmill Scar. Dubmill Point is the name for the headland at the northernmost tip of Allonby Bay, and Dubmill Scar is the name for the rocky beach off Dubmill Point.

== History and toponymy ==
The name of Dubmill comes from the Old English dub-myln meaning "a mill at the pool". Historical variant spellings include Dubmil, Dubmilne, Dubhime, Dub-horn, and Dubbmill. A beck called the Black Dub runs near to Dubmill, and may be related to the name.

The area around Dubmill has been settled since before the Roman occupation, as a Bronze Age sword believed to date back to 1100BC was discovered on nearby Salta Moss. Dubmill, and the surrounding coastline from Carlisle as far south-west as Maryport, was fortified by the Romans. A series of milefortlets were placed along the coast beyond the western end of Hadrian's Wall to guard against coastal raids from across the Solway Firth. Milefortlet 17 was located at Dubmill, and would have been constructed from turf and timber. Its location has been discovered, though all that remains is a slight depression in the ground where one of the fort's ditches would have been.

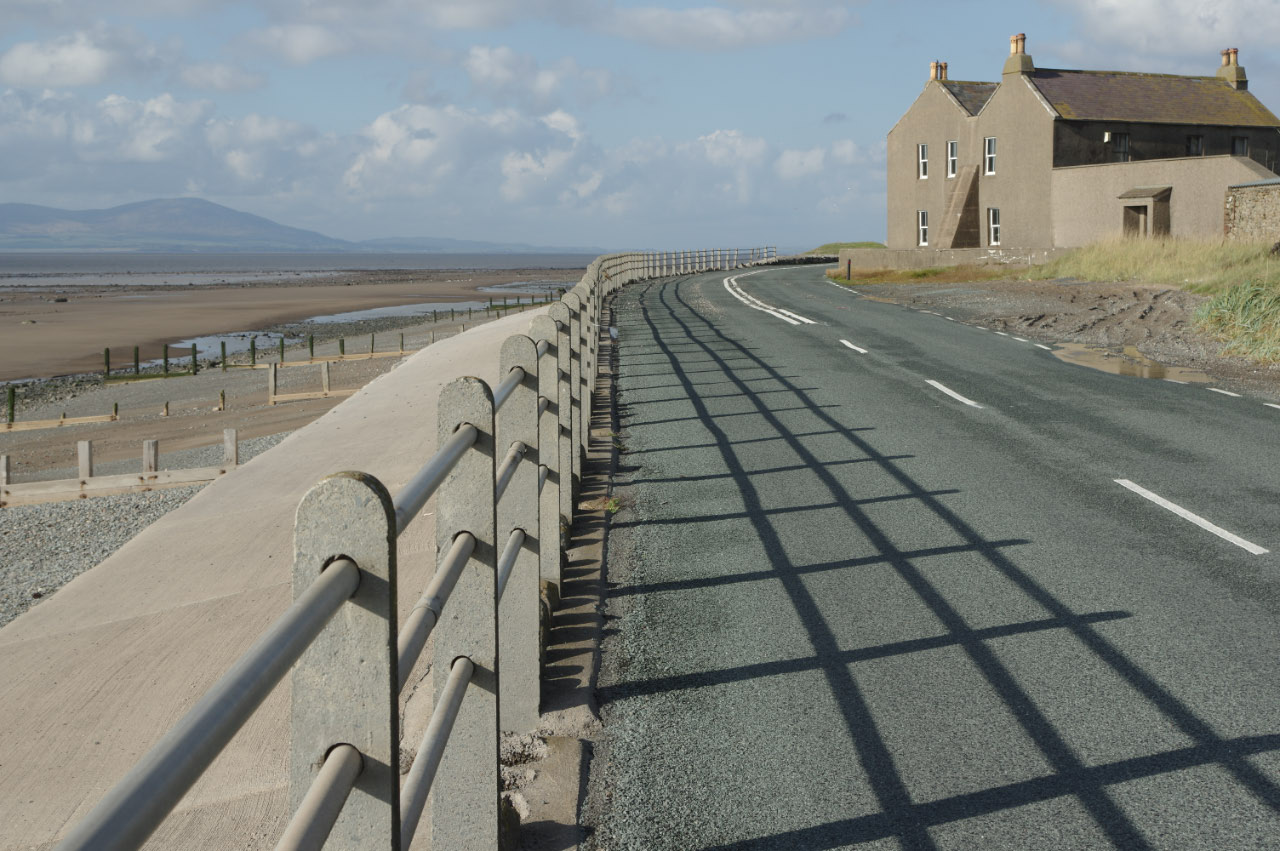
The B5300 coast road approaching Dubmill Point, north of Allonby.

A mill was present at Dubmill in the medieval period, and during the reign of Henry VIII in 1538 it was valued at £5.18s. Farmers from as far afield as Wolsty, four miles to the north-west, would have had to trek to Dubmill to grind their crops. They were also bound to assist in repairs to the mill and its associated dam as required by the miller. This continued through to at least the 17th century, and probably the 18th century before improvements in milling brought on by the industrial revolution would have rendered the mill at Dubmill obsolete. In its day, the mill would have been a substantial tower built from local sandstone, sturdy enough to withstand the force of the sea, which to this day sometimes crashes over Dubmill during a severe storm.

Dubmill is located on a stretch of coastline which was subject to raids across the Solway by the Scots even as late as the Tudor period. In 1592, a man named William Osmotherly, who lived at Dumbill, had his home broken into and was kidnapped for ransom by Scottish raiders. His losses were estimated at £200.

== Dubmill today ==
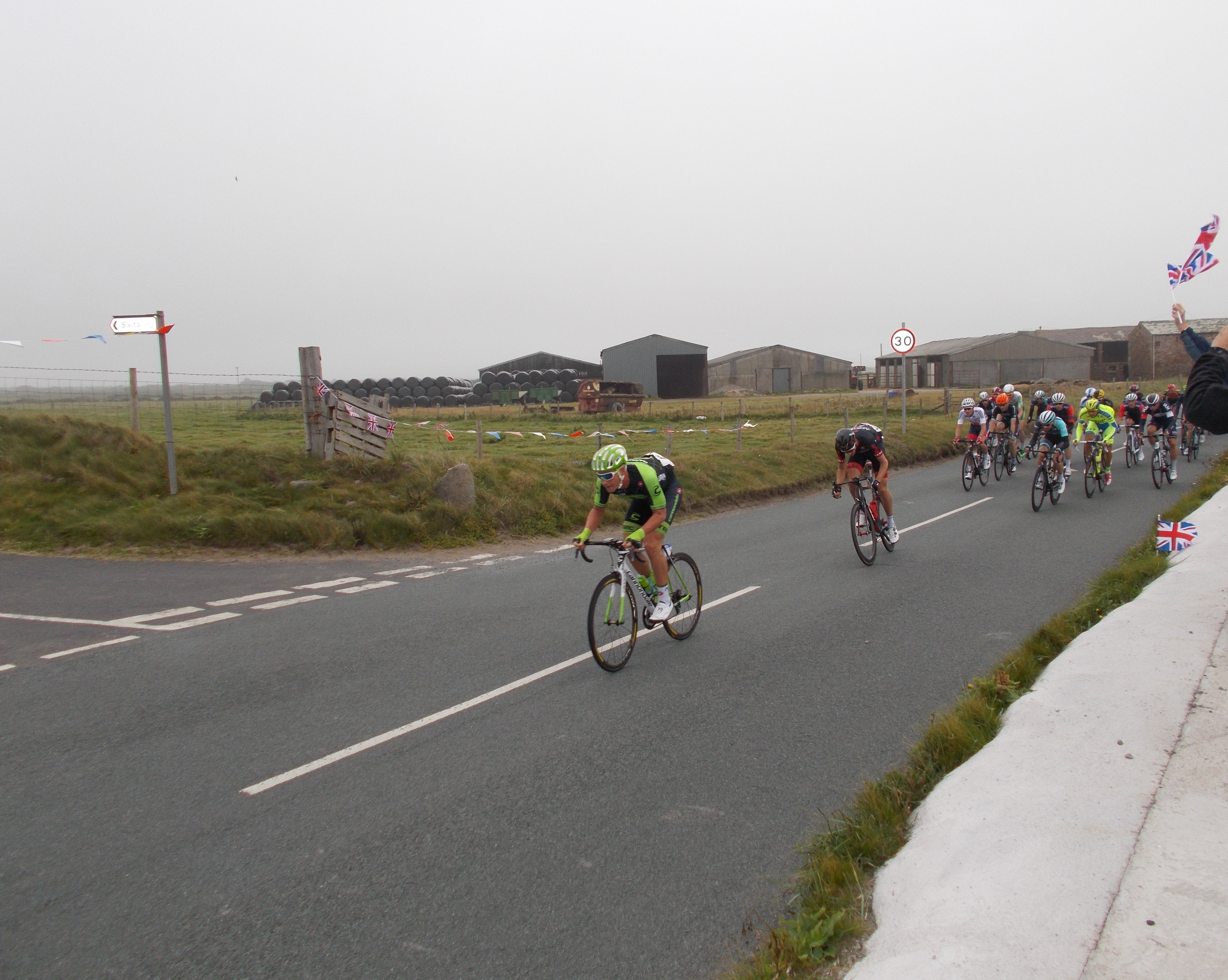
The Tour of Britain riders racing past Salta road end at Dubmill.

Dubmill is situated on the B5300 coast road, and is served by a bus which, as of mid-2015, runs between Silloth-on-Solway in the north and Workington in the south. The bus is run by local company Reay's, and calls once every two hours in either direction during the day. However, Dubmill today is a very small settlement, consisting of a single farm, and thus has no amenities or facilities of its own. In nearby Allonby, there is a convenience store, leisure centre, post office, fish-and-chip shop, and even an antiques shop, as well as several pubs and restaurants. There is also a pub in Mawbray, called The Lowther.

From November to December 2018, a public consultation called the Cumbria Coastal Strategy was held to evaluate and manage the risks related to coastal flooding and erosion along the Cumbrian coastline. The sea defences at Dubmill were assessed, and most were estimated to have between five and twenty years' life remaining. Two portions of sea defences near Dubmill were determined to have failed, including the portion opposite the Edderside road end at Oldkiln, and the rock armour north of Dubmill Point. The groynes at Dubmill were also determined to be in poor condition, and not achieving the required beach maintenance. Maintaining the beach in its current form was said to be necessary as the integrity of the concrete sea wall depends on it.

In February 2019 the B5300 coast road was closed at Dubmill due to coastal erosion. After new rock armour coastal defences were installed between Dubmill and Mawbray, the closed section of the road was able to re-open in June 2019. However, this part of the coastline is designated as being in managed retreat.

=== Events ===
In September 2015, stage three of the Tour of Britain came through Dubmill.
