= Allonby =

Coastal village in Cumbria, England

Coordinates: 54.7717°N 3.4313°W

- Village
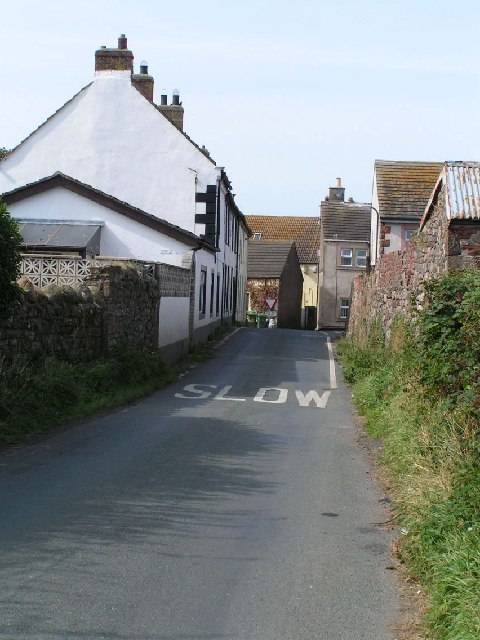
- Allonby, from the east

- Location in the former Allerdale district Location within Cumbria
- Population: 444 (2011)
- OS grid reference: NY081430
- Civil parish: Allonby
- Unitary authority: Cumberland
- Ceremonial county: Cumbria
- Region: North West
- Country: England
- Sovereign state: United Kingdom
- Post town: Maryport
- Postcode district: CA15
- Dialling code: 01900
- Police: Cumbria
- Fire: Cumbria
- Ambulance: North West
- UK Parliament: Penrith and Solway

Allonby is a village on the coast of Cumberland in Cumbria, England. The village is on the B5300 road 5 miles (8.0 km) north of Maryport and 8 miles (13 km) south of Silloth. The village of Mawbray is 3 miles (4.8 km) to the north, and 3.5 miles (5.6 km) to the east is the village of Westnewton, Carlisle is located 26 miles (42 km) to the north-east. Other nearby settlements include Crosscanonby, Edderside, Hayton, and Salta.

== Toponymy ==
The name 'Allonby' is derived from " 'Alein's bȳ'...'Alein' is a French personal name of Breton origin." ('Bȳ' is a late Old English word from Old Norse 'bȳr' and Swedish or Danish 'by' meaning 'village' or 'hamlet').

== Geographical aspect ==
The village overlooks Allonby Bay in the Solway Firth. The area is within the Solway Coast Area of Outstanding Natural Beauty, and the historic county of Cumberland. Allonby, and the five-mile coastal strip of the bay, has views across the Solway to the Galloway hills of southern Scotland. Both the South Saltpans beach and the West Winds beach were awarded the Blue Flag rural beach award in 2005. The village is located on the 150 miles (240 km) Cumbria Coastal Way long-distance footpath.

== History ==
From the late 18th century until the mid-19th century, Allonby was home to a small fishing fleet. The main catch was herring. Fish yards were built where these were salted and packed in barrels made on the premises. There was also a smokehouse where kippers were produced. In the early part of the 19th century, Allonby was a popular sea-bathing resort. Baths were built in 1835.

At the time of the 1841 census the population was 811.

The Reading Room, opened in 1862, was designed by Alfred Waterhouse, the Victorian architect, when he was only 32 years old. The building was largely financed by Joseph Pease, who was Britain's first Quaker MP.

== Governance ==
Allonby is part of the parliamentary constituency of Penrith and Solway, and has been represented by Markus Campbell-Savours of the Labour Party since the 2024 general election. Previously the village was represented by Mark Jenkinson, a member of the Conservative Party, who unseated Sue Hayman, a member of the Labour Party, at the 2019 General Election. The Labour Party had previously won the seat in every general election since 1979; the Conservative Party had only been elected once in Workington since the Second World War: in the 1976 Workington by-election.

For local government purposes, since 1 April 2023, it is in the unitary authority of Cumberland.

The village also has a parish council, Allonby Parish Council.

== Transport ==
As of March 2026, 1 route serves the village, the 60 to Workington or Skinburness operated by Stagecoach.

== Sport ==
The opening stage of the Tour of Britain Women's cycle race passed through Allonby in 2026.

== Notable residents ==
- Joseph Huddart was born here in 1741.

== See also ==
- Listed buildings in Allonby
