= Milefortlet 17 =

Milefortlet of the Roman Cumbrian Coast defences

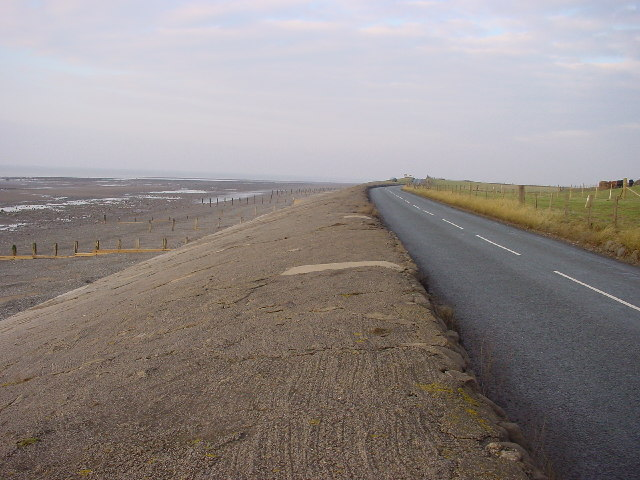
- Dubmill Point, and the approximate site of Milefortlet 17

- Location within the former Allerdale Borough Location within Cumbria
- 54.797251°N 3.437276°W
- Type: Milecastle
- Location: Cumbria, England

Milefortlet 17 (Dubmill Point) was a Milefortlet of the Roman Cumbrian Coast defences. These milefortlets and intervening stone watchtowers extended from the western end of Hadrian's Wall, along the Cumbrian coast and were linked by a wooden palisade. They were contemporary with defensive structures on Hadrian's Wall. There is little to see except a slight depression in the ground, but Milefortlet 17 has been located and surveyed.

== Description ==
Milefortlet 17 is situated at Dubmill Point, southwest of the village of Mawbray in the civil parish of Holme St Cuthbert. All that remains to be seen on the ground is a slight depression defining the ditch on the east and south sides.

The fortlet was thought to have been lost to coastal erosion, but was located on aerial photographs in 1977. Limited excavations were conducted in 1983, although the only finds were some pottery and nails. A geophysical survey was carried out in 1994 which showed the precise position of the milefortlet, surrounded on three sides by a ditch, with the fourth west side now being overlaid by the modern road.

== Associated Towers ==
Each milefortlet had two associated towers, similar in construction to the turrets built along Hadrian's Wall. These towers were positioned approximately one-third and two-thirds of a Roman mile to the west of the Milefortlet, and would probably have been manned by part of the nearest Milefortlet's garrison. The towers associated with Milefortlet 17 are known as Tower 17A (grid reference NY078451) and Tower 17B (grid reference NY075446). The locations of both towers are uncertain, and their positions have been estimated by measurement to adjoining Roman frontier works. It is possible that coastal erosion has destroyed one or both sites.
