= Tarns, Cumbria =

Settlement in Cumbria, England

Coordinates: 54.818°N 3.373°W

Tarns
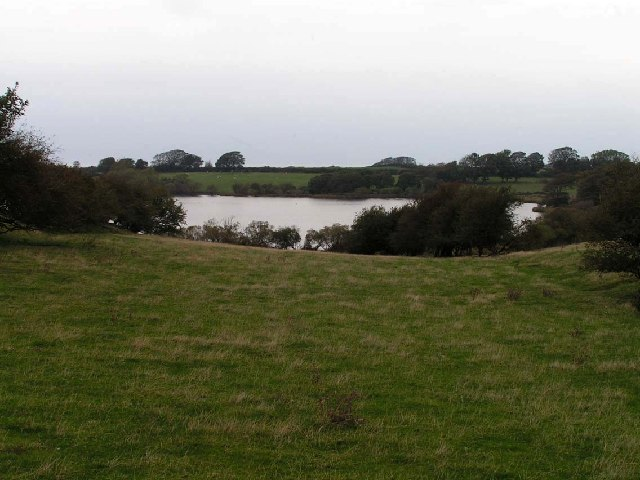
- The tarn from which the settlement derives its name

- Location in Allerdale, Cumbria Location within Cumbria
- OS grid reference: NY117478
- Civil parish: Holme St Cuthbert
- Unitary authority: Cumberland
- Ceremonial county: Cumbria
- Region: North West
- Country: England
- Sovereign state: United Kingdom
- Post town: WIGTON
- Postcode district: CA7
- Dialling code: 016973
- Police: Cumbria
- Fire: Cumbria
- Ambulance: North West
- UK Parliament: Penrith and Solway

Tarns is a small farming settlement in the civil parish of Holme St. Cuthbert in Cumbria, England. It is located two miles north-east of the village of Mawbray, and twenty-three miles south-west of Carlisle, Cumbria's county town. The B5301 road runs through the settlement, and along that road the town of Silloth-on-Solway is located five-and-a-half miles to the north, and Aspatria four-and-a-half miles to the south-east. Other nearby settlements include Aikshaw, Goodyhills, Jericho, and New Cowper.

== History and toponymy ==
The name Tarns comes from the Old Norse "tiorn", meaning a lake, and "tarn" is a word commonly used in northern England for a lake or pond. Such a lake is present at Tarns, giving the settlement its name. In the past, the name has been spelled as Ternis, Terns, and Tarnes.

Tarns is a small settlement, and, in spite of appearing on local signposts, including on the B5300 coast road, it is not named on some contemporary mapping projects like Google Maps. However, it does appear in the historical record, with records of births and deaths dating from at least the early 19th century. It is also noted on historical documents from the time of Holme Cultram Abbey's operation prior to the dissolution of the monasteries, where a farm owned by the abbey was operating at Tarns in or around 1200 AD.

The tarn for which the settlement is named has a surface area of 21 acres (8.5 hectares), and a perimeter of three-quarters of a mile (1.1 km).

== Local amenities ==
Tarns has no public transportation links, though a shuttle-bus is laid on to and from Aspatria railway station (the nearest station to the settlement) for visitors to Solfest during the August bank holiday weekend. The nearest stops on a mainline bus service are two-and-a-half miles away at either Mawbray or Beckfoot on the B5300 road, where services run every two hours in the direction of Silloth and Maryport, or alternatively four miles away at Abbeytown, where buses run from Silloth to Carlisle via Wigton.

Both nearby pubs, the Lowther Arms at Mawbray and the Swan Inn at Westnewton closed in the 2010s and the nearest restaurants and pubs are in Aspatria, Abbeytown, and Silloth. There is a tea room called The Gincase near Newtown and a garden centre at Bank Mill near Beckfoot which are both accessible by road from Tarns.

== Solfest ==
Tarnside Farm, one of the farms at Tarns, played host to an annual music festival called Solfest on the August bank holiday weekend. A portmanteau of the words "Solway" (from the Solway Plain) and "festival", Solfest started in 2003 and has attracted such artists as Badly Drawn Boy, Seth Lakeman, The Proclaimers, and Kate Rusby. The 2014 edition was cancelled, but the festival resumed in 2015. The 2020 edition of the festival had to be cancelled due to the COVID-19 pandemic.

An aerial photograph of Solfest in 2007.

In 2007, Solfest won an award for the "Best Family Festival". The full price for an adult ticket for Solfest 2012 was £95, with young people aged 12–16 paying £65, and children paying £35. Tickets for the final edition in 2019 were £105.19 for adults or £285.81 for a family of two adults and two children. Youth tickets, child tickets, as well day tickets were also available.
