= Mealrigg =

Settlement in Cumbria, England

Coordinates: 54.799°N 3.354°W

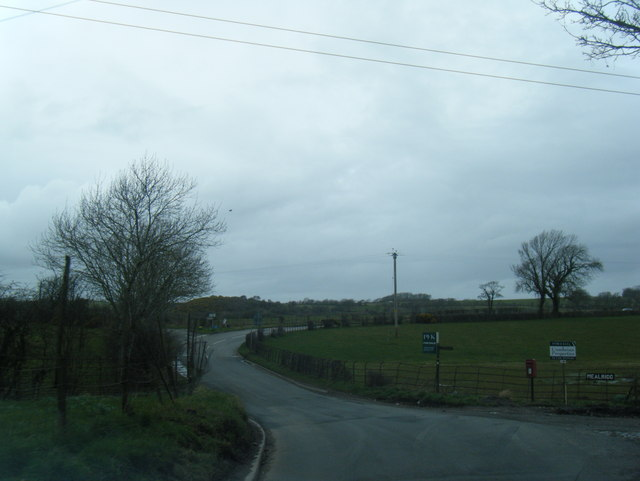
- B5301 road junction at Mealrigg

- Location in Allerdale, Cumbria Location within Cumbria
- OS grid reference: NY129457
- Civil parish: Westnewton
- Unitary authority: Cumberland
- Ceremonial county: Cumbria
- Region: North West
- Country: England
- Sovereign state: United Kingdom
- Post town: WIGTON
- Postcode district: CA7
- Dialling code: 016973
- Police: Cumbria
- Fire: Cumbria
- Ambulance: North West
- UK Parliament: Penrith and Solway

Mealrigg is a settlement in the civil parish of Westnewton, close to the boundary with the civil parish of Holme St. Cuthbert in Cumbria, England.

Mealrigg is situated one mile north-west of Westnewton, a quarter-of-a-mile east of New Cowper, and half-a-mile south of Aikshaw. Other nearby settlements include Jericho, Tarns, and Langrigg.

Historically, Mealrigg formed part of the township of Langrigg and Mealrigg.

== Toponymy ==
The name Mealrigg comes from the Old English middle-hrycg, meaning a middle ridge. There are several recorded variant spellings, including Midelrig, Meldrige, Milrig, and Meldrigg.

== Governance ==
Mealrigg is part of the parliamentary constituency of Penrith and Solway.
