= Cowgate, Cumbria =

Hamlet in Cumbria, England

Coordinates: 54.817°N 3.412°W

Cowgate
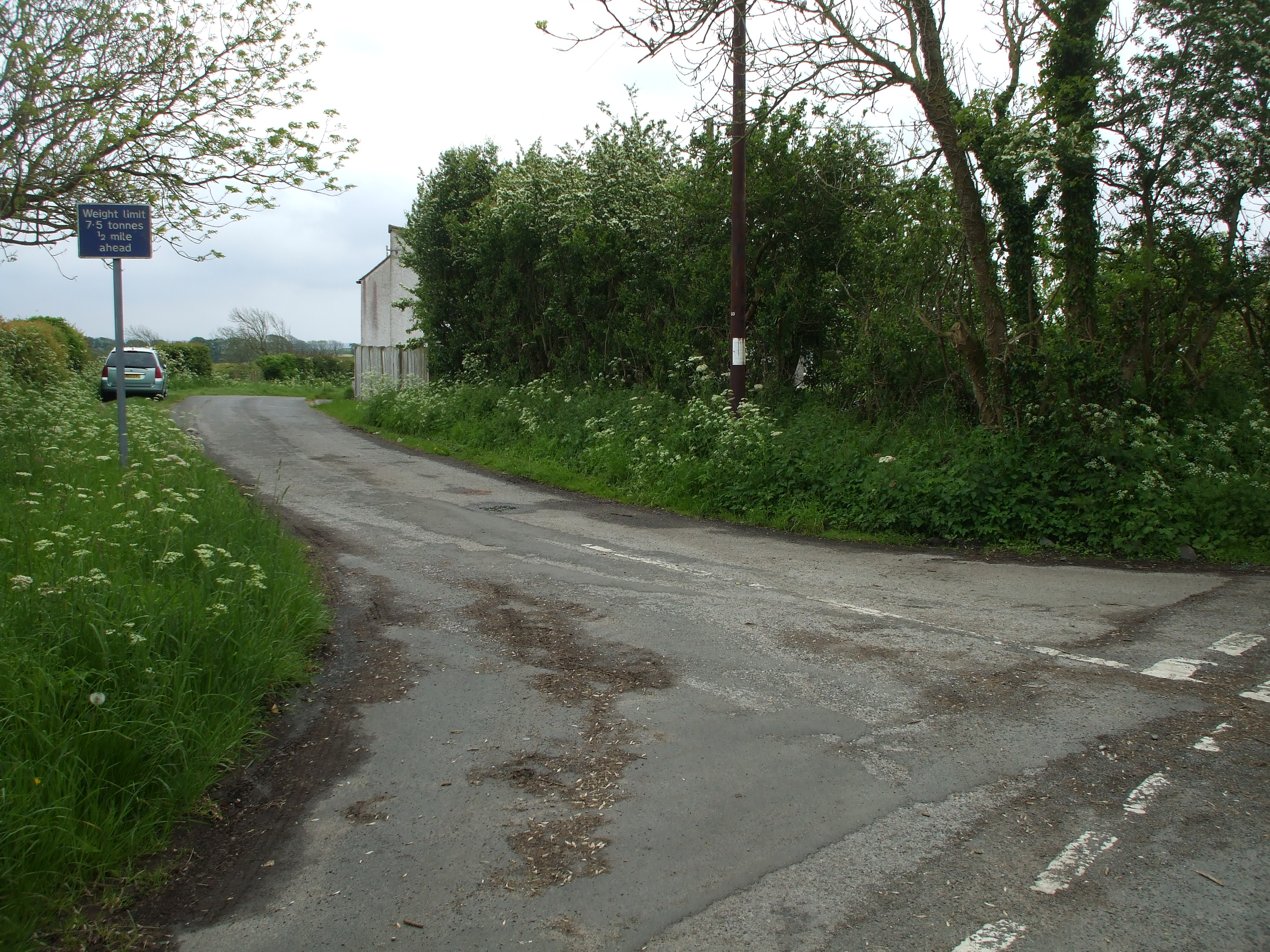
- Minor road junction at Cowgate.

- Location in Allerdale Location within Cumbria
- OS grid reference: NY092478
- Civil parish: Holme St. Cuthbert
- Unitary authority: Cumberland
- Ceremonial county: Cumbria
- Region: North West
- Country: England
- Sovereign state: United Kingdom
- Post town: WIGTON
- Postcode district: CA7
- Dialling code: 01900
- Police: Cumbria
- Fire: Cumbria
- Ambulance: North West
- UK Parliament: Penrith and Solway

Cowgate is a hamlet in the civil parish of Holme St. Cuthbert in Cumbria, England. It is situated approximately a quarter-of-a-mile south-west of Newtown, one mile north-west of the hamlet of Holme St. Cuthbert, and one-and-a-half miles north-east of Mawbray. Nearby settlements include Goodyhills, located one-and-a-quarter miles to the south-east, Hailforth, one-and-three-quarter miles to the south-east, and Beckfoot, one-and-a-half miles to the north. Carlisle, Cumbria's county town, is approximately twenty-four-and-a-half miles to the north-east.

== History and toponymy ==
The name Cowgate is derived from the Old English cu-gate, meaning a "cow pasture". Recorded variant spellings include Cowyate, Cowyeat, and Cowyeate.
