= Aikshaw =

Hamlet in Cumbria, England

Coordinates: 54.803°N 3.364°W

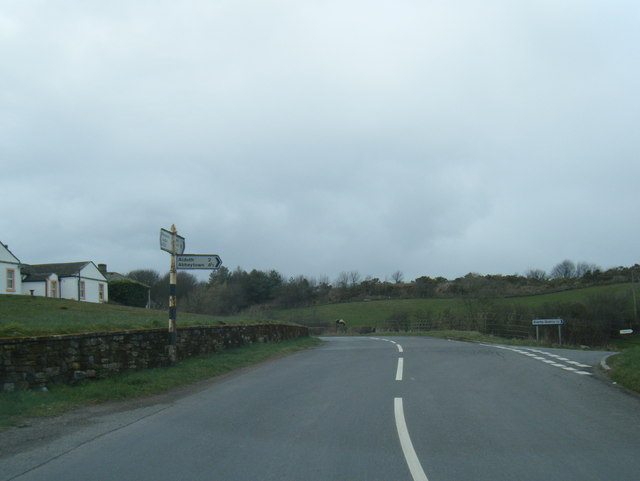
- The B5301 running through Aikshaw, with a side road leading to Abbeytown.

- Location in Allerdale Location within Cumbria
- OS grid reference: NY123462
- Civil parish: Holme St Cuthbert
- Unitary authority: Cumberland
- Ceremonial county: Cumbria
- Region: North West
- Country: England
- Sovereign state: United Kingdom
- Post town: WIGTON
- Postcode district: CA7
- Dialling code: 01697
- Police: Cumbria
- Fire: Cumbria
- Ambulance: North West
- UK Parliament: Penrith and Solway

Aikshaw is a hamlet in the civil parish of Holme St. Cuthbert in Cumbria, England. It is located approximately one-and-a-half miles north-west of the village of Westnewton, and three miles east of the village of Mawbray. Jericho is located approximately one mile to the east, with Edderside approximately a mile further to the south-east. Mealrigg is located half-a-mile to the south. Carlisle, Cumbria's county town, is located approximately twenty-two-and-a-half miles to the north-west. Aikshaw lies on the B5301 road, which runs from Silloth-on-Solway in the east via Tarns, Westnewton, and Aspatria to the A595 between Cockermouth and Bothel.

== Toponymy ==
The name of Aikshaw is derived from the Old English eik-sceaga, meaning an oak wood. Archaic variant spellings include Aykesom, Aikeshawehil, and Aikeshaw.
