= Milefortlet 15 =

Milefortlet of the Roman Cumbrian Coast defences

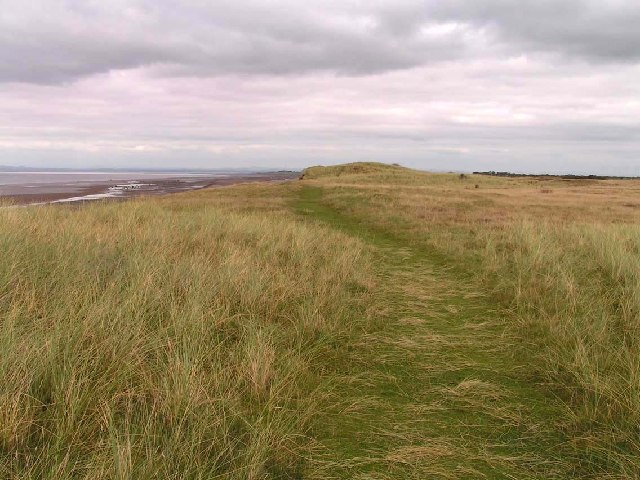
- The eroding cliff of Mawbray Bank in the vicinity of Milefortlet 15

- Location within the former Allerdale Borough Location within Cumbria
- 54.822535°N 3.42331°W
- Type: Milecastle
- Location: Cumbria, England

Milefortlet 15 was a Milefortlet of the Roman Cumbrian Coast defences. These milefortlets and intervening stone watchtowers extended from the western end of Hadrian's Wall, along the Cumbrian coast and were linked by a wooden palisade. They were contemporary with defensive structures on Hadrian's Wall. The site of Milefortlet 15 has been probably been destroyed by coastal erosion. A 3rd-century Roman cemetery, associated with a nearby fort at Beckfoot, was located in the area of the milefortlet.

== Description ==
Milefortlet 15 was situated on the cliff between the villages of Beckfoot and Mawbray, in the civil parish of Holme St Cuthbert. It was located 350 metres south-west of Bibra Roman Fort at Beckfoot. The site of Milefortlet 15 is believed to have been destroyed by coastal erosion. An eastern rampart was identified and excavated in 1954 with no results, and the site had fully eroded by 1980.

=== Roman cemetery ===
A Roman cremation cemetery was located next to Milefortlet 15, and was associated with Bibra Roman Fort and its surrounding vicus. Finds associated with the cemetery include Samian ware pottery and a bronze disc brooch. An excavation was conducted in 2006 in which eight cremation burials were recorded, which were dated from pottery finds to the 3rd-century.

== Associated Towers ==
Each milefortlet had two associated towers, similar in construction to the turrets built along Hadrian's Wall. These towers were positioned approximately one-third and two-thirds of a Roman mile to the west of the Milefortlet, and would probably have been manned by part of the nearest Milefortlet's garrison. The towers associated with Milefortlet 15 are known as Tower 15A (grid reference NY08504794) and Tower 15B (grid reference NY083475).

The site of Tower 15A is located on the summit of a high dune about 75 metres from the sea. Excavations were conducted in 1954 which revealed the eastern wall of a 6-metre square building. Fragments of pottery and other occupation debris were found. The site of Tower 15B has not been found, and the area is covered in high dunes.
