= Cowgate (disambiguation) =

Cowgate is a street and area of Edinburgh.

Cowgate may also refer to:

- Cowgate, Dundee, one of the medieval thoroughfares in the centre of Dundee, Scotland
- Cowgate, Newcastle upon Tyne
- Cowgate, Cumbria
