= Milefortlet 16 =

Milefortlet of the Roman Cumbrian Coast defences

- Location within the former Allerdale Borough Location within Cumbria
- 54.80967°N 3.428225°W
- Type: Milecastle
- Location: Cumbria, England

Milefortlet 16 was a Milefortlet of the Roman Cumbrian Coast defences. These milefortlets and intervening stone watchtowers extended from the western end of Hadrian's Wall, along the Cumbrian coast and were linked by a wooden palisade. They were contemporary with defensive structures on Hadrian's Wall. There is little to see on the ground but Milefortlet 16 has been located.

== Description ==
Milefortlet 16 is situated west of the village of Mawbray in the civil parish of Holme St Cuthbert. The site is among sand dunes on the coast and has been damaged by wind erosion and quarrying. Only the rear eastern rampart survives. Examination of the damaged remains of the rampart revealed two post-pits, presumably of a gate tower, and a cambered gravel road.

== Associated towers ==
Each milefortlet had two associated towers, similar in construction to the turrets built along Hadrian's Wall. These towers were positioned approximately one-third and two-thirds of a Roman mile to the west of the Milefortlet, and would probably have been manned by part of the nearest Milefortlet's garrison. The towers associated with Milefortlet 16 are known as Tower 16A (grid reference NY08124656) and Tower 16B (grid reference NY07834610).

Tower 16A was excavated in 1937 and two scraps of 2nd and 3rd century coarseware were found. Three large sandstone blocks in the vicinity may have come from the tower. Tower 16B was excavated in 1954. Foundations of the west wall and half of the north wall were found. Finds included pottery, three spear-heads and occupation debris. The outer face of the north wall, 15 centimetres high, is still visible on the ground.
