= New Cowper =

Hamlet in Cumbria, England

Coordinates: 54.795°N 3.367°W

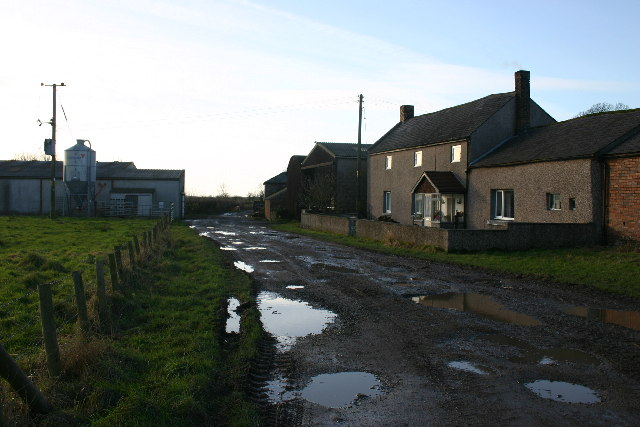
- A collection of farm buildings at New Cowper.

- Location in Allerdale, Cumbria Location within Cumbria
- OS grid reference: NY121453
- Civil parish: Holme St. Cuthbert
- Unitary authority: Cumberland
- Ceremonial county: Cumbria
- Region: North West
- Country: England
- Sovereign state: United Kingdom
- Post town: WIGTON
- Postcode district: CA7
- Dialling code: 016973
- Police: Cumbria
- Fire: Cumbria
- Ambulance: North West
- UK Parliament: Penrith and Solway

New Cowper (pronounced and occasionally written New Cooper) is a hamlet in the civil parish of Holme St. Cuthbert in Cumbria, England. It is located three-and-a-half miles south-east of the village of Mawbray, one-and-a-half miles north-west of Westnewton, and twenty-one-and-a-half miles south-west of Carlisle, Cumbria's county town.

== History and toponymy ==
The name New Cowper originally comes from the Old English "cu-byre", meaning a cow byre or cowshed. Hence, "New Cowper" means a new cowshed. It has previously been spelled New Couper, and even simply as Cowper or Couper, without the "New" prefix.

There is evidence of human activity in the vicinity of New Cowper dating back to the Neolithic period, as a polished stone axe and worked flint were discovered there. There is also evidence of Roman settlement and farming.

In the 1500s, a chapel existed at New Cowper, dedicated to Saint Cuthbert. A hermit named Richard Stanely was the sole occupant. Stanley had formerly been a monk at Holmcultram Abbey in Abbeytown, but it is believed he left the abbey, perhaps fearing for his safety, after Gavin Borrodaile became abbot. Stanley had testified against Borrodaile during the latter's trial for poisoning abbot Devis. The chapel was recorded in a 1538 survey as having "a little moss thereunto belonging", which is a small area of peat today known as Chapel Moss. The chapel stops appearing in the historical record by the mid-seventeenth century. However, the ground on which it once stood is still known today as Chapel Hill.

A small Congregational Chapel was built at New Cowper some time between 1883 and 1906. The chapel's founder, John Ostle, was a member of Aspatria's Congregational Church, and had become a deacon by 1901. He was the preacher at New Cowper, and his wife Agnes played the organ. Ostle died in July 1927, and the chapel was closed in 1948. In the 1970s, after being vandalised, it was demolished.

An inscription on the outside wall of the chapel paraphrased Luke 15:7:
There is joy in heaven over a sinner that repenteth.

== The hamlet today ==
Less than two hundred yards to the north-west is one part of the Overby sand quarry, where a large deposit of glacial sand left over from the last ice age is extracted by Thomas Armstrong, Ltd. As a result, large lorries transporting the quarried sand are frequently seen on the narrow road which passes by New Cowper.

In 2013, Allerdale Borough Council granted planning permission to convert a barn into two new dwellings at New Cowper. The barn in question is a listed building.

New Cowper is not served by public transportation. The nearest railway station is at Aspatria, three-and-a-half miles to the south-east along the B5301 road. Trains from Aspatria run north to Carlisle and south to Barrow-in-Furness, and occasionally Lancaster, along the Cumbrian Coast Line. There are also buses in Aspatria which run to Carlisle via Wigton, and to Workington and Whitehaven via Maryport. Three-and-a-half miles to the west, past the hamlet of Edderside, is the B5300 coast road, where a bus service runs every two hours between Maryport and Silloth.

== Geography and climate ==
New Cowper is located on the Solway Plain, less than three miles from the Solway Coast Area of Outstanding Natural Beauty. It is also less than two-and-a-half miles as the crow flies from the Salta Moss Site of Special Scientific Interest. Large deposits of glacial sand are present in the ground around the settlement.

New Cowper has an oceanic climate, Köppen classification Cfb, like the rest of the Solway Plain and indeed the county of Cumbria. Rain is present year-round, though it is more common in the autumn and winter months. Average temperatures in July reach 15 degrees Celsius, and in January drop to below 3 degrees Celsius.

Climate data for New Cowper
Month	Jan	Feb	Mar	Apr	May	Jun	Jul	Aug	Sep	Oct	Nov	Dec	Year
Mean daily maximum °C (°F)	5.6 (42.1)	6.3 (43.3)	8.5 (47.3)	11.7 (53.1)	15.1 (59.2)	18.0 (64.4)	19.1 (66.4)	18.7 (65.7)	16.0 (60.8)	13.0 (55.4)	8.6 (47.5)	6.2 (43.2)	11.6 (52.9)
Mean daily minimum °C (°F)	0.2 (32.4)	0.3 (32.5)	1.8 (35.2)	3.7 (38.7)	6.4 (43.5)	9.5 (49.1)	11.0 (51.8)	10.7 (51.3)	8.7 (47.7)	6.2 (43.2)	2.6 (36.7)	0.9 (33.6)	5.1 (41.2)
Source: Climate-data.org

== See also ==
- Listed buildings in Holme St Cuthbert
