= Beckfoot =

Hamlet in Cumbria, England

Coordinates: 54.8334°N 3.4130°W

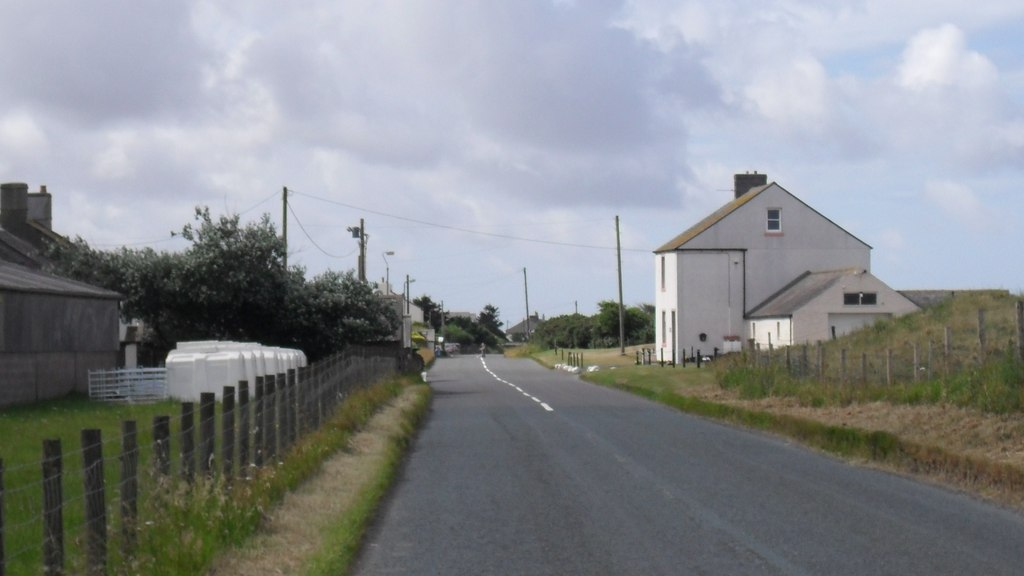
- North end of Beckfoot.

- Location in Allerdale Location within Cumbria
- OS grid reference: NY0949
- Civil parish: Holme St Cuthbert
- Unitary authority: Cumberland
- Ceremonial county: Cumbria
- Region: North West
- Country: England
- Sovereign state: United Kingdom
- Post town: WIGTON
- Postcode district: CA7
- Dialling code: 016973
- Police: Cumbria
- Fire: Cumbria
- Ambulance: North West
- UK Parliament: Penrith and Solway

Beckfoot is a hamlet in the civil parish of Holme St Cuthbert in Cumbria, England. It is located on the B5300 coast road, three miles south of Silloth-on-Solway and two miles north of the village of Mawbray. The county town of Carlisle is twenty-five miles away to the east.

== History and toponymy ==
The name "Beckfoot" is derived from the Old Norse bekkr-futr, meaning "the mouth of a stream". Beck is a local word in Cumbrian dialect for a stream. Such a beck empties into the Solway Firth at the southern end of the hamlet, and it is this watercourse which gives the settlement its name. There are two known recorded variant spellings: Beck and Beckfoote.

The area around Beckfoot was fortified during Roman times, as a series of milefortlets were constructed to guard the coast beyond the western end of Hadrian's Wall. The remains of milefortlets 14 and 15 are located nearby. In 2010 a broken pottery vessel containing 308 Roman coins was discovered by a local archaeologist using a metal detector.

During the 14th century, a castle was built at Wolsty, approximately one-and-a-half miles to the north, to guard the vulnerable Holmcultram Abbey at Abbeytown from raids across the Solway Firth. The castle had been demolished by the year 1700, and not much remains today, but an archaeological survey was carried out in July 2013.

In the 16th century, shifting sands and severe storms on the Solway Firth saw many houses in the hamlet destroyed or severely damaged. Many people lost their homes, and it was this event which prompted the Lord and Steward of Holme Culterham to construct the town of New Mawbray, today known as Newtown, three-quarters of a mile inland from Beckfoot. Also during this era, Scots continued to raid this section of the Solway coast. A system called the "seawake" - a night watch along the coast - was created, and residents of coastal communities including Beckfoot would have participated in guarding against such raids.

A Quaker meeting house was built in Beckfoot in the year 1745, exactly 100 years before the parish church at Holme St. Cuthbert was built. A mill and dam were built at the end of the eighteenth century to aid in local wool production, but the mill was not a financial success and closed a few years later. In 1925, Beckfoot had two council houses constructed - the only council houses in the whole parish.

== The hamlet today ==
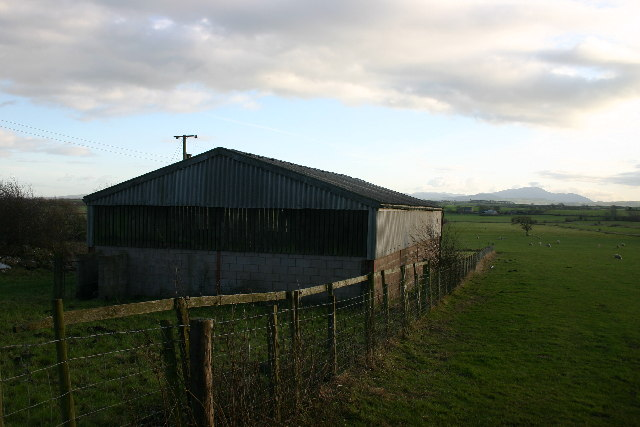
A barn belonging to one of the farms in the hamlet, looking inland across the Solway Plain toward Skiddaw.

There are two attractions in the vicinity - Bank Mill Nursery and Visitor Centre, which includes a garden, nature reserve, play area, and restaurant, and the Gincase near Newtown, a farm park with a gift shop and tea room.

A bus service runs between Silloth-on-Solway and Maryport and stops approximately once every two hours in either direction.

Beckfoot is within the Solway Coast Area of Outstanding Natural Beauty, and its sand dunes, together with those at Mawbray and Wolsty, form a Site of Special Scientific Interest.

== See also ==
- Listed buildings in Holme St Cuthbert
