= Milefortlet 14 =

Milefortlet of the Roman Cumbrian Coast defences

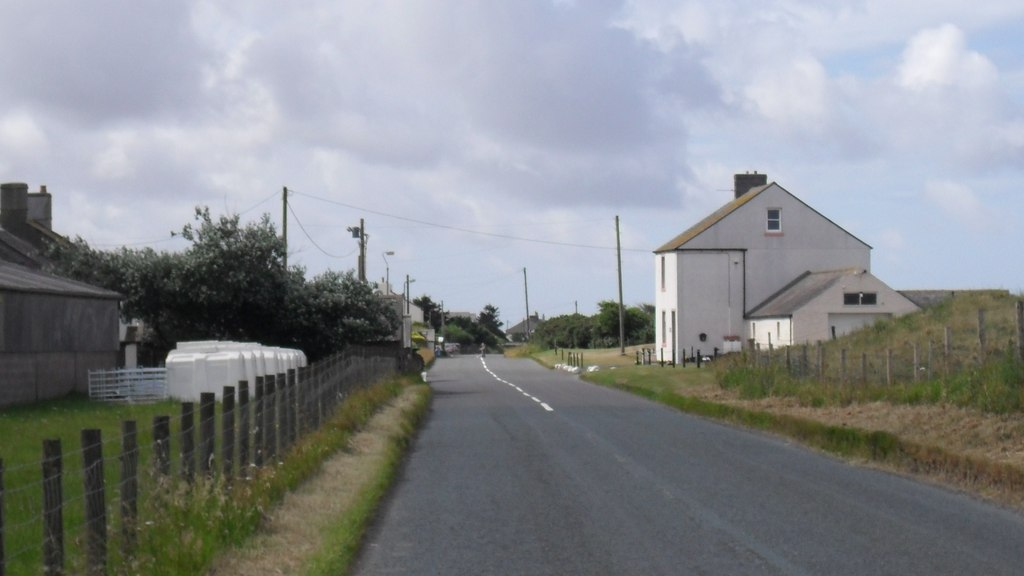
- North end of Beckfoot, and the approximate site of Milefortlet 14

- Location within the former Allerdale Borough Location within Cumbria
- 54.835258°N 3.411301°W
- Type: Milecastle
- Location: Cumbria, England

Milefortlet 14 was a Milefortlet of the Roman Cumbrian Coast defences. These milefortlets and intervening stone watchtowers extended from the western end of Hadrian's Wall, along the Cumbrian coast and were linked by a wooden palisade. They were contemporary with defensive structures on Hadrian's Wall. The site of Milefortlet 14 has never been identified and it may lie beneath the village of Beckfoot. A larger fort known as Bibra Roman Fort was located 500 metres south-west of Milefortlet 14.

== Description ==
Milefortlet 14 was situated at the north end of the village of Beckfoot in the civil parish of Holme St Cuthbert. The milefortlet has never been located, but its approximate position has been calculated from the positions of other Roman fortlets. It may be situated at the summit of a low ridge 40 metres east of the B5300 road, but the site is occupied in part by a bungalow and caravan site. Some Roman pottery has been found in the dunes in the area.

Milefortlet 14 was located about 500 metres north-east of Bibra Roman Fort which was occupied from the 2nd to the 4th century. It is uncertain how the new Bibra fort related to the rest of the system—whether it was contemporary with it or whether it replaced Milefortlet 14.

== Associated Towers ==
Each milefortlet had two associated towers, similar in construction to the turrets built along Hadrian's Wall. These towers were positioned approximately one-third and two-thirds of a Roman mile to the west of the Milefortlet, and would probably have been manned by part of the nearest Milefortlet's garrison. The towers associated with Milefortlet 14 are known as Tower 14A (grid reference NY09144929) and Tower 14B (grid reference NY08944885).

Neither tower has been accurately located and their positions been estimated from adjoining milefortlets and towers. The site of Tower 14A is on a slight ridge. The site of Tower 14B corresponds to the site of the Bibra fort.
