= Plasketlands =

Hamlet in Cumbria, England

Coordinates: 54.807°N 3.395°W

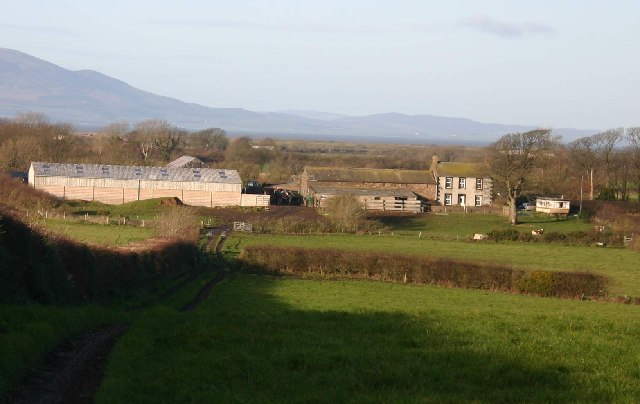
- Plasketlands Farm, c. 2005

- Location in Allerdale, Cumbria Location within Cumbria
- OS grid reference: NY103466
- Civil parish: Holme St Cuthbert
- Unitary authority: Cumberland
- Ceremonial county: Cumbria
- Region: North West
- Country: England
- Sovereign state: United Kingdom
- Post town: MARYPORT
- Postcode district: CA15
- Dialling code: 01900
- Police: Cumbria
- Fire: Cumbria
- Ambulance: North West
- UK Parliament: Penrith and Solway

Plasketlands is a hamlet in the civil parish of Holme St. Cuthbert in Cumbria, England. It is located approximately a quarter-of-a-mile south-west of Goodyhills, a quarter-of-a-mile to the south of the hamlet of Holme St. Cuthbert and one-and-a-half miles east of Mawbray. Carlisle, Cumbria's county town, is twenty-four miles away to the north-east. The settlement is divided into two distinct parts: High Plasketlands and Plasketlands. Jordan beck, a tributary of the Black Dub beck, flows through Plasketlands on its way to Allonby Bay.

== History and toponymy ==
The name Plasketlands comes from the Old English plashet, meaning "a fence of living wood". It was historically spelled several different ways, including Plassegaytt, Plaskitlands, Plascade-lands, and Plesketh Landes.

Evidence of settlement at Plasketlands goes back thousands of years. A palisade of posts at Plasketlands has been radiocarbon dated to somewhere between 4000 BC and 2500 BC.
