= Listed buildings in Westnewton, Cumbria =

Westnewton is a civil parish in the Cumberland district, Cumbria, England. It contains seven listed buildings that are recorded in the National Heritage List for England. All the listed buildings are designated at Grade II, the lowest of the three grades, which is applied to "buildings of national importance and special interest". The parish contains the village of Westnewton, and is otherwise rural. The listed buildings consist of houses and associated structures, farmhouses and farm buildings, and two milestones.

== Buildings ==
Name and location	Photograph	Date	Notes
Yew Tree Farmhouse; 54.78387°N 3.34813°W	—	1672	A roughcast farmhouse that has a Welsh slate roof with coped gables. There are two storeys and five bays. The doorway has a Tudor-style surround and a hood mould, and the windows are sashes in chamfered stone surrounds.
Milestone; 54.77716°N 3.38838°W	—	Late 18th or early 19th century	The milestone was provided for the Wigton to Workington turnpike. It consists of a round-topped stone inscribed with the distances in miles to Wigton and to Workington.
Milestone; 54.79015°N 3.33293°W	—	Late 18th or early 19th century	The milestone was provided for the Wigton to Workington turnpike. It consists of a round-topped stone inscribed with the distances in miles to Wigton and to Workington.
Westnewton Hall; 54.78288°N 3.35014°W	—	Early 19th century	The house is in red and yellow sandstone on a chamfered plinth, with quoins, an eaves cornice, and a hipped green slate roof. There are two storeys and five bays. The house has a round-headed doorway with a fanlight, a pilastered surround and a false keystone. The windows are sashes in stone surrounds.
Wall and gate piers, Westnewton Hall; 54.78262°N 3.34975°W	—	Early 19th century	The wall and gate piers are at the front of the garden They are in sandstone and consist of a quadrant wall, and a pair of square rusticated piers with shaped caps.
Mealrigg Hall; 54.79722°N 3.35678°W	—	1832	A sandstone farmhouse with quoins and a green slate roof. It has two storeys and four bays. The doorway has a fanlight and a pediment. The windows are sashes in stone surrounds, and at the rear is a Venetian stair window.
Westnewton Grange and stables/barn 54.78215°N 3.35131°W	—	Mid 19th century	The farmhouse was extended in the late 19th century. The buildings are stuccoed and have green slate roofs. The original part of the farmhouse and the extension have two storeys and each has three bays. The windows are sashes. In the original part is an Ionic porch and a doorway with a fanlight. The ground floor windows have console-bracketed hood moulds. The extension has a doorway to the right, and to its left is a two-light bay window, with a gabled dormer above. The barn and stables to the left have an L-shaped plan and contain a doorway, casement windows, ovals vents, and an archway to the left.
