= Listed buildings in Holme St Cuthbert =

Holme St Cuthbert is a civil parish in the Cumberland unitary authority area of Cumbria, England. It contains nine listed buildings that are recorded in the National Heritage List for England. All the listed buildings are designated at Grade II, the lowest of the three grades, which is applied to "buildings of national importance and special interest". The parish contains the villages and hamlets of Holme St Cuthbert, Edderside, Mawbray, Newtown, New Cowper, and Beckfoot, and the surrounding countryside. The listed buildings consist of houses, farmhouses, farm buildings, and a chapel.

== Buildings ==
Name and location	Photograph	Date	Notes
New Cowper Farmhouse and barn 54.79566°N 3.36676°W	—	Mid or late 17th century	The barn is the earlier part, with the farmhouse dating from the early 18th century. They are roughcast with green slate roofs. The house has two storeys and three bays, a doorway in a stone architrave, and sash windows. The barn to the left has two doorways, one with a Tudor arched head and a hood mould. There are loft doors and a through arch at the left end, and in the rear wall is a re-set coat of arms.
Farmhouse north of Midtown Farmhouse; 54.82315°N 3.40383°W	—	1686	A roughcast farmhouse on projecting plinth stones with a green slate roof. There are two storeys and three bays, a doorway with an architrave and a dated lintel, and sash windows.
West End Farmhouse and former stable 54.79639°N 3.40103°W	—	Early 18th century	The farmhouse and stable are rendered with a green slate roof. The house has quoins, and is in two storeys and three bays. The doorway and sash windows have bolection architraves, and above the doorway is a segmental pediment. The stable to the left has a plank door and a loft door with quatrefoil vents.
Manor House and Neville House; 54.79701°N 3.39954°W	—	1739	Originally one farmhouse, later divided into two dwellings. The older part is Neville House, and Manor House dates from 1785. The houses are roughcast with angle pilasters and eaves cornices, and have green slate roofs with coped gables. Both houses have two storeys and three bays, and contain sash windows. Neville House has a 20th-century porch, and Manor House has a doorway with an architrave and a shell hood.
Ostle House; 54.80834°N 3.43039°W	—	1764	A rendered house that has a green slate roof with coped gables. There are two storeys, two bays, sash windows, and a doorway with a chamfered surround and a dated lintel.
Orchard House; 54.80727°N 3.42484°W	—	1772	A roughcast farmhouse on a chamfered plinth with quoins, an eaves cornice, and a green slate roof. There are two storeys and three bays, sash windows, and a doorway with an architrave.
New House; 54.83746°N 3.40580°W	—	Late 18th or early 19th century	A stuccoed farmhouse with a green slate roof, in two storeys and four bays. Most of the windows are sashes, and there is a Venetian stair window.
Lowsay Farmhouse; 54.82294°N 3.38307°W	—	Early 19th century	The farmhouse is in roughcast sandstone with quoins and a Westmorland slate roof. It has two storeys, three bays, and a double-pile plan. The windows are sashes, and the doorway has a stone surround with a keystone. At the rear is a Venetian stair window, and a re-set datestone.
Methodist Chapel; 54.80554°N 3.42302°W	—	1843	The chapel is rendered with a green slate roofs. It has a single storey and has two bays. There is a central gabled porch, flanked by windows with pointed heads. Above the porch is an oval inscribed stone.
