= Listed buildings in Holme Abbey =

Holme Abbey is a civil parish in the Cumberland district in Cumbria, England. It contains 15 listed buildings that are recorded in the National Heritage List for England. Of these, one is listed at Grade I, the highest of the three grades, one is at Grade II*, the middle grade, and the others are at Grade II, the lowest grade. The parish contains the village of Abbeytown and smaller settlements, and is otherwise rural. The most important building in the parish was Holmcultram Abbey part of which has been converted into a parish church, and other parts have been used in other buildings. Most of the other listed buildings are houses and associated structures, farmhouses and farm buildings.

== Key ==
Grade	Criteria
I	Buildings of exceptional interest, sometimes considered to be internationally important
II*	Particularly important buildings of more than special interest
II	Buildings of national importance and special interest

== Buildings ==
Name and location	Photograph	Date	Notes	Grade
St Mary's Church; 54.84541°N 3.28289°W		1150	The church was formed from the nave of Holmcultram Abbey. Alterations were made in 1730, the vestry was added in 1884–85, the church was restored in 1913, and an ambulatory was added in 1973. The building is in Scottish sandstone, with roofs mainly of green slate and some Welsh slate. The church consists of a west porch, a combined nave and chancel, and a north vestry and organ chamber. On the west gable of the nave is a twin bellcote. The building is also a scheduled monument.	I
Mill Grove; 54.84431°N 3.28243°W	—	1472 (probable)	Originally the infirmary for Holmcultram Abbey, then used a vicarage, and after that as a farmhouse. It is built in large blocks of sandstone on a chamfered plinth, with a roof of Welsh slate that has coped gables. The house has two storeys and a front of eight bays. The left two bays project forward and contain two small windows with chamfered surrounds, and a two-storey bow window with mullioned windows. The other windows are sashes in architraves. In the fourth bay is a doorway with a chamfered surround, a Tudor arched head, an inscribed lintel, and a hood mould. The sixth bay contains another doorway with a fanlight.	II*
Kingside Hill; 54.85117°N 3.31613°W	—	17th century	A former farmhouse, now a house, with outbuildings that were extended in 1734 and at later dates. The buildings are in mud, sandstone and brick, and have roofs of stone and Welsh slate. The house has two storeys and three bays. Above the doorway is a dated lintel, and the windows are 20th-century casements. In line with the house is a shippon that contains doorways, one with a moulded canopy, a hayloft, and ventilation slits. Inside the building are four cruck trusses.	II
Mill and barns, Abbey Cowper; 54.84308°N 3.31250°W	—	17th century	A house and barn were incorporated into a steam corn mill in the 19th century, and the building was later used as a barn. The earlier buildings were in clay on sandstone foundations, and the later part is rendered with brick at the rear; it has a hipped green slate roof. The building has two storeys, the former mill has six bays, and with the earlier buildings it forms a U-shaped plan. It contains doorways, sash windows, and a large cart entrance. Inside the older part is a pair of cruck trusses.	II
Swinsty Farmhouse; 54.84074°N 3.28643°W	—	1667	The farmhouse was altered and extended in the 18th and 19th centuries, one extension being dated 1866. It is in rendered rubble, some of it from Holmcultram Abbey, and it has a green slate roof with coped gables. There are two storeys, the original part having three bays, and with flanking extensions. Above the doorway is a fanlight, and the windows are sashes. Also in the walls are a shaped and dated lintel (probably re-set), the capital of a column from the abbey, and a datestone.	II
Barn and byres, Mill Grove; 54.84445°N 3.28259°W	—	Late 17th or early 18th century	The building incorporates a medieval plinth and a wall. It is in sandstone from Holmcultram Abbey and has a Welsh slate roof with coped gables. The building is in a single storey, and contains a cart doorway and ventilation slits.	II
Red Flatt Farmhouse and barns 54.86438°N 3.29578°W	—	1707	The farmhouse and flanking barns are in brick with green slate roofs repaired with Welsh slate. The house has quoins, two storeys and five bays. The doorway has a bolection moulded surround, a panelled frieze, and a cornice on moulded consoles. The windows are sashes in architraves. The barn to the right has a casement window in a chamfered surround, and ventilation slits, and the barn to the left contains a Venetian window with a blocked oval opening above.	II
Bog Farmhouse and former barn 54.81611°N 3.34307°W	—	Early 18th century	The former barn has been incorporated into the farmhouse. The building is in cobbles, brick, and sandstone, and it has a green slate roof. The house has two storeys and two bays, with the former two-bay barn to the left. Most of the windows are sashes.	II
Abbey Cowper; 54.84314°N 3.31205°W		1735	A farmhouse that was much altered later. It is stuccoed on a chamfered plinth, and has quoins and a green slate roof. It has two storeys, three bays, a Tuscan porch, and sash windows.	II
Sundial, Abbey Cowper; 54.84327°N 3.31170°W	—	1765	The sundial was moved to its present position during the 20th century. It is in red sandstone, and consists of a square pedestal and column. The sundial has a ball dial with Roman numerals, and inscriptions in English and Latin.	II
East O' Brow Top; 54.83635°N 3.33543°W	—	1767	Originally a farmhouse, later a private house, it is roughcast with large projecting plinth stones, and a green slate roof with coped gables. There are two storeys and three bays, and above the doorway is a dated and inscribed lintel. One mullioned window remains, the others having been replaced by sashes.	II
Brownrigg; 54.86254°N 3.29642°W	—	Late 18th or early 19th century	A brick house on a chamfered plinth with quoins and a Welsh slate roof. It has two storeys and three bays, and contains sash windows. The doorway has a Tuscan doorcase with an open pediment and a fanlight.	II
Holme Cultram House; 54.84753°N 3.29364°W	—	1817	Originally a vicarage, then used as a private house, it is in brick on a chamfered plinth, with quoins and a hipped green slate roof. There are two storeys and three bays. On the front is a doorway with a Tuscan doorcase, an open pediment, and a fanlight, and the windows are sashes in architraves.	II
Abbey Shop and Abbeytown Library; 54.84522°N 3.28331°W	—	Late 19th century	Built as parish rooms, and incorporating part of the guest house of Holmcultram Abbey, it was later used for other purposes. The building is in sandstone, and has a green slate roof with coped gables. It has two storeys and four bays, with a single-bay extension to the left. The windows in the main range are mullioned, and in the extension is a shop window.	II
Churchyard wall, St Mary's Church; 54.84514°N 3.28321°W	—	20th century	The red sandstone wall is built on a medieval plinth. It is a low wall on the site of the south aisle wall of Holmcultram Abbey, and it includes the foundation of the entrance to the cloister.	II
