= Solfest =

Annual music festival in Cumbria, England

Coordinates: 54°48′46″N 3°22′22″W

The Solway Festival
- Genre: Rock music, alternative rock, northern soul, electronic dance music, indie rock, world music, punk rock, reggae, folk music
- Dates: August Bank Holiday weekend
- Locations: Tarns, Cumbria
- Years active: 2004–2026
- Founders: The Solfest Committee
- Website: http://www.solfest.co.uk

Solfest 2007 Aerial Photograph

Solfest is a music and arts festival on the Solway Coast in the North West of England. It is held annually at North Lakes Country Park on the August Bank Holiday weekend. It has grown from a 1,800 capacity event in 2004 to a 10,000 capacity festival. Originally, the 2019 edition of Solfest was going be the last, but due to new directors taking control of the festival and the turnout of the 2019 event being much higher than anticipated, Solfest will return in 2020.

== Organisation ==
The Solfest organisation was initially formed in September 2003 when a team of West Cumbrian festival-goers got together and made initial plans to create a festival of their own a little nearer to home. They were quickly joined by other interested parties and Solfest was run by a structured committee of sixteen permanent members until 2010 when the management structure changed. Solfest is now run by a smaller management team.

While Solway Festival Ltd is a registered company, the organisation operates as a social enterprise whereby all surplus income is reinvested into the organisation. Solfest is constituted in such a way that it does not allow any members of the Solfest Committee to make any financial gain from the festival.

== History ==
The Solfest festival is operated by Solfest Ltd, a registered company. It is run as a constituted social enterprise by unpaid volunteers, and does not have any corporate sponsorship. The first festival took place over the weekend of 3–5 September 2004 on a 26-acre (110,000 m^{2}) site at Tarnside Farm (approximately halfway between the towns of Aspatria and Silloth). About 1,800 people attended the festival in its first year. It currently hosts an annual crowd of up to 10,000 people.

The festival provides a variety of music. It has three large stages (Main stage, Drystone Stage & Bar Stage) as well as a dance tent. The festival also has dedicated welfare areas and children's play areas. Other activities are provided by visiting artists, which range from crafts and woodworking to entertainers and musicians.

Solfest was cancelled in 2014, but returned in 2015. In 2018, organisers initially announced that the 2019 festival would be the last edition of Solfest. This was attributed to falling attendance numbers, especially in 2018, and growing debts. However, organisers cited increased attendance at the 2019 festival in announcing that Solfest is to return in 2020.

Solfest was cancelled in 2020 due to the outbreak of the Coronavirus disease 2019.

In October 2020 it was announced that Arts Council England awarded Solfest £100,000 as part of the Culture Recovery Fund setup in the wake of the Coronavirus pandemic.

== Location ==
The original site for Solfest was Tarnside Farm, Silloth, but the festival relocated to North Lakes Country Park, Silloth from 2019 onwards.

== Performers ==
Artists who have appeared at the Solfest Festival include: Badly Drawn Boy, The Fratellis, The Coral, Buzzcocks, Supergrass, Oysterband, The Levellers, The Wonderstuff, The Charlatans (UK band), James (band), Róisín Murphy, Bluehorses, Blockheads, The Bad Shepherds, Pikey Beatz, Misty's Big Adventure, Kate Rusby, The Orb, System 7, Easy Star All Stars, The Undertones, The Proclaimers, The Beat, From The Jam, Seth Lakeman, Show of Hands, Ozric Tentacles, 3 Daft Monkeys, Bex Marshall, Penny Broadhurst, Katus, Silverwheel, Eat Static, The Damned, Evil Nine, Alabama 3, New Young Pony Club, The Magic Numbers, Alejandro Toledo, Utah Saints, Howlin' Ric & The Rocketeers and escapology expert David Straitjacket.

== Awards ==
Solfest won the "Best Family Festival Award" at the 2007 National Festival Awards.
