= Mawbray =

Coastal village in Cumbria, England

Coordinates: 54.80776°N 3.426369°W

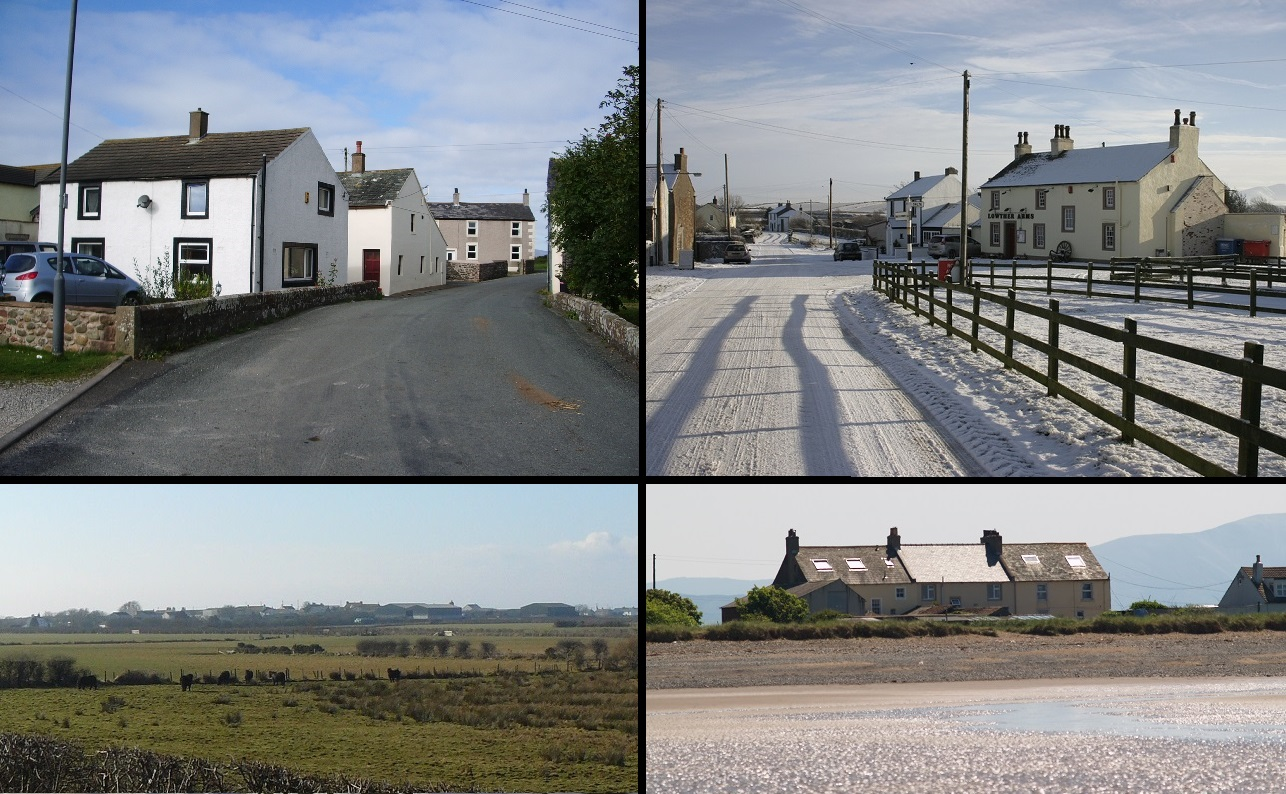
- Clockwise from top left: Looking west over the bridge, taken near Culterham Hall; Looking east toward the pub; Mawbray Yard seen from the beach; The village seen from the east, taken on the road leading to Holme St. Cuthbert.

- Location in Allerdale Location within Cumbria
- OS grid reference: NY083468
- Civil parish: Holme St. Cuthbert
- Unitary authority: Cumberland
- Ceremonial county: Cumbria
- Region: North West
- Country: England
- Sovereign state: United Kingdom
- Post town: Maryport
- Postcode district: CA15
- Dialling code: 01900
- Police: Cumbria
- Fire: Cumbria
- Ambulance: North West
- UK Parliament: Penrith and Solway

Mawbray is a village in the civil parish of Holme St Cuthbert in Cumbria, England. Historically part of Cumberland. It is located on the Solway Plain, 5.2 miles (8.4 km) south west of Silloth, 7.9 miles (12.7 km) north of Maryport, and 25 miles (40 km) west of Carlisle. The B5300, known locally as the "coast road" runs to the west of the village.

Mawbray serves as the hub of a community of several smaller hamlets, including Beckfoot, Goodyhills, Hailforth, Holme St Cuthbert, Jericho, Newtown, Salta, and Tarns.

== Toponymy ==
The name "Mawbray" is believed to be derived from Latin, meaning "a maiden's castle or fort". This would be consistent with Roman mile-forts known to exist nearby on the coast, especially in the Maryport area. A Roman fortlet, known as Milefortlet 16, has been located at the west end of the village. Alternatively, the early forms of the first element seem to be from Old English mæge, later replaced by Maw from the variant māge. The second element is burh, which means a "fortified place, town, or manor house", and the name means "the maidens' stronghold", or, "maidens' castle". The early form of the name was Mayburgh, and additional variants include Mayburg, Mawbrey, Malbrough, and Malbrew. Some variants, such as Olde Malbraw and Old Mawbery add an "Old" prefix, to distinguish the village from "New Mawbray", two miles to the north, today known as Newtown.

== History ==
=== Prehistory ===
This part of the west Cumbrian coastline has a very long history. The area that today forms Mawbray would have been uninhabitable by humans until around 11,000 BC, as it was covered in ice sheets from the last ice age. Archaeological evidence from Mawbray and the surrounding area shows clear evidence of human activity and habitation as early as 4000 BC, as a ditched enclosure with large post-holes in an 'annexe' was excavated at nearby Plasketlands, as has been identified as being from the early Neolithic period. The archaeologist in charge of the expedition, R. H. Bewley, called the find their "best evidence for permanent settlement" on the Solway Plain. On the Moss at nearby Salta, a Bronze Age rapier (a kind of sword) was discovered in the 1980s, and is believed to have been crafted as early as 1100 BC, providing further evidence of pre-Roman occupation.

=== Roman times ===
During the Roman period, this part of the Cumbrian coastline was fortified, as coastal defences were constructed beyond the western end of Hadrian's Wall to protect against incursions across the Solway Firth. Milefortlets 14, 15, 16, and 17 are all located nearby, with milefortlet 16 being the closest. However, centuries of coastal erosion have taken their toll, and today, only the rear eastern rampart of milefortlet 16 survives.

By the 1820s, the nearby "Roman camp" – which is assumed to refer to either milefortlet 16 or one of its associated towers – had fallen into a state of disrepair. The vallum had been defaced, and the site of the camp was used for growing corn. However, it was noted that "some of the old inhabitants remember part of the wall standing." By inference, the last remaining part of the Roman wall at Mawbray had collapsed or been removed during the latter part of the 18th century – over 1,600 years after it was built. An inscribed stone was also discovered in the Roman camp near Mawbray, and historians in the 19th century believed that the stone showed that it was likely that Roman soldiers from Hispania built the wall or edifice which contained it. However, given the term "Pannon" used in the inscription, recent analysis suggests that it is more likely that soldiers from Pannonia – modern-day Hungary – were responsible for the Mawbray stone.

==== Roman inscription ====
The following is the text of the inscription discovered on a stone from the Roman camp near to Mawbray:
L. TA. PRAEF. COH. II. PANNON FECIT

=== Middle ages ===
The threat of raids and attacks from Scots across the sea did not end with the departure of the Romans, however, and as late as the 1550s, Scottish raiders were still attacking Mawbray and the surrounding communities. A system called the seawake – a night watch along the coast – was instituted, and Mawbray participated along with other coastal communities in the area. Defence against Scottish raids was also important to the Lord and Steward of Holm Cultram when planning the settlement of New Mawbray, today known as Newtown, in the same period.

The site of the present village had been established by the time Norman surveyors reached the Solway Plain in the 1150s. From the Anglo-Saxon period right up to the twentieth century, the majority of Mawbray's inhabitants are believed to have been fishermen and farmers. Farming and fishing still continue in the village in the present day, with more of the former than the latter, but the inhabitants today are more diverse, including "a journalist, an artist and a television presenter".

=== Nineteenth and twentieth centuries ===
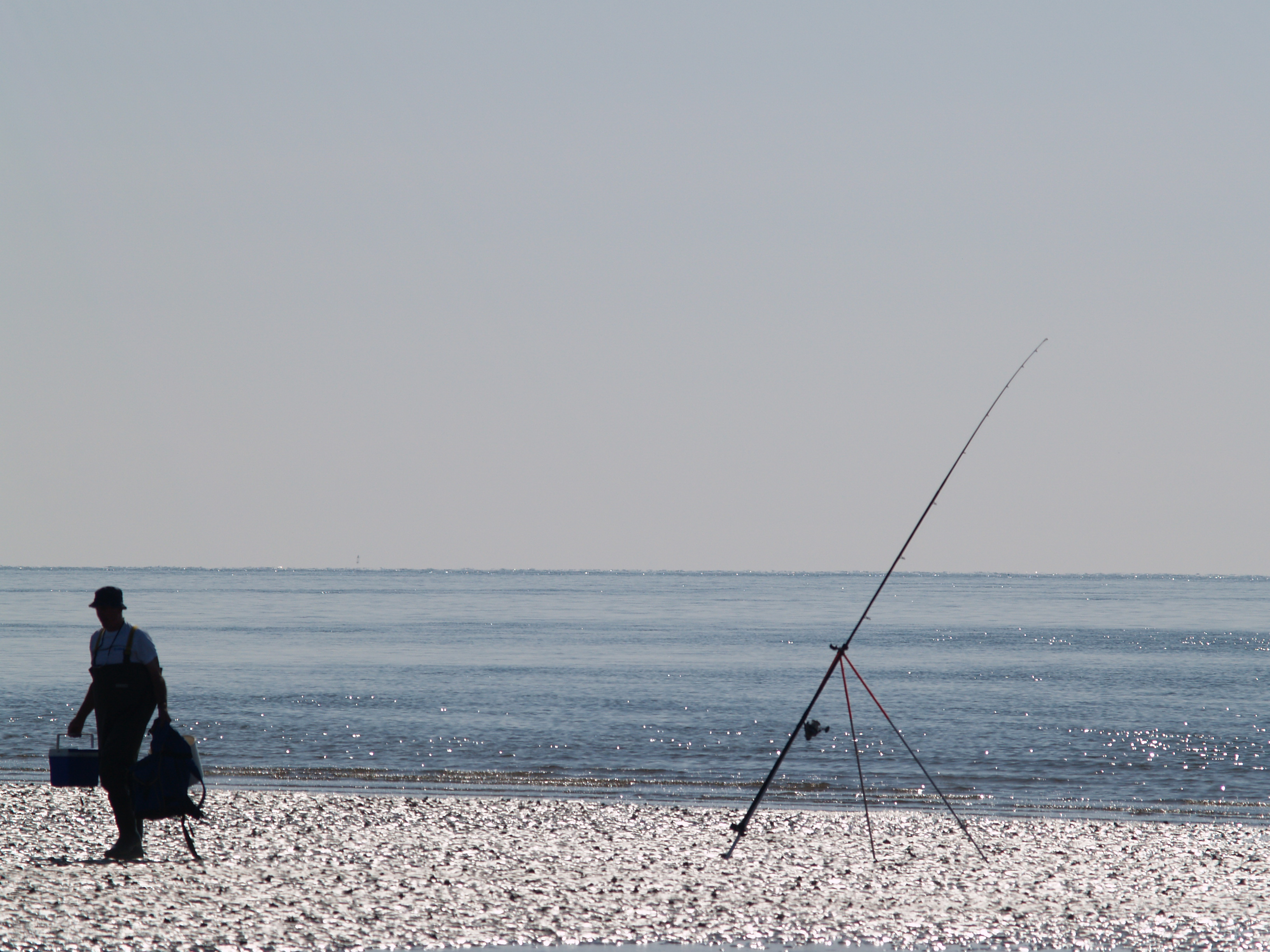
Mawbray fisherman

Mawbray used to have many diverse shops and tradesmen operating in the eighteenth and nineteenth centuries, but in the present day, these have been lost. Trades such as "bacon and ham curer, shoemaker, blacksmith, joiner and dressmaker" have long since disappeared from the village. However, in 2018 a new cheese company was founded in the village, bringing back a cottage industry that would have existed in the past. The village post office and shop closed in the 1980s. The local pub, The Lowther Arms, has been in existence since 1847. Directly opposite the pub is a small children's playground. The current play area was funded by the community and built by local woodworkers around the year 2000.

== The Village Today ==
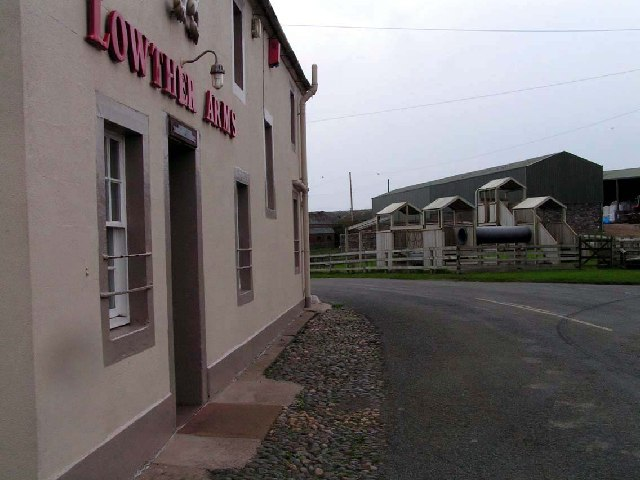
The Lowther Arms, which closed in 2018, is located roughly in the centre of the village. There is a play area for children located on the green opposite, and one of Mawbray's several farms in the background.

Culterham Hall, known locally as the village hall, opened in 1951 and is the centre of activity in Mawbray today. An amateur dramatics group called the Mawbray Entertainers performed their own pantomime every year from 1988 to 2015 during the half-term break in February in Culterham Hall, and the money raised was donated to a range of local and national charities. The village hall also accommodates many other musical events, especially by performers on the Rural Touring Scheme throughout the year. In addition to these special events, members of the community run a wide range of clubs and activities at the hall, from sports like Tai Chi and bowls to dog training classes and a weekly children's club. In addition, the hall plays host to craft sales several times a year, including in the run-up to Christmas, where local craftspeople sell a range of items.

Mawbray is served by a local bus service, running every couple of hours between Silloth and Maryport. This service has replaced an earlier bus service which ran between Silloth and Workington. Smaller roads besides the B5300 run northeast towards Abbeytown, and southwest towards Hailforth, Salta, and Dubmill. With the village hall, Mawbray serves as the centre of the community for these outlying settlements. However, Mawbray itself is not home to the local primary school, which is instead located at Holme St Cuthbert, as is the local church. The Lowther Arms pub closed in May 2018 and reopened in June 2021 after being purchased via a community partnership.

One of the famous red telephone boxes is located in the village, and it has been converted to hold a defibrillator. Mawbray also retains a post box, and in the village hall there is a preserved example of a Victorian-era post box (though it is no longer in use).

== Governance ==
Mawbray is part of the Penrith and Solway constituency of the UK Parliament.

For Local Government purposes it is in the Cumberland unitary authority area.

Regarding its Parish Council, Mawbray is part of Holme St Cuthbert Parish Council.

== Climate ==
Mawbray, like the rest of Cumbria, has an oceanic climate (Köppen climate classification Cfb), with warm summers and cool winters which generally avoid extremes of temperature. Compared with the mountainous Lake District and the southern part of the county, Mawbray, as is the case with the rest of the Solway Plain, tends to have milder winters with snowfall being relatively uncommon thanks to its coastal location. Rainfall is heavier in the autumn and winter months, but still occurs during spring and summer.

Extremes of weather are almost unheard of; even during the 2009 Cumbria floods, Mawbray escaped unscathed. The biggest weather-related dangers come from the sea and predominantly effect Mawbray Yard rather than the main village. Thunderstorms accompanied by high winds can whip up large waves which risk flooding outlying houses nearer to the beach, and as this part of the beach lacks any serious coastal defences, a storm surge or even an unusually high tide has the potential to cause flooding.

Climate data for Mawbray
Month	Jan	Feb	Mar	Apr	May	Jun	Jul	Aug	Sep	Oct	Nov	Dec	Year
Mean daily maximum °C (°F)	7 (45)	7 (45)	9 (48)	12 (54)	15 (59)	17 (63)	19 (66)	19 (66)	17 (63)	13 (55)	9 (48)	6 (43)	12.5 (54.5)
Mean daily minimum °C (°F)	2 (36)	2 (36)	3 (37)	4 (39)	7 (45)	9 (48)	12 (54)	12 (54)	9 (48)	7 (45)	4 (39)	2 (36)	6 (43)
Average precipitation mm (inches)	93.6 (3.69)	105.1 (4.14)	72.0 (2.83)	63.5 (2.50)	60.1 (2.37)	70.3 (2.77)	58.4 (2.30)	76.2 (3.00)	73.4 (2.89)	109.4 (4.31)	93.2 (3.67)	102.5 (4.04)	977.7 (38.49)
Source: World Weather Online

== Location ==
The following grid shows Mawbray's location in relation to other nearby places:

== See also ==
- Listed buildings in Holme St Cuthbert
