= Holme St Cuthbert =

Civil parish in Cumbria, England

Coordinates: 54.8106°N 3.3935°W

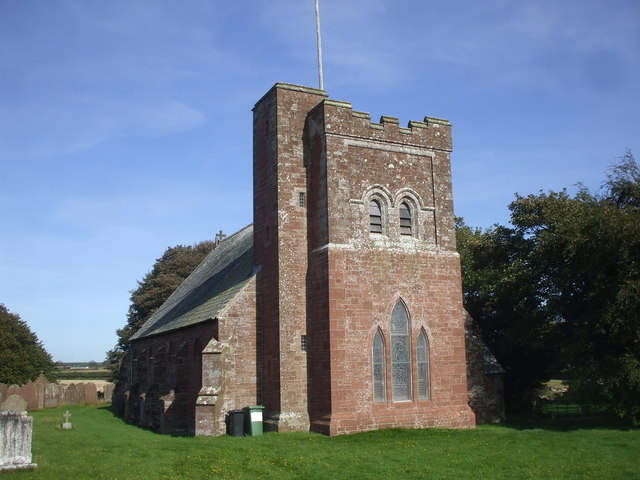
- The church at Holme St Cuthbert, constructed from local sandstone.

- Location within Cumbria
- Population: 413 (Parish, 2021)
- OS grid reference: NY104470
- Civil parish: Holme St Cuthbert
- Unitary authority: Cumberland
- Ceremonial county: Cumbria
- Region: North West
- Country: England
- Sovereign state: United Kingdom
- Post town: Maryport
- Postcode district: CA15
- Dialling code: 01900
- Police: Cumbria
- Fire: Cumbria
- Ambulance: North West
- UK Parliament: Penrith and Solway

Holme St Cuthbert is a small village and civil parish in the Cumberland district of Cumbria, England. The village is located 23 miles (37 km) south-west of Carlisle. The parish covers a largely rural area containing a number of small hamlets; the largest village is Mawbray. The parish had a population of 413 at the 2021 census.

== Toponymy ==
The name is derived from Old Norse, where the Norse word "holmr" meant "islet". Hence, "Holme St Cuthbert" means "St Cuthbert's islet".

Saint Cuthbert was an early Anglo-Saxon saint, known for his association with the Lindisfarne Gospels. It is unlikely he visited the parish, but he definitely visited Carlisle. This area was historically known as the St Cuthbert's quarter of the parish of Holme Cultram. Holme St Cuthbert took its name from a chapel of ease dedicated to St Cuthbert, which was known to have existed by at least 1538. That chapel did not endure and its exact location is unknown, although it was said to be near the sea. When a new chapel was built to serve the area in 1845, it was also dedicated to St Cuthbert.

== Geography ==
=== Parish ===
The parish of Holme St Cuthbert is a rural area, and includes the village of Mawbray and the hamlets of Aikshaw, Beckfoot, Cowgate, Dubmill, Edderside, Goodyhills, Hailforth, Jericho, New Cowper, Newtown, Pelutho, Plasketlands, Salta, and Tarns.

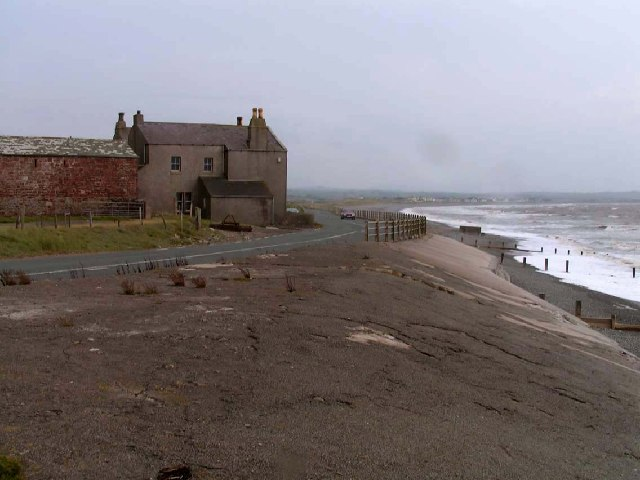
At Dubmill Point on the parish's western boundary, the B5300 coast road runs atop the concrete sea wall.

It is bordered to the north by the civil parish of Holme Low, to the east by Holme Abbey, to the south by Allonby along the Black Dub beck, and to the south-east by Westnewton. On its western side, the parish meets the Solway Firth, and has approximately four miles of coastline. An area known as Skinburness Marsh, east of Silloth, does not border the rest of the parish, but is common to the parishes of Holme St Cuthbert, Holme Abbey, and Holme Low.

Mawbray, being the largest village in the parish, is the hub of the community. Mawbray's village hall is frequently used for a wide range of activities, and the Lowther Arms in Mawbray has been a popular spot for food and drink with residents of the parish since it re-opened in 2014 after two periods of closure in the 2000s and early 2010s.

Extremes of weather are uncommon in the parish, but one serious danger is from the sea. With over four miles of coastline in the parish, and a major road (the B5300) running very close to the shore, storms and even very high tides are a threat. In 2014 the sea wall at Dubmill Point, near Salta, was breached in several places, and a £130,000 repair scheme was commissioned by Cumbria County Council.

Between November and December 2018 a public consultation called the Cumbria Coastal Strategy was held to evaluate and manage the risks related to coastal flooding and erosion along the Cumbrian coastline. Holme St Cuthbert civil parish has approximately four miles of coastline, and this was assessed as part of the consultation. The well-defended area of coastline around Dubmill was mostly determined to have between five and twenty years worth of life left, but concerns were raised about failed rock-based sea defences to the south and north of Dubmill point. The consultation also set out to determine the impact coastal erosion would have on the village of Mawbray, with the potential to change tactics if there was to be significant impact. The sand dunes at Mawbray Bank were estimated to erode anywhere from 4 to 8 metres in the next 20 years, rising to as much as 40 m of erosion in the next century if left unchecked. At Beckfoot, it was noted that much of the erosion that has taken place and is predicted to take place in the future is as a result of individual storms rather than continuous, slow erosion. Over the next century, the coast at Beckfoot is estimated to endure no more than 6.6 m of erosion.

=== Holme St Cuthbert village ===
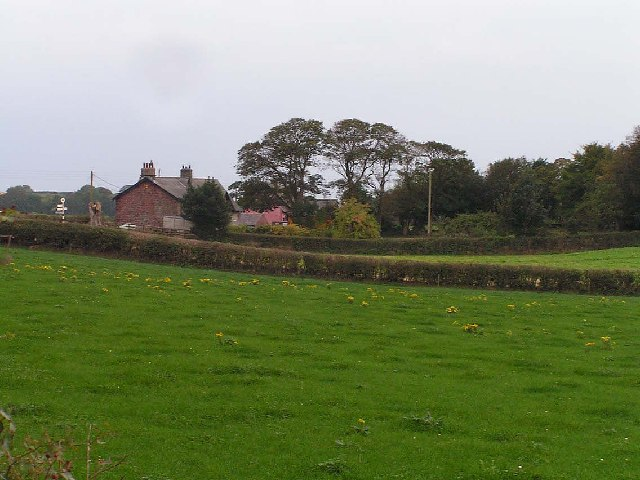
The hamlet of Holme St Cuthbert as seen from the road from Newtown and Tarns.

Holme St Cuthbert itself is particularly small. While it is home to the parish church, church hall, and the local primary school, there are very few houses.

St Cuthbert's Church was constructed of locally quarried sandstone, and remains in use today. The primary school, though it caters to less than 50 pupils, has been rated as "outstanding" by school inspectors Ofsted. The church and school were built in 1845.

The village lies along the road which runs from the B5300 coast road at Mawbray to the B5301 at Tarns. There is also a junction in the village, where a side road leads past the church hall to Goodyhills, less than a quarter of a mile away, and Jericho. There are no regular public transport links, though a school bus stops in the village bound for the Nelson Thomlinson school in Wigton. The nearest stop on a regular bus service is at Mawbray, where services run every two hours toward Maryport in the south and Silloth-on-Solway in the north. The nearest railway station is at Aspatria, five-and-a-half miles to the south-east, where trains on the Cumbrian Coast Line run approximately once an hour north toward Carlisle and south toward Whitehaven, and occasionally Barrow-in-Furness and Lancaster.

== History ==
Holme St Cuthbert was historically a township, which covered 6,301 acres (2,550 ha). The land was formerly owned by Holm Cultram Abbey. In 1814, common land was enclosed under the Inclosure Acts. The quarter was centred around Mawbray - then known as Old Malbray.

During the Second World War, 43 evacuees from Newcastle-Upon-Tyne and the surrounding area were billeted to farms in the parish.

Holme St Cuthbert parish council objected to plans by the government to use west Cumbria as a disposal and storage site for nuclear waste. The process, called Managing Radioactive Waste Safely (MRWS) drew strong objections from the community at a meeting on the subject, and the council accordingly adopted a motion calling for west Cumbria to withdraw from the MRWS process. The main reasons for objecting were concerns about geology, damage to local tourism, and safety. Furthermore, the council stated that they had "no confidence" in their right to withdraw from the process as it progressed.

== Governance ==
There are two tiers of local government covering Holme St Cuthbert, at civil parish and unitary authority level: Holme St Cuthbert Parish Council and Cumberland Council. The parish council generally meets at Holme St Cuthbert Hall.

=== Administrative history ===
Holme St Cuthbert was historically a township in the ancient parish of Holme Cultram, which had its parish church at Abbeytown. From the 17th century onwards, parishes were gradually given various civil functions under the poor laws, in addition to their original ecclesiastical functions. In some cases, including Holme Cultram, the civil functions were exercised by each township separately rather than the parish as a whole. In 1866, the legal definition of 'parish' was changed to be the areas used for administering the poor laws, and so Holme St Cuthbert also became a civil parish.

In ecclesiastical terms, St Cuthbert's Church was a chapel of ease to St Mary's Church, Abbeytown when it was built in 1845. The township of Holme St Cuthbert was also made an ecclesiastical parish in 1849, with St Cuthbert's being elevated to become a parish church.

== Demography ==
At the 2021 census the parish had a population of 413. There were 421 residents at the 2001 census, and the population was 465 at the 2011 census.

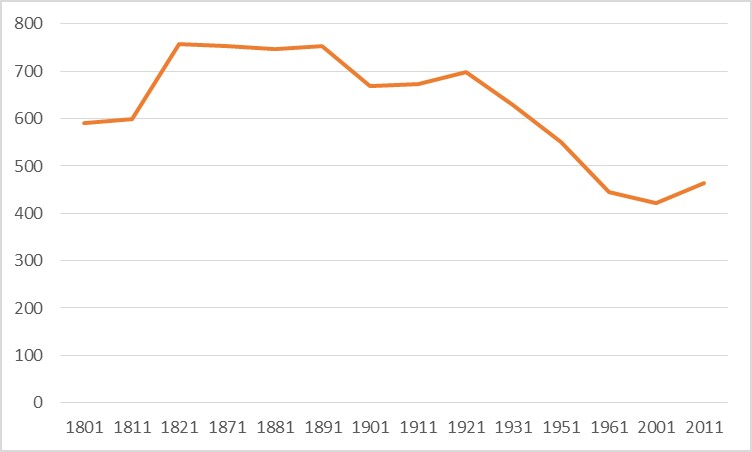
Changes to the population of Holme St Cuthbert between 1801 and 2011.

The parish's population remains well below where it was in the 19th and early 20th centuries. In 1871-2, the population was given as 821, but steadily declined in the years to at least 1961.

== See also ==
- Listed buildings in Holme St Cuthbert
