= St Mary's Church, Abbeytown =

Coordinates: 54.8454°N 3.2829°W

St Mary's Church
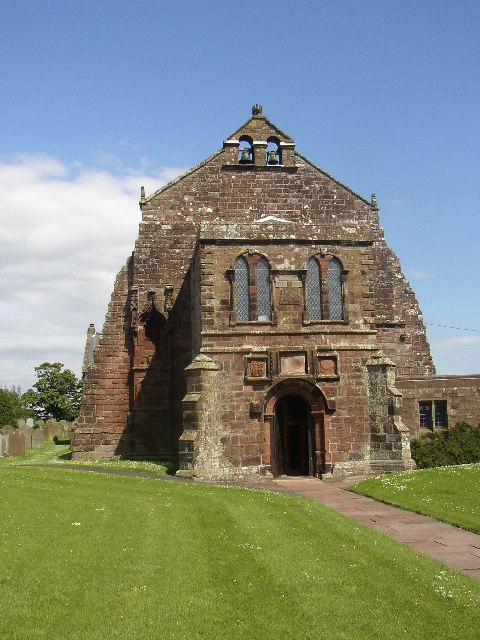
- West front of St Mary's Church

- Location in Allerdale, Cumbria Location in Cumbria, England
- OS grid reference: NY 177 508
- Location: Abbeytown, Cumbria
- Country: England
- Denomination: Anglican
- Website: St Mary, Abbeytown

History
- Status: Parish Church
- Founded: 1150
- Founders: King David of Scotland; Henry of Scotland

Architecture
- Functional status: Active
- Heritage designation: Grade I
- Designated: 11 April 1967
- Architectural type: Church
- Style: Norman, Gothic

Specifications
- Materials: Sandstone, slate roofs

Administration
- Province: York
- Diocese: Carlisle
- Archdeaconry: West Cumberland
- Deanery: Solway
- Parish: Holme Cultram

Clergy
- Rector: Revd Canon Bryan Rothwell
- Vicar: Revd David Tembey

St Mary's Church is in the village of Abbeytown, Cumbria, England. It is an active Anglican parish church in the deanery of Solway, the archdeaconry of West Cumberland, and the diocese of Carlisle. Its benefice is united with those of six local churches to form the Solway Plain Team Ministry. The church is recorded in the National Heritage List for England as a designated Grade I listed building.

== History ==
The present church has been formed from part of the church of Holmcultram Abbey, a Cistercian monastery that had been founded in 1150 by King David of Scotland and his son Henry. In 1507 the Abbot, Robert Chambers, added a west porch. At the time of the Dissolution of the Monasteries in 1538, the local parishioners were worshipping in the nave of the church, and they were allowed to continue to use it. The tower fell on New Year's Day 1600, destroying the choir and the north transept. By this time the endowment was owned by the University of Oxford, who carried out repairs, hampered in 1604 by a fire. During the 18th century, more repairs and alterations were carried out. Between 1727 and 1739, the nave was shortened from nine to six bays, the aisle arcades were filled in, the clerestory was removed, and galleries and a flat ceiling were added. The galleries were removed in 1883. In 1884–85 a vestry was added. In 1913 the church was restored; this included removal of the flat ceiling. An ambulatory was added to the south side of the church in 1973. On 9 June 2006 a fire was started in the church by a thief. This destroyed the wooden roof, and damaged the stonework and the stained glass. A new oak roof was installed in 2008.

== Architecture ==
=== Exterior ===
St Mary's is constructed in large blocks of red sandstone from Scotland. The roof is mainly of green slate, with some Welsh grey slate. Its plan consists of a continuous six-bay nave and chancel, a west porch, an ambulatory, and a north vestry and organ chamber. On the west gable is a double bellcote. The west porch is in two storeys with a round-arched doorway, inscribed with the name of Robert Chambers, his coat of arms, and the date 1507. The upper floor has been converted into a vestry, and contains two two-light lancet windows. The side walls of the nave contain round-headed casement windows. The east window, which was relocated in 1730, is Perpendicular in style, dating from about 1630. Inside the porch and ambulatory are graveslabs to members of the Chambers family. The inner doorway of the porch is Norman, with four orders of columns. Another Norman doorway leads from the church into the ambulatory (it originally entered the south aisle).

=== Interior ===
Inside the church the blocked arcades have pointed arches carried on clustered piers. Above the west door is a singers' gallery. In the church are two ancient chests, and fragments of carved stones. The stained glass in the east window is by William Wailes. There is more glass by Wailes elsewhere, and windows by Powells, and by E. and C. O'Neill. Parts of the tomb of Richard Chambers, who died in 1518, are in the ambulatory. The two-manual pipe organ, made by Nicholson and Lord, was destroyed in the 2006 fire.

== External features ==
The churchyard wall to the south of the church has been listed at Grade II. It consists of sandstone blocks on a medieval plinth. This is the site of the south aisle wall of the former abbey church, and the plinth incorporates the excavated foundations of the entrance to the abbey's cloister. The abbey site is a scheduled monument.

== See also ==
- Grade I listed churches in Cumbria
- Grade I listed buildings in Cumbria
- Listed buildings in Holme Abbey
- List of English abbeys, priories and friaries serving as parish churches
