= Newtown, Holme St Cuthbert =

Hamlet in Cumbria, England

Coordinates: 54.823°N 3.403°W

Newtown
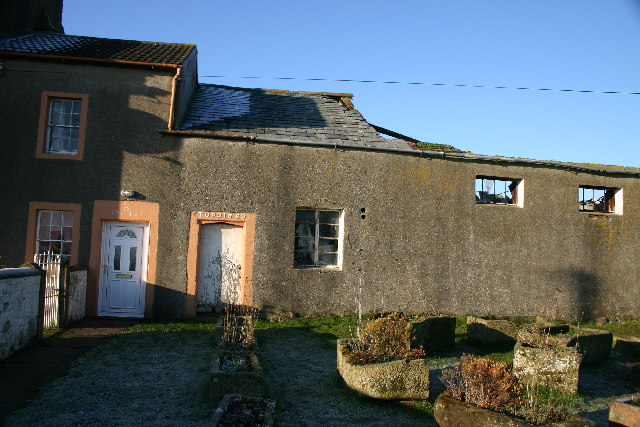
- Farmhouse ruins, Newtown

- Location in Allerdale, Cumbria Location within Cumbria
- OS grid reference: NY098484
- Civil parish: Holme St. Cuthbert
- Unitary authority: Cumberland
- Ceremonial county: Cumbria
- Region: North West
- Country: England
- Sovereign state: United Kingdom
- Post town: WIGTON
- Postcode district: CA7
- Dialling code: 016973
- Police: Cumbria
- Fire: Cumbria
- Ambulance: North West
- UK Parliament: Penrith and Solway

Newtown is a hamlet in the civil parish of Holme St Cuthbert in Cumbria, England. It is located approximately two miles north-east of the village of Mawbray, a little over half-a-mile as the crow flies to the south-east of Beckfoot, and twenty-five miles west of the city of Carlisle. The B5300 coast road runs approximately three-quarters of a mile to the west of the hamlet, which goes to Maryport, nine-and-a-quarter miles to the south-west, and Silloth-on-Solway, approximately four miles to the north.

== History and toponymy ==
Newtown was first recorded in a 1538 survey of the Manor of Holm Cultram, and in the past has been known as New Mawbray. The name "Mawbray" comes from the Old English mæge-burh, meaning "the maidens' stronghold", or "maidens' castle", and the "New" prefix was added to distinguish the settlement from its namesake. Additional variant spellings include New Mawbrough, Newton, Newtowne, and Newtowene.

The hamlet was created after the sea shifted sands near Beckfoot in the 16th century. This resulted in many residents having to leave their homes (or their homes being destroyed by the encroaching sea). Defence against Scottish incursions across the Solway was a concern of the Lord and Steward of Holm Cultram when planning the new settlement. Residents of Newtown in this era would have been expected to take part in the "seawake", a night watch to guard the Solway coast against Scottish raids.

In 1828, a farmer named John Ostle was born at Newtown. His diaries recorded farming life on the Solway Plain in the 19th century, and have given local historians a great deal of information about Newtown and surrounding communities during that period.

== The hamlet today ==
The hamlet itself has no public transportation links or amenities. The nearest primary school is at Holme St. Cuthbert, one-and-a-quarter miles to the south-east, as is the parish church. There is a pub, the Lowther, in Mawbray, but perhaps the closest attraction to Newtown is a farm park and tea room called the Gincase. The nearest railway station is Aspatria, and the nearest bus stops are at Beckfoot and Mawbray, on the B5300 coast road.

Newtown is situated very near to the Solway Coast Area of Outstanding Natural Beauty, which encompasses much of the shoreline to the west of the hamlet. Also along this section of the shoreline, Mawbray and Wolsty banks are designated as a Site of Special Scientific Interest. The hamlet is within the civil parish of Holme St. Cuthbert, and administered as part of the Cumberland unitary authority. The parliamentary constituency is Penrith and Solway.

== See also ==
- Listed buildings in Holme St Cuthbert
