= Solway Plain =

Coordinates: 54.8447°N 3.2877°W

Solway Basin
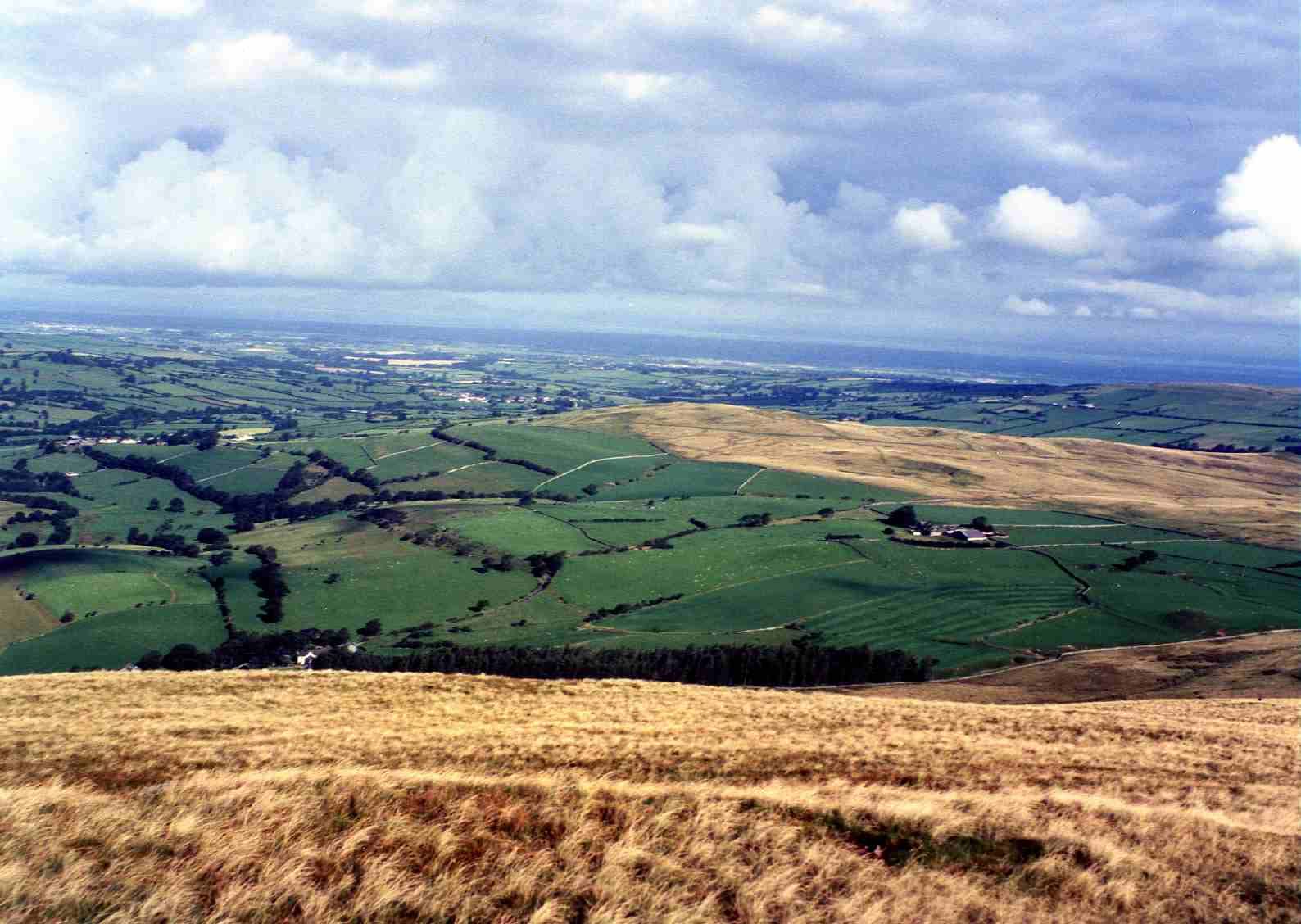
- A view of the Solway Plain from Longlands Fell
- Ceremonial county: Cumbria
- Country: England
- Sovereign state: United Kingdom

The Solway Plain or Solway Basin is a coastal plain located mostly in northwest Cumbria in England, extending just over the Scottish border to the low-lying area around Gretna and Annan. It lies generally north and west of Carlisle along the Solway Firth, and is drained by the rivers Esk and Lyne. It is associated with the westernmost part of Hadrian's Wall. In medieval times, clay houses known as dabbins were commonly built on the Solway Plain. The Solway coast has been designated an “Area of Outstanding Natural Beauty”.

The plain is known for its archaeological heritage. Archaeological finds that are mentioned in Hodgson and Brennand include urned cremation cemeteries at Ewanrigg, evidence suggesting an ancient domestic settlement at Plasketlands, and evidence suggesting pre-Roman occupation at Ewanrigg, Wolsty Hall and Boustead Hill (among other sites). Salta Moss, where a Bronze Age rapier was discovered, boasts flora that is unusual for a mire on the Solway Plain, and has been designated a “Site of Special Scientific Interest” since 1982. As the presence of Hadrian's Wall attests, the Solway Plain is also known for its history as a disputed borderland, control of which was often fought over — from the Roman occupation of Britain to the Border Reivers and Anglo-Scottish conflicts in the Middle Ages.

== Geography ==
The vast and flat Solway Plain lies inland from the Solway Coast, which has been designated as both an “Area of Outstanding Natural Beauty” and a “Special Area of Conservation”, due to its salt marshes, sand dunes, and wetlands, which have given rise to marked and distinctive biodiversity. Agriculturally, like much of Northern England, the Solway Plain is dominated by pastoral agriculture, as evidenced by its popular beef and dairy markets. It is also known for its mostly protected bogland and its stores of peat. Its major rivers are the Ellen in the west, and the Sark, Esk, and Eden in the east. In the hillier regions toward the southeastern part of the plain, further from the coast, woodlands are common and river valleys are pronounced. The plain is also home to the cathedral city of Carlisle, which was historically a strategically important city.

== Proposed nuclear waste facility ==
In June 2012, it became clear that the Solway Plain between Silloth, Abbeytown and Westnewton has been identified as a potential site for a Geological Disposal Facility for the UK's high-level nuclear waste. Two other sites have also been identified - Eskdale and the Ennerdale. The Solway Plain wasn't named by the Managing Radioactive Waste Safely (MRWS) Partnership, rather they referred to the 'Low permeability sedimentary rocks associated with the Mercia Mudstone Group (MMG)'. This was in (publicly available) document 285 of the West Cumbria MRWS in a report written by Dr Dearlove, the consultant geologist recruited by MRWS.

== See also ==
- Stanegate
