= Goodyhills =

Hamlet in Cumbria, England

Coordinates: 54.808°N 3.389°W

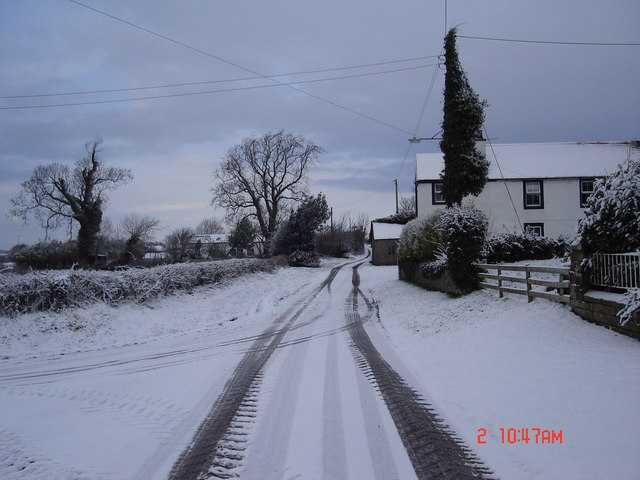
- Goodyhills, looking toward Holme St. Cuthbert

- Location in Allerdale, Cumbria Location within Cumbria
- OS grid reference: NY107467
- Civil parish: Holme St Cuthbert
- Unitary authority: Cumberland
- Ceremonial county: Cumbria
- Region: North West
- Country: England
- Sovereign state: United Kingdom
- Post town: Maryport
- Postcode district: CA15
- Dialling code: 01900
- Police: Cumbria
- Fire: Cumbria
- Ambulance: North West
- UK Parliament: Penrith and Solway

Goodyhills is a hamlet in the civil parish of Holme St Cuthbert, in northern Cumbria, England. It is located 1.5 miles east of the village of Mawbray, and 23 miles west of the city of Carlisle.

A quarter of a mile to the north-west is the parish seat of Holme St Cuthbert, where the local primary school and parish church are located, and half a mile to the south-east is the small hamlet of Jericho. At nearby Newtown, there is a farm park and tea room called the Gincase. Goodyhills has no nearby public transport links; the closest railway station is at Aspatria, and the closest stop on a regular bus service is on the B5300 coast road at Mawbray.

Noted English academic William Wilson was born in Goodyhills in 1875, and attended the nearby Holme St. Cuthbert primary school. He attained his PhD at Leipzig University in Germany in 1902, and went on to become a lecturer at King's College, London. He became a Fellow of the Royal Society in 1923, and ended his career at Bedford College, London in 1944.

== Toponymy ==
The name "Goodyhills" comes from Old English, and means "godlike (or sacred) hills". It has been spelled in several different ways in the past, including Guddyhills, Goddy-hills, Gowdyhowse, and Goodlike-hills.
