= Jericho, Cumbria =

Settlement in Cumbria, England

Coordinates: 54.804°N 3.380°W

Jericho
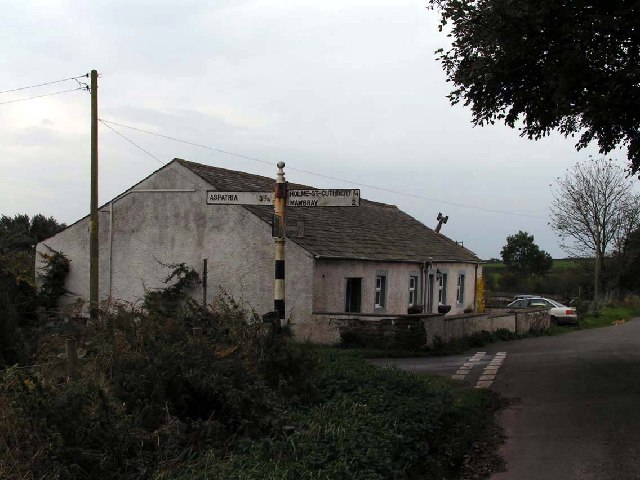
- The farmhouse at Jericho, Cumbria

- Location in Allerdale, Cumbria Location within Cumbria
- OS grid reference: NY113463
- Civil parish: Holme St Cuthbert
- Unitary authority: Cumberland
- Ceremonial county: Cumbria
- Region: North West
- Country: England
- Sovereign state: United Kingdom
- Post town: Maryport
- Postcode district: CA15
- Dialling code: 01900
- Police: Cumbria
- Fire: Cumbria
- Ambulance: North West
- UK Parliament: Penrith and Solway

Jericho is a settlement in the civil parish of Holme St. Cuthbert in Cumbria, England. It is located 2 miles east of the village of Mawbray, and 21.5 miles south-west of the city of Carlisle. It was presumably named for the Biblical city of Jericho, today located in the Palestinian territories.

The settlement appears in birth, marriage, and death registrations from as early as the mid-19th century, and so certainly existed by that time. It is also mentioned as the residence of the Salony family, who had a child (Mary) baptised in St Bees Priory Church in December 1773. Jericho consists of only a single farmhouse, and perhaps due to its particularly small size there is not a great deal of historical information about the settlement. It is not even named on contemporary mapping projects such as Google Maps.

Nearby is the Overby sand quarry, where Thomas Armstrong Ltd. extracts sand from a large deposit left behind after the last ice age. Work has been ongoing at the quarry, and other surrounding satellite quarries, for the past fifty years.

Jericho is located at a staggered crossroads, where single-lane roads lead north-east in the direction of Tarns, east toward Aikshaw and the Overby sand quarry, south-west to Edderside and the coast, and north-west to Holme St. Cuthbert via Goodyhills. The settlement has no public transportation links; the closest regular bus stop is on the B5300 coast road, 2.5 miles to the south-west.
