= Westnewton, Cumbria =

Coordinates: 54.784°N 3.345°W

Westnewton
- Village and parish
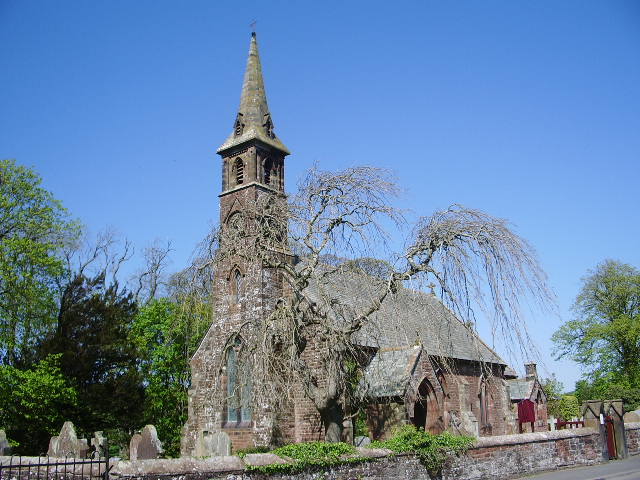
- The Parish Church of St. Matthew, Westnewton

- Location in the former Allerdale district Location within Cumbria
- Population: 265 (2011)
- OS grid reference: NY135440
- Civil parish: Westnewton
- Unitary authority: Cumberland
- Ceremonial county: Cumbria
- Region: North West
- Country: England
- Sovereign state: United Kingdom
- Post town: WIGTON
- Postcode district: CA7
- Dialling code: 016973
- Police: Cumbria
- Fire: Cumbria
- Ambulance: North West
- UK Parliament: Penrith and Solway

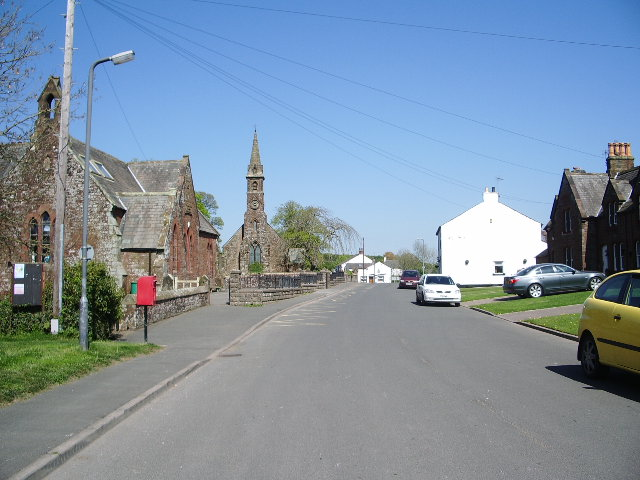

Westnewton is a small village and civil parish in Cumberland, Cumbria, England. The 2011 census had a population of 265. The village of Westnewton is situated to the north-west of the Lake District, on the relatively flat plain halfway between the Lake District hills and the Solway Firth. It is a small village located two miles north of Aspatria, on the B5301 Aspatria and Silloth road. The small hamlet of New Cowper is located one-and-a-half miles to the north-west. The landscape generally in this area is one of gently undulating fields, relatively devoid of features other than the thorn field-hedges, with shallow valleys carrying small streams, such as the Black Dub beck. Westnewton has a school called St Matthew's Church of England School, a church called St Matthew's Church, and a cemetery. There used to be a public house called the Swan Inn but this has closed.

== Toponymy ==
Westnewton derives its name from the de Neuton family, who were lords of the manor in the late 12th and 13th centuries, having received it through Odard, Sheriff of Wigton in the mid 12th century. The manor passed briefly by marriage to the Martindale family and then by the late 15th century to the powerful Musgrave and Hylton families of Hayton Castle near Allonby. Their ownership ceased in the early 19th century when the manor finally passed by marriage to the Joliffe family, who are recorded as being the owners until the early 20th century.

== History ==
Westnewton (until the 20th century spelled 'West Newton') is located in an area of West Cumbria which is sparsely populated and for which little evidence of pre- historic activity survives: crop marks in the area around the village may suggest early human activity but the nearest firm evidence is a Bronze Age barrow near Aspatria. Activity increased during the Roman occupation, with the defences against Scottish invasion along the Solway coast, but little evidence survives inland. Anglo-Danish and Norman settlement is more evident, again in Aspatria, but not outside established settlements.

There is therefore little evidence that Westnewton existed before the Mediaeval period, although it may stand on an earlier communication route. At this point the Aspatria to Silloth road crosses Westnewton Beck and also intersects with the road from Allonby to Wigton, all of them no doubt seeking a convenient fording point. The flat land of the valley bottom in this strategic but sheltered location, with a good water supply and fertile fields surrounding it, made it ideal for an agricultural settlement. Yearn Gill also joins the valley at this point, offering a further good source of water in Sandwith Beck.

The site of Westnewton Castle, at the western end of the village and close to the stream, may mark the baronial home of the de Neuton family and the start of the settlement which bears their name. However, the surviving ruins – now just limited to grassy mounds and faint ditches – are now thought to be those of a mediaeval manor house, fortified or ornamented by a moat and gatehouse. The natural meander in the stream and the flatness of the land would readily lend the site to being moated.

Farmhouses were built in the valley, upstream of the manor house, presumably by tenants of the manor: the earliest and most notable survival is Yew Tree Farm, dated 1672, which was a house of some status. The village pinfold stood on the opposite side of the stream, near Burn View. The land to either side of the stream became more developed with ad hoc farmsteads, and under the Enclosure Acts the fields rising up to either side were divided into narrow strips which still survive to the present day, and which are particularly noticeable on the southern side of the valley

High status farmhouses were built at the western end, closest to the manor house (Westnewton Hall of the early 19th century, followed by Westnewton Grange in the mid 19th century) with buildings of lesser status to the east. At the eastern end the Aspatria to Silloth Road was flanked on one side by the Swan Inn and on the other by the Queen’s Head inn at the ford (now Raeburn House). One or two houses of quality were built at this end (Bridge End Farm and Croft View).

The status of the village increased in 1848 when it was provided with a school for 84 children, but this was replaced by a grander building in 1858. The benefactor was John Todd, a Manchester businessman of some wealth who was a native of the village. He also built St Matthew's Church in 1856, together with a Vicarage at the western end of the village (1858) and a row of four imposing houses opposite the school (St Matthew’s Cottages) presumably as almshouses or for other village worthies.

Historical records starting in the late 1800s show the overwhelming occupation of the residents to be agriculture-based, being predominantly farmsteads and their related businesses (smithying, stone-walling, quarrying, milling etc.), and this has probably always been the case. During the late 19th and early 20th centuries coal mining along the Solway coast provided a further source of employment.

Prior to the introduction of motor transport, and particularly widespread car ownership, Westnewton would have been relatively self-supporting and a hive of economic activity, centred on agriculture but including a range of trades exchanged between the residents such as shoe-making, tailoring, merchandising, food production, cooking, and laundering. The church and the inns would be the hubs of community activity and social interchange.

Westnewton was made a separate ecclesiastical parish in the late 1800s along with Langrigg and Mealrigg, with a total population of 443. It was made a civil parish in 1896. The population of the village itself had risen to around 400 by the start of the Second World War and has been boosted since the war by 'The Guards' housing estate at west end of the village. The Post House opposite the school is shown as being a Post Office (and village shop) by 1900. The village hall was built shortly after World War One (originally as the village reading room) next to Yew Tree House, and a new burial ground was opened next to the vicarage.

The village now still retains many working farmsteads, interspersed with some modern houses and bungalows, but its character remains firmly agricultural. In 2014, a wind farm was built at Warwick Hall farm.

== Governance ==
Westnewton is part of the parliamentary constituency of Penrith and Solway, and has been represented by Markus Campbell-Savours of the Labour Party since the 2024 general election. Prior to 2024, the village was in the constituency of Workington. In the December 2019 general election, the Conservative candidate for Workington, Mark Jenkinson, was elected the MP, overturning a 9.4 per cent Labour majority from the 2017 election to eject shadow environment secretary Sue Hayman by a margin of 4,136 votes. Until the December 2019 general election The Labour Party has won the seat in the constituency in every general election since 1979.The Conservative Party has only been elected once in Workington since World War II, at the 1976 by-election.

Before Brexit, it was in the North West England European Parliamentary Constituency.

For local government purposes, it is in the Cumberland unitary authority.

== See also ==
- Listed buildings in Westnewton, Cumbria
