= Holmcultram Abbey =

Cistercian monastery in Cumbria, England

Coordinates: 54.8454°N 3.2829°W

Holme Cultram Abbey
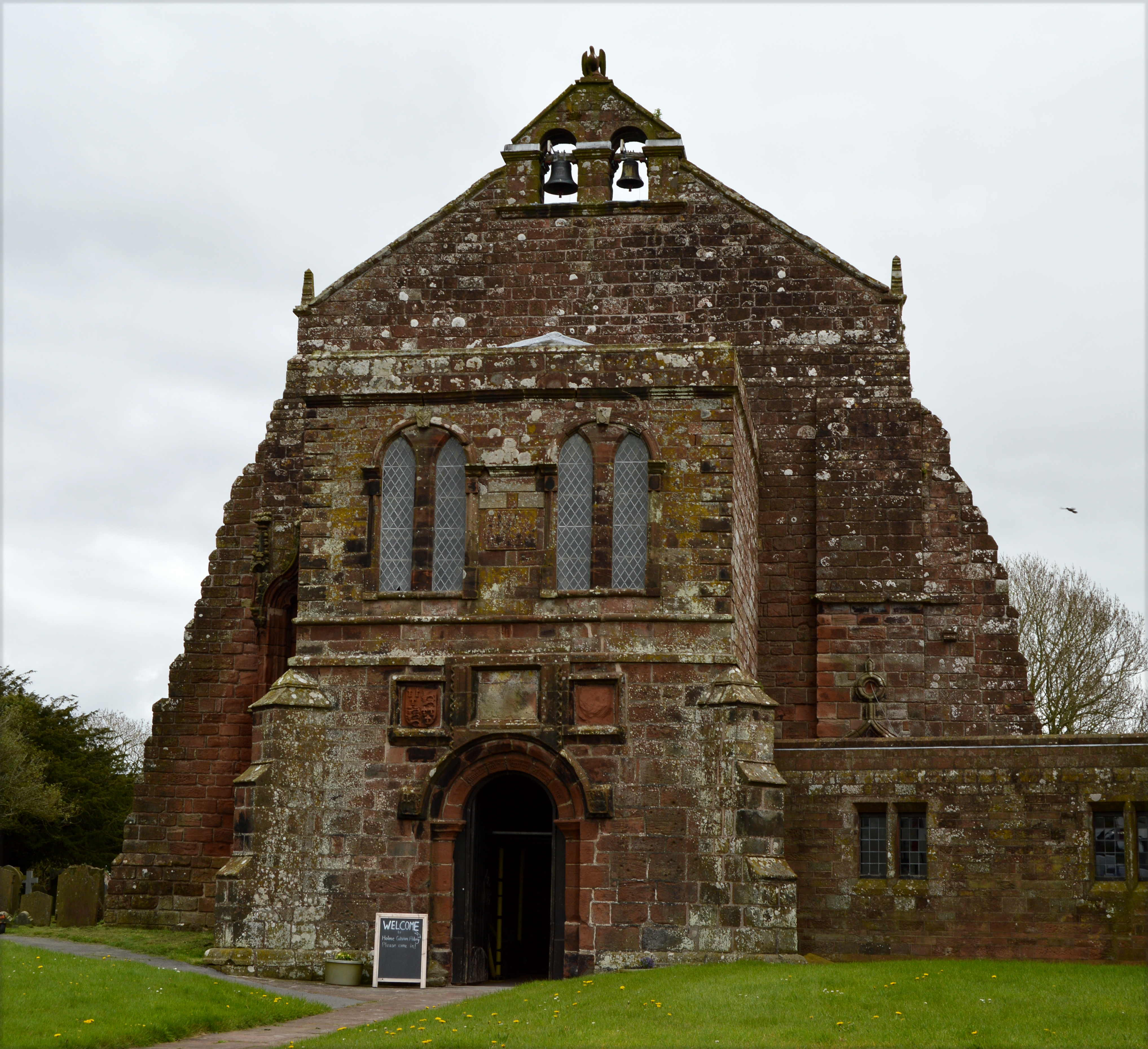
- Holmcultram Abbey 2017
- Interactive map of Holme Cultram Abbey

Monastery information
- Full name: Holmcultram Abbey
- Order: Cistercian
- Established: 1150
- Disestablished: 1538
- Diocese: Carlisle

Site
- Location: Abbeytown, Cumbria, England
- Visible remains: Nave; now a parish church
- Public access: Yes

Holmcultram Abbey (alternatively Holm Cultram Abbey or Holme Cultram Abbey) was a Cistercian monastery in what is now the village of Abbeytown in Cumbria, England.

Founded in 1150, the abbey was suppressed in 1538 during the Dissolution of the Monasteries. The former monastic church remains in use as a parish church (St Mary's Church, Abbeytown) and a place of worship.

== Foundation and Scots connections ==
The abbey was founded in 1150 by Cistercian monks from Melrose Abbey on land given by Alan of Allerdale. In territory formerly held by Scotland, the land was granted by Prince Henry and the building was made of stone from north of the Solway Firth. The area was later regained by Henry II of England who confirmed the grant of land in 1157. The abbey rented land in Galloway and held it for 200 years, disposing of it when it became no longer possible for Englishmen to hold land in Scotland.

== History ==
The abbey steadily became prosperous, acquiring lands in north Cumberland and undertaking reclamation work along the Solway. In 1301 it was granted a market at Skinburness, together with permission to build a church. Following violent storms which devastated Skinburness, both permissions were transferred to Newton Arlosh, where the abbey built a heavily fortified chapel of ease. Experience had shown that the abbey's Scots origins did not protect it from attacks by Scots raiders, from whom it suffered repeatedly from 1216 onwards, with a particularly severe attack in 1319, by Robert the Bruce, despite his father being buried there.

The community established a daughter house at Grey Abbey in County Down in Northern Ireland in 1193.

== Dissolution ==
This former Cumberland monastic community was dissolved in 1538, when the parish petitioned for, and obtained, the use of the church; the abbot became the first rector.

== Buildings ==
The buildings are constructed of red sandstone from the other side of the Solway. Archaeological excavations from 2006 onwards have shown that the monastic buildings extended to the south of the church, and followed the usual Cistercian pattern. The church was along the north side of the cloister, with other buildings on the other three sides, the refectory being opposite the church and the chapter house to the west. The former abbey church underwent a series of structural accidents (such as the collapse of the tower in 1600) and alterations as a result of which it gradually shrank to comprise the first six bays of the nave, without aisles. In addition the roof was lowered to the height of a single storey and there were two energetic restorations in 1883 and 1913. This nevertheless left a large enough building to continue to serve to the present day as the parish church of Abbeytown.

== Fire and restoration ==
The church was severely damaged by arson on 9 June 2006, when original records of the monastery, including the cartulary, were destroyed. It took over nine years to complete repair work to the abbey, but it was eventually fully restored and reopened to the public in September 2015. From the time of the arson attack until the reopening, parishioners worshipped in one of the side rooms which had been left undamaged. Also in September 2015, a further archaeological dig was being conducted in the grounds.

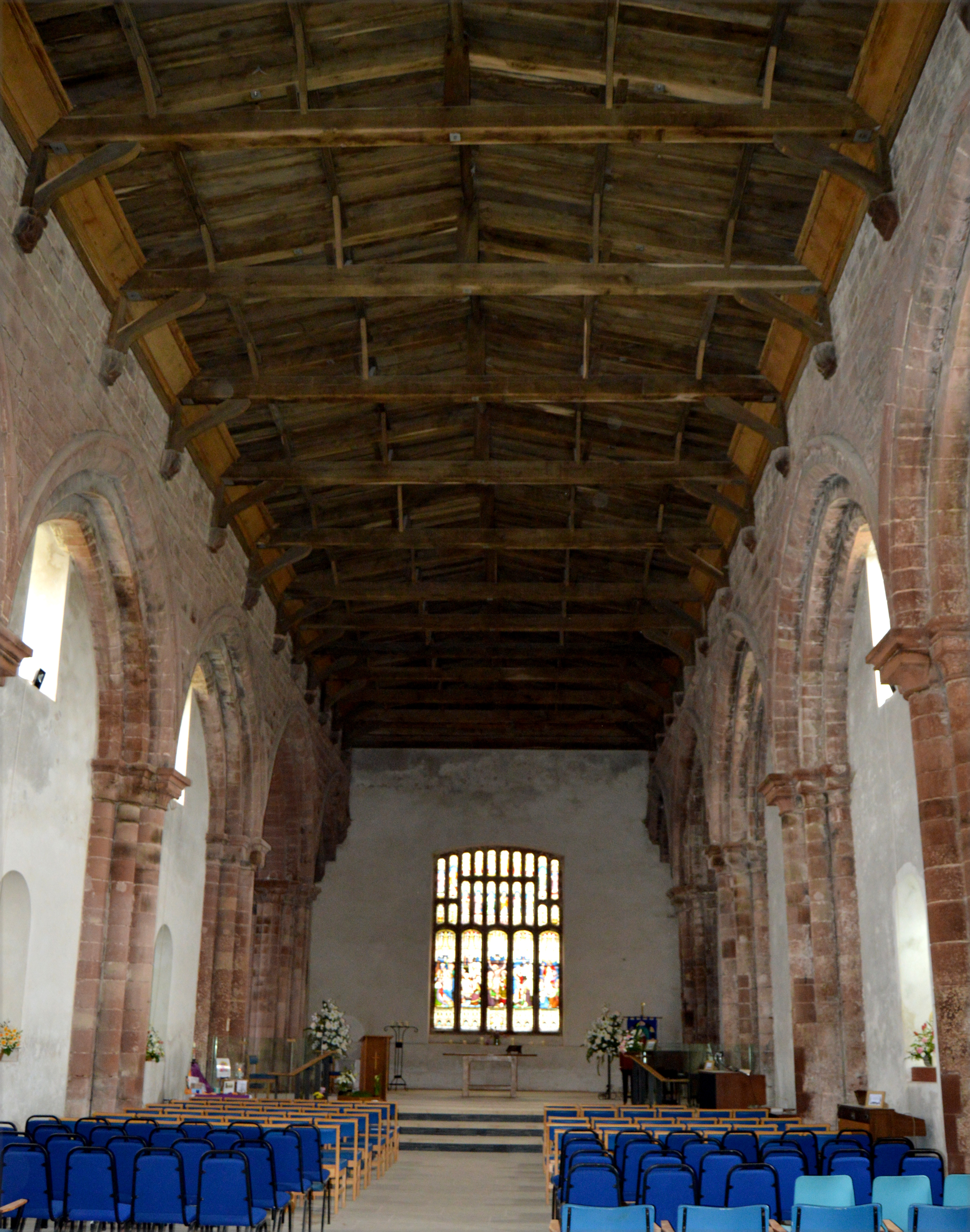
Church after restoration looking east

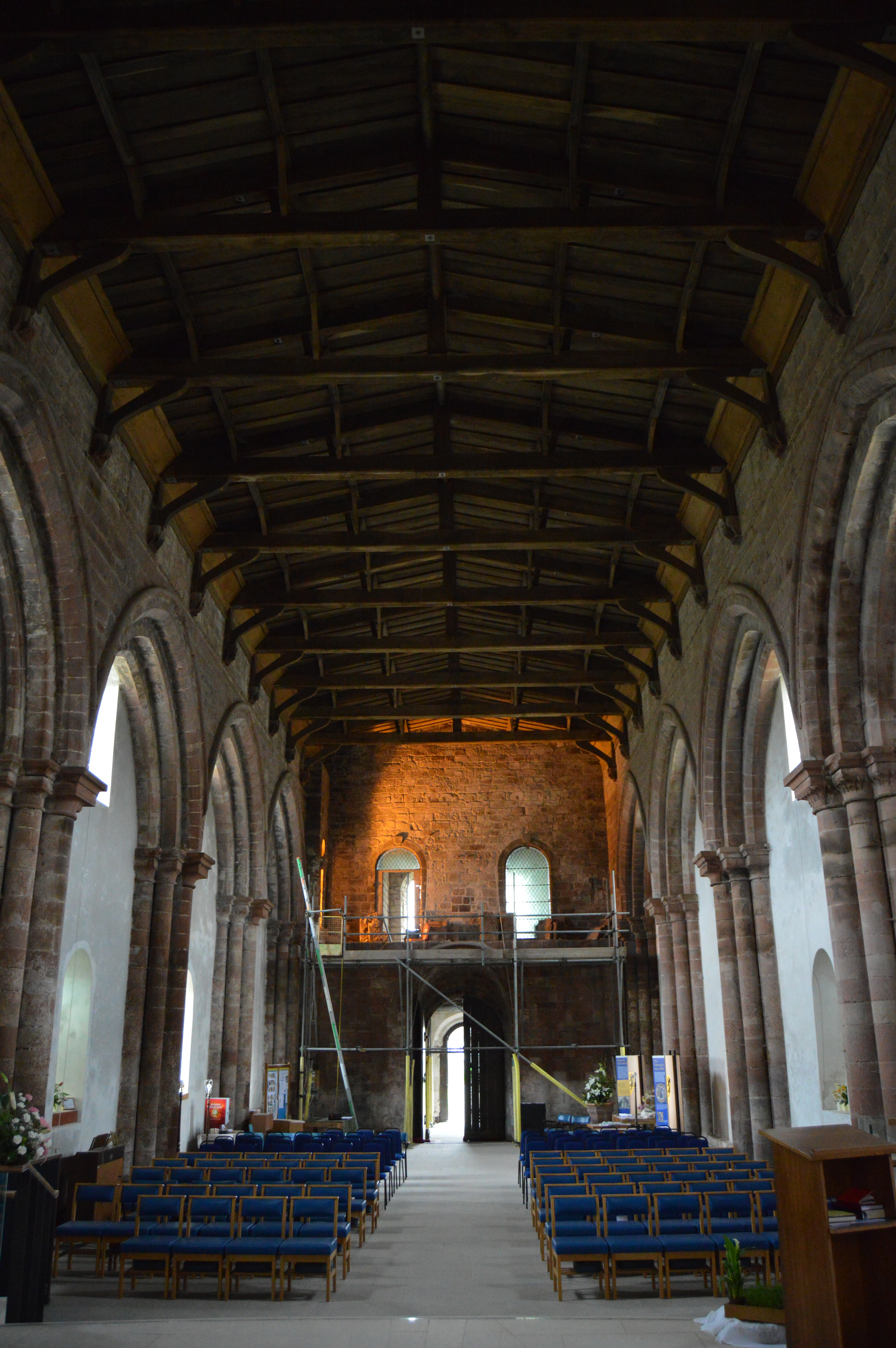
Church looking west with restoration work ongoing

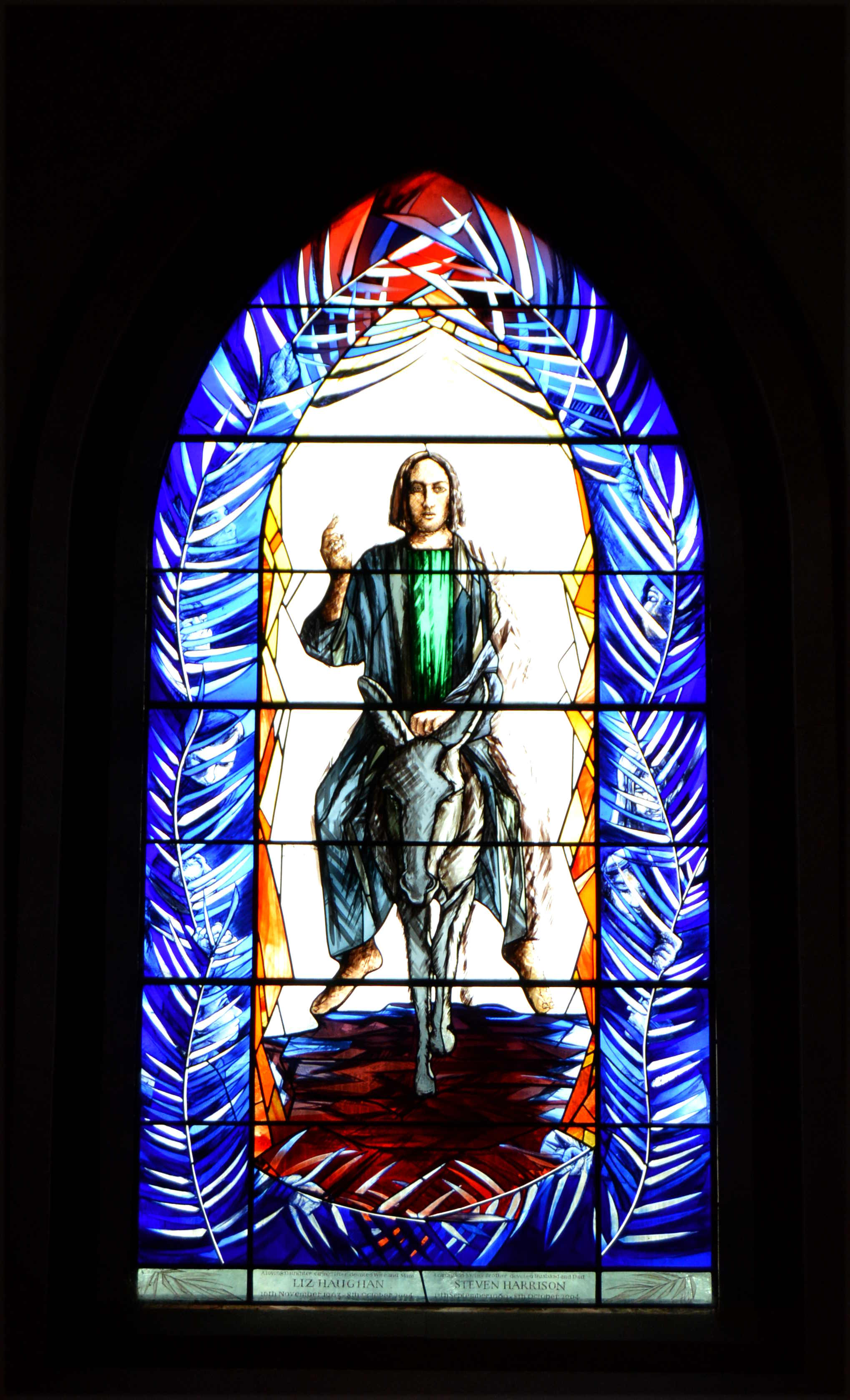
New window in restored north transept

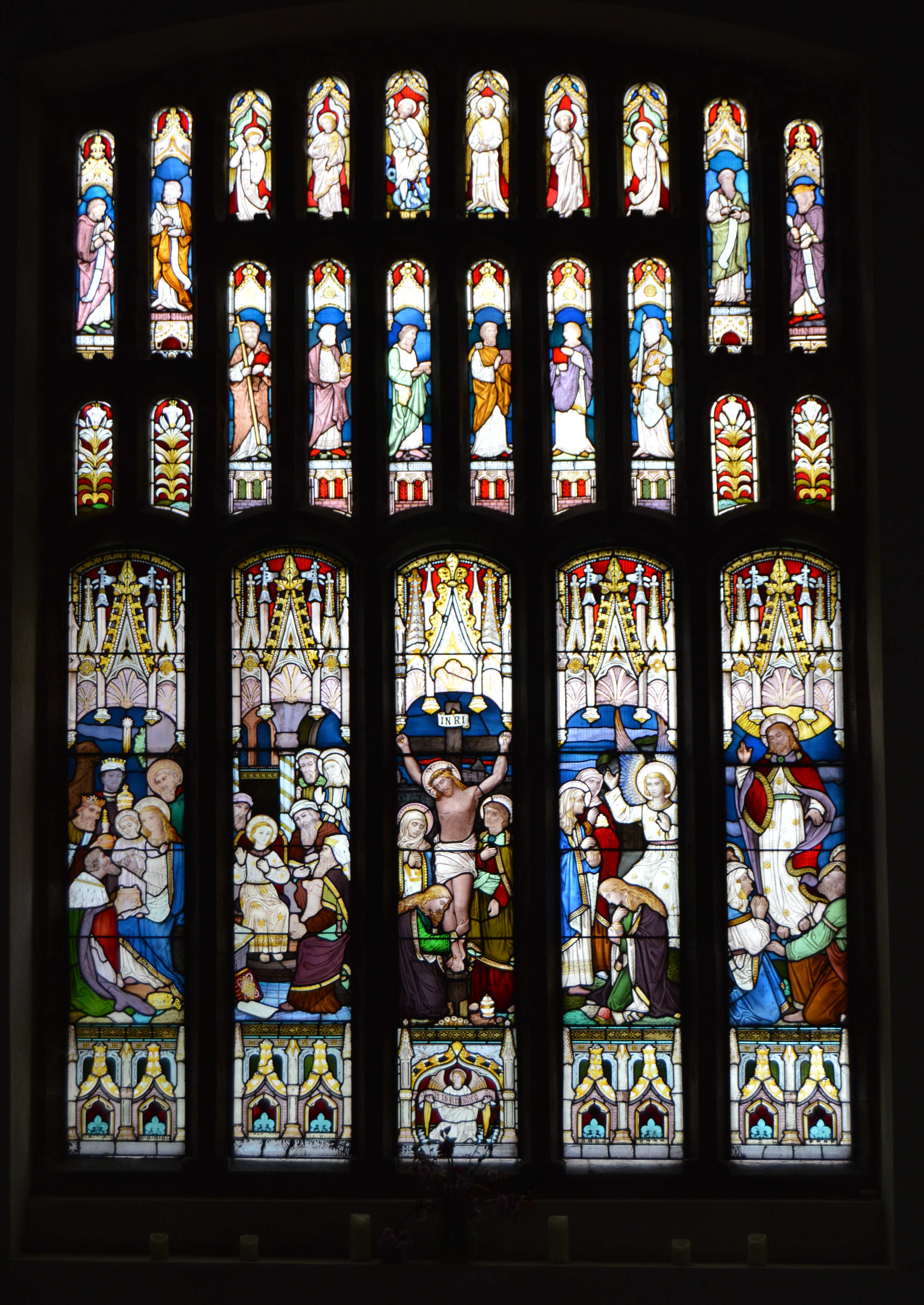
East window

== Burials ==
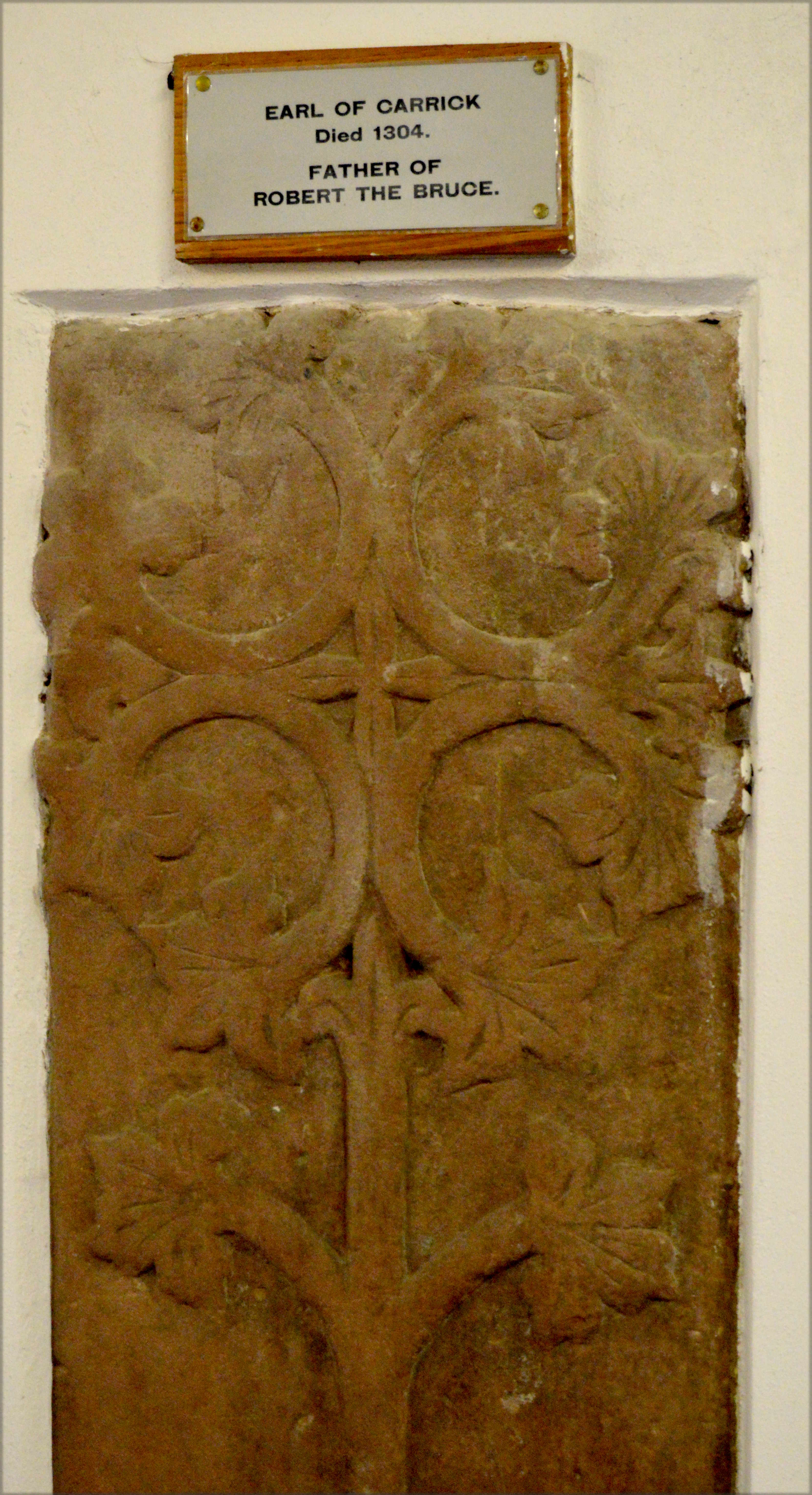
Earl of Carrick stone, Holme Abbey

- Christian of Whithorn
- Robert de Brus, 6th Lord of Annandale

== See also ==
- List of Cistercian monasteries
- Listed buildings in Holme Abbey
- List of English abbeys, priories and friaries serving as parish churches

== Sources ==
- New, Anthony, 1985: A Guide to the Abbeys of England and Wales. London: Constable ISBN 009463520X
- Robinson, David (ed.), 2002: The Cistercian Abbeys of Britain. London: B.T. Batsford ISBN 0713487275
