= B5302 road =

Road in Cumbria, England

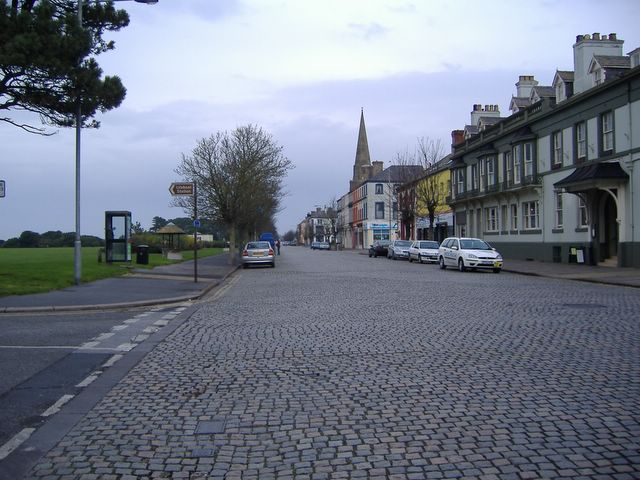
The B5302's western terminus is at Silloth-on-Solway, where it is paved by cobblestones.

The B5302 is a B road which runs for approximately twelve-and-a-quarter miles between the towns of Silloth-on-Solway and Wigton in Cumbria, England. From west to east, it passes through the villages of Causewayhead, Calvo, Abbeytown, Wheyrigg, and Waverbridge, and also passes near to Blackdyke and Blencogo. At its eastern end, it comes very close to the Solway Coast Area of Outstanding Natural Beauty, and passes by Silloth Airfield, left over from the Second World War. Several of the villages that the road passes through were formerly served by trains on the single-track Carlisle and Silloth Bay Railway, which closed with the Beeching axe in the 1960s. It is the main road connecting Silloth-on-Solway and surrounding settlements with the A596, and by extension, the city of Carlisle.

== The route ==
=== Silloth-on-Solway to Calvo ===
The B5302's western terminus is in the coastal town of Silloth-on-Solway, at the junction with the B5300 coast road (which runs south to Mawbray, Allonby, and Maryport). As it winds through Silloth, first heading west, then north as Criffel Street, then east as Wigton Road, it is constructed from cobblestones, unchanged from the Victorian era. As Criffel Street, the B5302 passes by many of Silloth's shops and the town's green. Side-roads lead to Silloth docks, the seafront and lifeboat station, and the former site of Silloth railway station.

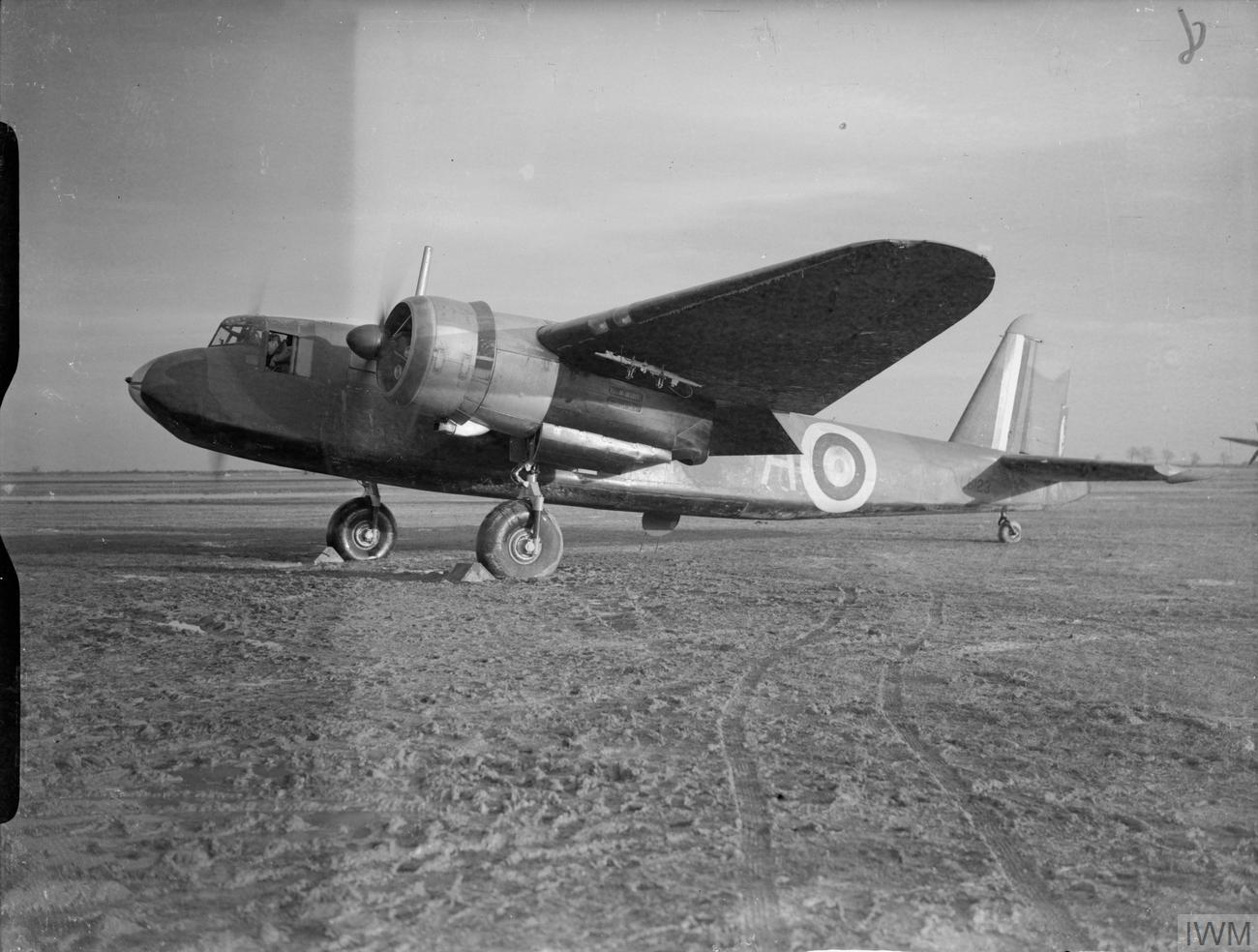
A Blackburn Botha at RAF Silloth, WWII.

As the cobbles give way to tarmac, the road begins heading in an easterly direction out of Silloth-on-Solway. On the outskirts of town it reaches Barracks Bridge, and a quarter-of-a-mile thereafter, Silloth Airfield. This airfield was constructed during the Second World War by RAF Coastal Command, and served primarily as a training base. It was closed in 1960 and today is used for a weekly market and car boot sale.

Half-a-mile past the airfield and the B5302 bends sharply to the left in the small hamlet of Causewayhead, in the civil parish of Holme Low. Two side-roads in quick succession lead south-west to a junction with the B5301 and south-east in the direction of Blackdyke. Also in Causewayhead is Tanglewood Caravan Park, which the B5302 passes on its way through the settlement. The B5302 is now heading in a north-easterly direction as it reaches the hamlet of Calvo, approximately one mile from Causewayhead. Upon entering the hamlet, the road turns sharply once again, heading in a south-easterly direction as it leaves the hamlet towards Abbeytown.

=== Kingside Hill to Wheyrigg ===
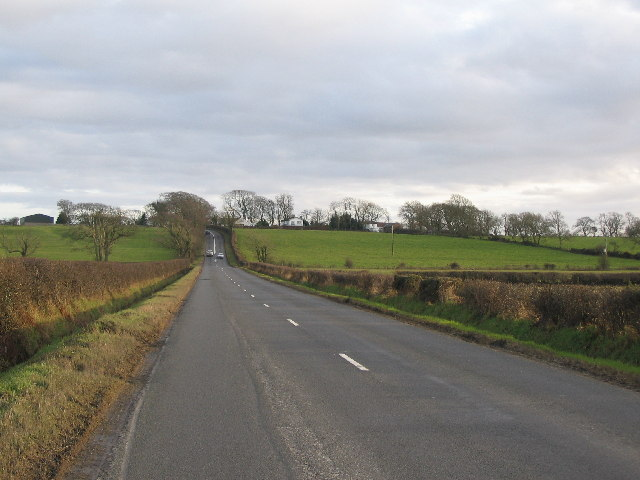
The B5302 at Kingside Hill.

One-and-a-half miles from Calvo, past the side-road that leads to Blackdyke, is Kingside Hill, named for the local legend that King Edward I encamped there during one of the early wars between the Kingdoms of England and Scotland. The B5302 climbs the hill, then bends to the left toward Abbeytown, passing the side-road which leads to Highlaws, Pelutho, and Mawbray.

Entering Abbeytown the speed limit is reduced, and the B5302 passes Abbeytown School and the village shop. Bending sharply to the right part-way through the village, another side-road here leads to the council estate Friars' Garth, as well as Holmcultram Abbey, which was converted into a parish church following the dissolution of the monasteries in the 1530s. The Abbey's 900-year-old roof was destroyed in an arson attack in 2006, but has since been restored thanks to donations from the local community.

On its way out of Abbeytown, the B5302 passes close to the site of the former Abbeytown railway station. After leaving Abbeytown, the road heads in a vaguely south-easterly direction, passing mostly fields with the occasional farmhouse, eventually reaching Wheyrigg after one-and-three-quarter miles. One side-road along this stretch leads to the hamlet of Kelsick.

=== Waverbridge to the Wigton bypass ===
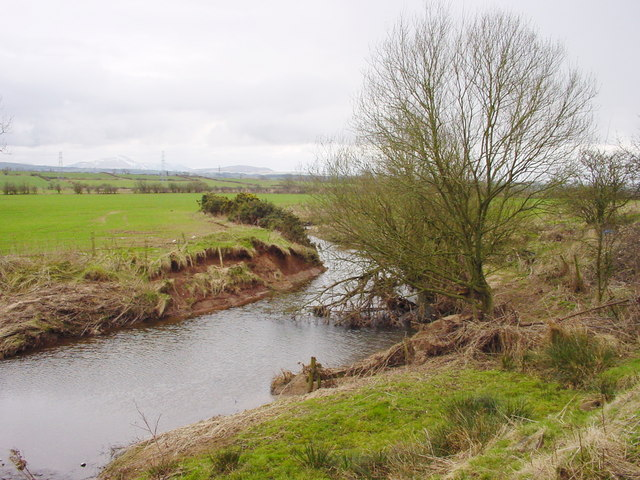
River Waver at Waverbridge.

After another mile-and-a-half of scattered farmhouses and fields, the B5302 arrives in Waverbridge, where it descends to cross over the River Waver. A side-road just beyond Waverbridge takes a different route into Wigton, passing Wigton cemetery and arriving at Station Hill.

The B5302's route, however, continues through the fields for just over a mile. As it approaches the junction with the A596, the road's previous route (before the Wigton bypass was constructed) into Wigton is still visible, though no longer used. As it approaches Wigton, there is a staggered crossroads which means that the two sections of the B5302 don't join up with one another.

=== Through Wigton town centre ===
Having crossed over the A596 at the staggered crossroads, the B5302 enters Wigton, crossing over the Cumbria Coast Line in the process. It passes the Greenacres council estate and then the Innovia factory, the town's largest employer. The road then narrows considerably as it enters Wigton town centre. The difficulty in navigating this part of Wigton was one of the main reasons for the construction of the Wigton bypass in the early 1990s.

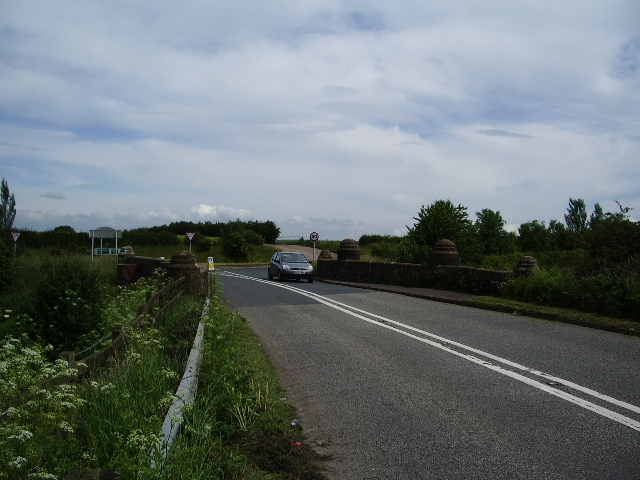
Eastern terminus of the B5302.

In the centre of Wigton is the town's monument, built in 1872 and now a listed monument. Turning right at the monument leads to the Nelson Thomlinson School after a quarter-of-a-mile, and eventually out of Wigton on the B5304 bound for Red Dial and the A595. Turning left just past the monument leads to Wigton railway station. The B5302, now called King Street, continues in an easterly direction out of the town centre, running almost parallel with the Cumbria Coast Line. It crosses over the railway line approximately one mile after leaving the town centre, and this marks the eastern terminus of the road at the junction with the A596. King Street, now without the B5302 designation, continues in an easterly direction for another two-and-a-quarter miles, terminating at the A595 at Woodcock Wood.

== Incidents ==
The B5302 has seen numerous incidents and accidents, including some fatalities. In 2004, a man was killed in an accident involving a car and a coal lorry on the road between Abbeytown and Waverbridge. In 2013, a quad bike rider was left with serious injuries in an accident on the road near Causewayhead, and was airlifted to Newcastle hospital by the Great North Air Ambulance. In November 2018, the road was briefly closed between Abbeytown and Silloth after a lorry collided with a bridge.

== Public transportation ==
Stagecoach Cumbria and North Lancashire run a bus (the number 400) along the B5302 from Silloth-on-Solway to Carlisle. Services are approximately once every two hours in either direction, and there are bus stops in all the villages and hamlets along the route. From Silloth-on-Solway, a connecting bus service (the number 60) runs south down the B5300 coast road to Blitterlees, Beckfoot, Mawbray, Allonby, and ultimately Maryport. From Wigton, connecting trains on the Cumbria Coast Line run approximately once an hour north to Carlisle and south to Whitehaven, and occasionally Barrow-in-Furness and Lancaster.
