= Wolsty =

Hamlet in Cumbria, England

Coordinates: 54.8454°N 3.3949°W

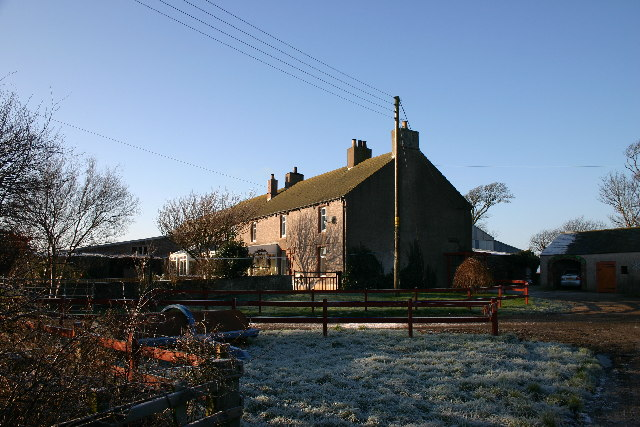
- Wolsty Hall, one of the farms in the hamlet

- Location in Allerdale, Cumbria Location within Cumbria
- OS grid reference: NY104509
- Civil parish: Holme Low
- Unitary authority: Cumberland
- Ceremonial county: Cumbria
- Region: North West
- Country: England
- Sovereign state: United Kingdom
- Post town: WIGTON
- Postcode district: CA7
- Dialling code: 016973
- Police: Cumbria
- Fire: Cumbria
- Ambulance: North West
- UK Parliament: Penrith and Solway

Wolsty is a small hamlet in the civil parish of Holme Low in Cumbria, England. It is located three-and-a-quarter miles south of Silloth-on-Solway, five miles west of Abbeytown, three-and-a-quarter miles north of the village of Mawbray, and twenty-three miles west of Cumbria's county town, Carlisle. The B5300 coast road, which heads north toward Silloth-on-Solway and south to Mawbray, Allonby, and Maryport, is three-quarters of a mile away by road, or less than a quarter of a mile by way of an unpaved farm track.

== History and toponymy ==
The name "Wolsty" is derived from the Old English wulf-stīg, meaning a "wolf-frequented path". There have been several recorded variant spellings, including Woulstie, Worsty, Wristie, Wolmsty, and Ulsty.

The area around Wolsty was fortified during the Roman period, when a series of milefortlets were constructed beyond the western end of Hadrian's Wall to guard against incursions across the Solway Firth. Milefortlets 13 and 14 are located in the vicinity of the hamlet.

During the 14th century, coastal raids by Scots were still commonplace, plaguing settlements like Wolsty. To defend the vulnerable Holme Abbey at nearby Abbeytown, a castle was constructed at Wolsty to defend the coast. After falling into disrepair by the 1570s, attempts to repair the castle were undertaken in the 1630s, but with the kingdoms of England and Scotland edging closer toward friendship, the castle was no longer needed and had been demolished by the year 1700. The castle would have proven formidable to raiding parties; remaining archaeological evidence has shown that there was a moat, and that the walls were over two metres thick. The castle is scheduled under the Ancient Monuments and Archaeological Areas Act 1979 as a site of "national importance". An archaeological dig was carried out on the site in July 2013.

Wolsty also appears to have taken part in the "seawake", a night watch along the coast. Residents of coastal communities took turns standing watch along the coast to guard against raids. In the 1570s, farmers at Wolsty would have had to trek to Dubmill, a little over four miles away past Hailforth and Salta, to grind their grain at the mill there. The hamlet became part of the new parish of Holme Low (previously known as Holme St. Pauls or Low Holme), when it was separated from the parish of Holme Abbey in 1845. This was done following the construction of St. Paul's church at nearby Causewayhead.

== The hamlet today ==
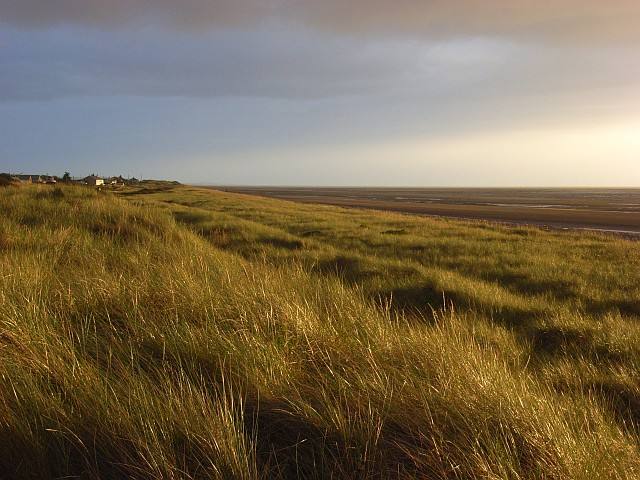
Wolsty Bank with the Solway Firth to the right and the hamlet of Beckfoot just visible in the background to the upper left.

Wolsty today remains a farming settlement, but it is quite small and has no facilities or amenities of its own. The nearest shops are in Silloth-on-Solway, three-and-a-quarter miles to the north, and there is a bus service which runs along the B5300 coast road between Silloth-on-Solway and Maryport approximately every two hours in either direction. At nearby Newtown, there is a farm park and tearoom called the Gincase, and Bank Mill Nurseries, a garden centre with a restaurant and play area, is located just to the north of Beckfoot. The nearest railway station is at Aspatria, seven-and-three-quarter miles to the south-east along the B5301 road. There is a golf course nearby, in the hamlet of Blitterlees.

Wolsty is in the civil parish of Holme Low, and the Cumberland unitary authority area. It is located less than half-a-mile from the boundary with the civil parish of Holme St. Cuthbert. The hamlet's parliamentary constituency is Penrith and Solway.

Wolsty is just outside the southern stretch of the Solway Coast Area of Outstanding Natural Beauty. Wolsty Banks, the area of sand dunes between the hamlet and the sea on the far side of the B5300 coast road, was a designated Site of Special Scientific Interest in 1991, along with nearby Mawbray Banks. The Banks were damaged by a fire in 2013, and could take several years to recover.

== Climate ==
Wolsty, like the rest of the Solway Plain, has an oceanic climate, Köppen climate classification Cfb, with warm summers and cool winters which generally avoid extremes of temperature. Due to its coastal location, Wolsty receives less snowfall than the mountainous Lake District further south in the county. The average high temperature in 19 degrees Celsius in July and August, and the average low temperature is 2 degrees Celsius in December, January, and February. Rainfall is year-round, but more common in the autumn and winter months.

Climate data for Wolsty
Month	Jan	Feb	Mar	Apr	May	Jun	Jul	Aug	Sep	Oct	Nov	Dec	Year
Mean daily maximum °C (°F)	7 (45)	7 (45)	9 (48)	12 (54)	15 (59)	17 (63)	19 (66)	19 (66)	17 (63)	13 (55)	9 (48)	6 (43)	12.5 (54.5)
Mean daily minimum °C (°F)	2 (36)	2 (36)	3 (37)	4 (39)	7 (45)	9 (48)	12 (54)	12 (54)	9 (48)	7 (45)	4 (39)	2 (36)	6 (43)
Average precipitation mm (inches)	93.6 (3.69)	105.1 (4.14)	72.0 (2.83)	63.5 (2.50)	60.1 (2.37)	70.3 (2.77)	58.4 (2.30)	76.2 (3.00)	73.4 (2.89)	109.4 (4.31)	93.2 (3.67)	102.5 (4.04)	977.7 (38.49)
