= Dundraw =

Hamlet and civil parish in Cumbria, England

Coordinates: 54.836°N 3.223°W

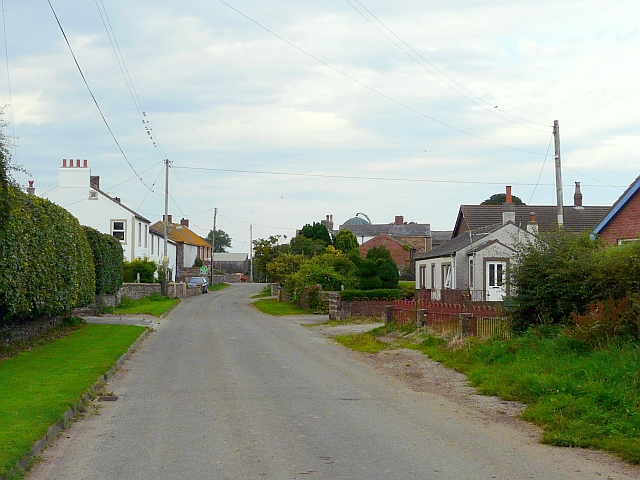
- The hamlet of Dundraw

- Location in Allerdale, Cumbria Location within Cumbria
- Population: 174 (2011)
- OS grid reference: NY215497
- Civil parish: Dundraw
- Unitary authority: Cumberland
- Ceremonial county: Cumbria
- Region: North West
- Country: England
- Sovereign state: United Kingdom
- Post town: WIGTON
- Postcode district: CA7
- Dialling code: 016973
- Police: Cumbria
- Fire: Cumbria
- Ambulance: North West
- UK Parliament: Penrith and Solway

Dundraw is a hamlet and a civil parish near Abbeytown, in the Cumberland district of Cumbria, England. The hamlet is approximately three-and-a-half miles east of Abbeytown, nine-and-a-quarter miles south-east of Silloth-on-Solway, three-and-a-quarter miles north-west of Wigton, and fourteen miles south-west of Carlisle.

== Toponymy ==
The first part of the name is Brittonic drum-, which in etymological terms means "a ridge" (Welsh drum). The second element is *draɣïn, meaning "thorns" (Welsh draen). Alternatively, the name may be derived from Gaelic equivalents of the aforementioned words. The loss of the final syllable is attributed to Old Norse speakers substituting the first element, which Middle English speakers 'translated' as dræġ, meaning "a drag, a steep slope", omitting *–ïn as this was taken to be the Scandinavian suffixed definite article.

== The hamlet ==
Dundraw is a hamlet north of the B5302, which is its nearest main road. The River Waver runs to the east of the hamlet. Dundraw is small, consisting of 59 households according to the 2001 Census. The nearest railway station to Dundraw is Wigton Station, which is about 2 miles away.

Despite Dundraw's relative isolation, house prices follow a similar trend to that of the rest of the UK. In 2012, Dundraw properties sold on average at £60,000 less than the average UK property.

== Governance ==
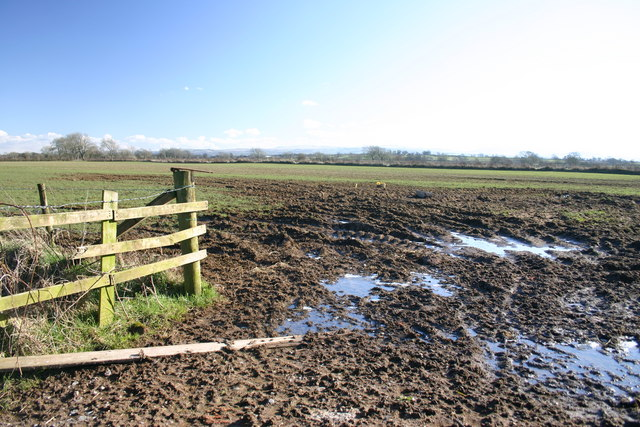
Farmland at Dundraw

The civil parish of Dundraw includes the settlements of Dunrdaw, Kelsick, Moor Row, Waverbridge, and Wheyrigg. The parish is within the area of the Cumberland unitary authority.

== Population ==
Since 1980, the rate of population change has slowed over England and Wales from about 14% annual growth to around 6% annual growth. The rate within Dundraw is much slower than this, but has also fluctuated more than the rest of the country (due to the small population).

According to the 1991 Census, the population of Dundraw was 180; by the 2001 Census this figure had dropped to 160. Compared to other parishes in Cumbria, Dundraw has a relatively high percentage population change rate compared to actual population change, due to the smaller population. The 2001 census indicated that there were 59 households in Dundraw and a population of 167 (79 males and 88 females).

== Attractions ==
Within 17 miles of the centre of Dundraw there are National Trust sites such as Wordsworth House and Borrowdale; and, nature reserves such as Finglandrigg Woods National Nature Reserve and Drumburgh Moss National Nature Reserve.

Places to visit near Dundraw include the River Wampool, which is about 3 miles away as the crow flies. Other nearby villages which are of interest include Kelsick, Lessonhall, Waverbridge and Waverton, which are all less than a mile away from the centre of Dundraw.

=== Places of interest ===
The Finglandrigg Woods National Nature Reserve (CA7 5DR) is about 6 miles away from Dundraw. It mainly consists of lowland grass and woodland areas. The area attracts visitors because of its wildlife; the red squirrel, roe deer, brown hare and wood mouse can all be found here as well as over 40 species of birds. Natural England works to manage and maintain this area and its wildlife.

The Drumburgh Moss National Nature Reserve is about 7 miles away from the centre of Dundraw; it covers about 121.5 hectares of and has a number of walks and trails. There are various different species to be seen depending on the season; the nature reserve is open all year open round.

== See also ==
- Listed buildings in Dundraw
