= Waverbridge =

Hamlet in Cumbria, England

Coordinates: 54.830°N 3.209°W

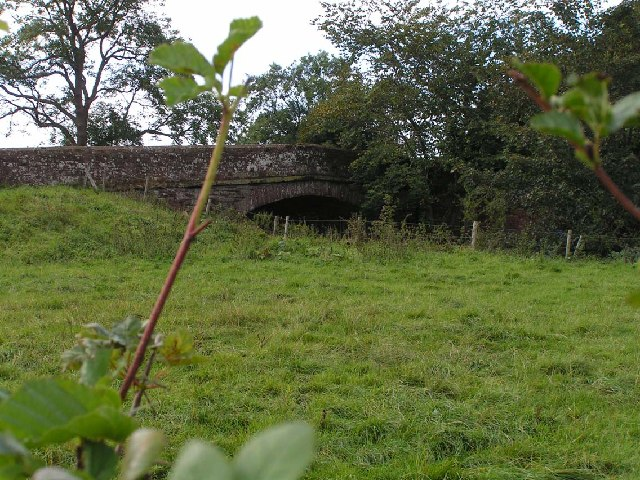
- The sandstone bridge over the River Waver at Waverbridge.

- Location in Allerdale, Cumbria Location within Cumbria
- OS grid reference: NY223490
- Civil parish: Dundraw
- Unitary authority: Cumberland
- Ceremonial county: Cumbria
- Region: North West
- Country: England
- Sovereign state: United Kingdom
- Post town: WIGTON
- Postcode district: CA7
- Dialling code: 016973
- Police: Cumbria
- Fire: Cumbria
- Ambulance: North West
- UK Parliament: Penrith and Solway

Waverbridge is a hamlet in the civil parish of Dundraw, right on the boundary with the civil parish of Waverton in Cumbria, England. It is located approximately two-and-three-quarter miles north-west of Wigton, three-and-three-quarter miles south-east of Abbeytown, and seven-and-a-half miles north-east of Aspatria. Carlisle, Cumbria's county town, is situated fourteen-and-a-quarter miles to the north-east. The B5302 road runs through the settlement, between Silloth-on-Solway in the west and Wigton in the east.

The hamlet is named for its bridge over the River Waver. Historically there was a mill in Waverbridge, as well as a school, both are now used for residential purposes.
