= Causewayhead =

Hamlet in Cumbria, England

Coordinates: 54.864°N 3.362°W

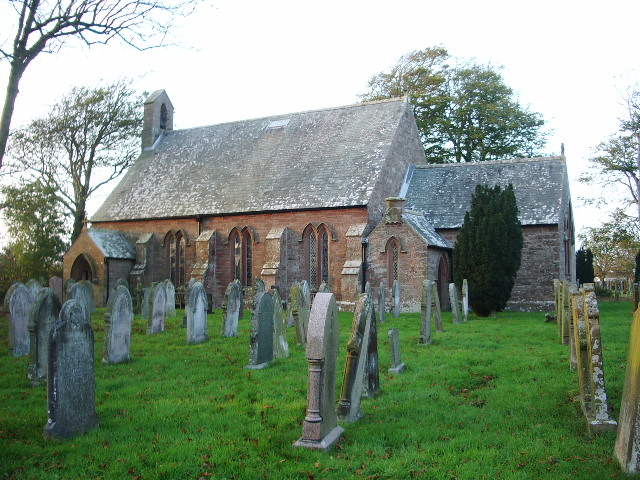
- St. Paul's Church, Causewayhead

- Location in Allerdale, Cumbria Location within Cumbria
- OS grid reference: NY125529
- Civil parish: Holme Low
- Unitary authority: Cumberland
- Ceremonial county: Cumbria
- Region: North West
- Country: England
- Sovereign state: United Kingdom
- Post town: WIGTON
- Postcode district: CA7
- Dialling code: 016973
- Police: Cumbria
- Fire: Cumbria
- Ambulance: North West
- UK Parliament: Penrith and Solway

Causewayhead is a hamlet in the civil parish of Holme Low in Cumbria, England, about 1 mile (2 km) south-east of Silloth. The B5302 road runs through the hamlet on its way to Abbeytown and Wigton.

== See also ==
- Listed buildings in Holme Low
