= Highlaws =

Hamlet in Cumbria, England

Coordinates: 54.835°N 3.336°W

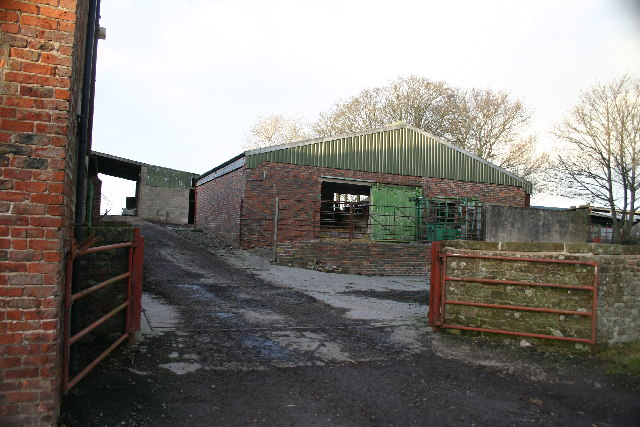
- Farm buildings at Highlaws

- Location in Allerdale, Cumbria Location within Cumbria
- OS grid reference: NY141497
- Civil parish: Holme Abbey
- Unitary authority: Cumberland
- Ceremonial county: Cumbria
- Region: North West
- Country: England
- Sovereign state: United Kingdom
- Post town: WIGTON
- Postcode district: CA7
- Dialling code: 016973
- Police: Cumbria
- Fire: Cumbria
- Ambulance: North West
- UK Parliament: Penrith and Solway

Highlaws is a hamlet in the civil parish of Holme Abbey in Cumbria, England. It is situated approximately two-and-a-quarter miles south-west of Abbeytown, one-and-a-half miles east of Pelutho, and one mile to the north of Aldoth. Other nearby settlements include Mawbray, four-and-a-quarter miles to the south-west, Blitterlees, three miles to the north-west, Blackdyke, two-and-a-quarter miles due north, and Foulsyke. Carlisle, Cumbria's county town, is located twenty miles to the north-east.

== History and toponymy ==
The name of Highlaws comes from the Old English hēah-hlāw, meaning "high mounds". In the past, variant spellings included Heelawes, Hielawes, Highlows, Hielows, and Hylaws.

The hamlet appears in a survey of Holm Cultram dating back to the year 1538, during the reign of Henry VIII. There were at least thirteen families resident in Highlaws at that time.
