= Foulsyke =

Hamlet in Cumbria, England

Coordinates: 54.830°N 3.349°W

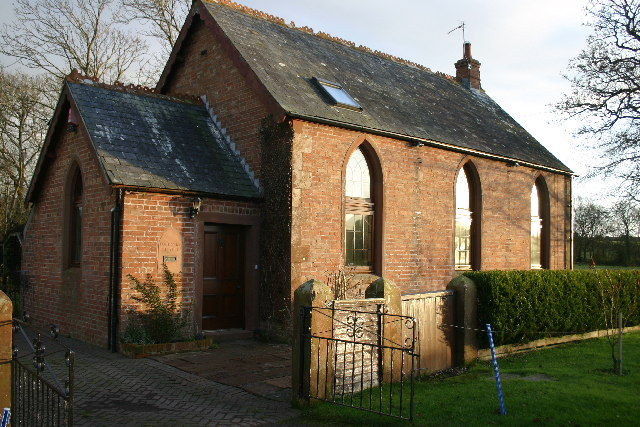
- Foulsyke Chapel, as seen c. 2005.

- Location in Allerdale, Cumbria Location within Cumbria
- OS grid reference: NY133491
- Civil parish: Holme Abbey
- Unitary authority: Cumberland
- Ceremonial county: Cumbria
- Region: North West
- Country: England
- Sovereign state: United Kingdom
- Post town: WIGTON
- Postcode district: CA7
- Dialling code: 016973
- Police: Cumbria
- Fire: Cumbria
- Ambulance: North West
- UK Parliament: Penrith and Solway

Foulsyke is a small hamlet on the boundary between the civil parishes of Holme Abbey and Holme St. Cuthbert in Cumbria, England. It is located just under one mile to the east of Pelutho, three-quarters of a mile south-east of Highlaws, and two-and-a-half miles south-east of Abbeytown. Other nearby settlements include Aldoth, three-quarters of a mile to the south-east, Tarns, one-and-a-half miles to the south-west, and Beckfoot, two-and-a-half miles due east as the crow flies, or four-and-a-half miles by road. Cumbria's county town, Carlisle, is located twenty-one miles away to the north-east.

== History and toponymy ==
The name Foulsyke comes from the Old English ful-sīc, meaning a "dirty stream". There have been several historical variant spellings recorded, including Fowlesyke, Foalsyke, Fullsyke, and Foulsike.

Foulsyke is best known for its former Methodist chapel, which today has been converted into a private dwelling. The chapel was built between 1898 and 1899 by a man named Thomas Hurst, who was 27 years old at the time construction began. The initials of three of the chapel's biggest financial backers were engraved on stones in the wall. Most of the £150 raised to build the chapel was donated by local farming families. Hurst died in 1906, and his funeral was held in the chapel he'd built. Thomas' wife, Sarah Ann Hurst, took over running the chapel when he died, and continued to do so until she retired in 1947. The chapel ran its own Sunday school, and continued to do so even when only a single pupil remained in the 1970s. The chapel's Harvest Festival was one of its congregation's favourite times of year, and it was just after the Harvest Festival in 1992 when, due to falling numbers in the congregation (down from dozens to just six regulars) that the chapel was closed. It was later converted to a private residence.
