= Kelsick =

Hamlet in Cumbria, England

Coordinates: 54.84°N 3.25°W

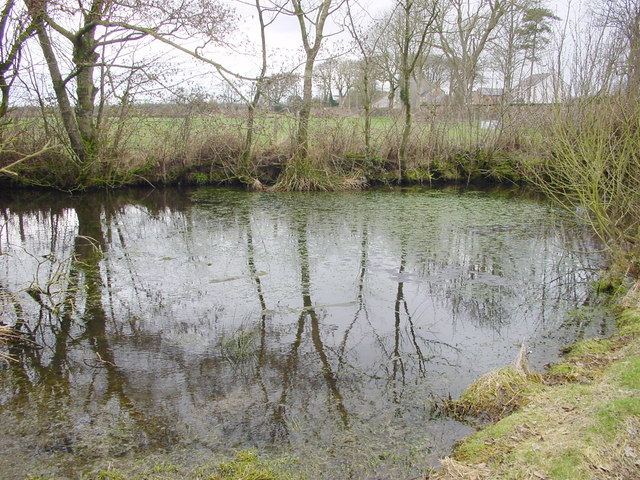
- Pond at Kelsick.

- Location in Allerdale, Cumbria Location within Cumbria
- OS grid reference: NY 20265 50206
- Civil parish: Dundraw
- Unitary authority: Cumberland
- Ceremonial county: Cumbria
- Region: North West
- Country: England
- Sovereign state: United Kingdom
- Post town: WIGTON
- Postcode district: CA7
- Dialling code: 016973
- Police: Cumbria
- Fire: Cumbria
- Ambulance: North West
- UK Parliament: Penrith and Solway

Kelsick is a hamlet in the civil parish of Dundraw in Cumbria, England. It is located approximately 1.8 miles (2.9 km) southeast of Abbeytown, 0.9 miles (1.4 km) northwest of Dundraw, and 14.5 miles (23.3 km) west of Carlisle, Cumbria's county town. Kelsick is accessed by two side-roads off the B5302 road, which runs between Silloth and Wigton.

== Toponymy ==
The name Kelsick is believed to be derived from an Anglo-Saxon word meaning "a spring" or "a well".

== History ==
On 7 July 1942, a Miles Master aircraft from RAF Annan crashed near Kelsick, with the loss of one life. A second occupant of the aircraft was able to successfully bail out before the crash. A rescue party from nearby RAF Kirkbride was assembled, but boggy ground, excess water, and fading light led to the attempt being called off. An engine from the aircraft was recovered in 1976.

In 1990, a pond at Kelsick was restored by local conservationists.

== Amenities ==
The area is administered as part of the Cumberland unitary authority. The local council provides refuse collection, street lighting, and other services to residents of Kelsick. Stagecoach Cumbria & North Lancashire provides a bus service, the number 400, which runs near to Kelsick along the B5302 road. The bus runs approximately every two hours from Monday to Saturday between Silloth and Carlisle. The nearest railway station is at Wigton, approximately 4.1 miles (6.6 km) to the southeast. The nearest primary school, Holme Cultram Abbey school, is located in Abbeytown, and the nearest secondary school, The Nelson Thomlinson School, is in Wigton.

== Climate ==
Kelsick, like the rest of the Solway Plain, has an oceanic climate (Köppen climate classification Cfb), with mild summers and winters which generally avoid extremes of temperature. At nearby Abbeytown, average daytime high temperatures were 17 °C (63 °F) in summer and 5 °C (41 °F) in winter, with average overnight lows of 11 °C (52 °F) in the summer months and 2 °C (36 °F) in the winter. Rainfall is fairly consistent throughout the year, with approximately 15 days a month where measurable rainfall occurs.
