= Milefortlet 12 =

Milefortlet of the Roman Cumbrian Coast defences

- Location within the former Allerdale Borough Location within Cumbria
- 54.859734°N 3.396966°W
- Type: Milecastle
- Location: Blitterlees, Cumbria, England

Milefortlet 12 (Blitterlees) was a Milefortlet of the Roman Cumbrian Coast defences. These milefortlets and intervening stone watchtowers extended from the western end of Hadrian's Wall, along the Cumbrian coast and were linked by a wooden palisade. They were contemporary with defensive structures on Hadrian's Wall. There is little to see on the ground but Milefortlet 12 has been located and excavated. The milefortlet is located close to the hamlet of Blitterlees, in the civil parish of Holme Low.

== Description ==
Milefortlet 12 is situated southwest of the village of Silloth in the same parish. The site is damaged by wind erosion and quarrying, and it is covered by vegetation. Substantial earthworks were identified in 1963, and the site was excavated in 1967. The excavations showed that the fort was originally of turf and timber construction.

A Roman coin hoard of 20 to 30 coins of Vespasian was found 700 metres to the east (at "Greenrow School") in 1841.

== Associated Towers ==
Each milefortlet had two associated towers, similar in construction to the turrets built along Hadrian's Wall. These towers were positioned approximately one-third and two-thirds of a Roman mile to the west of the Milefortlet, and would probably have been manned by part of the nearest Milefortlet's garrison. The towers associated with Milefortlet 12 are known as Tower 12A (grid reference NY10265212) and Tower 12B (grid reference NY10095162).

Tower 12A was discovered in 1963 as a hillock among the ancient sand-hills. It was excavated in 1966, and was found to have been originally 6 metres square, with later repairs reducing the size to 6 metres by 4.5 metres. Tower 12B was discovered in 1955 and excavated in 1956. The excavations uncovered five hearths, and sherds of cooking pots, one of which had been mended with a lead rivet.
