= Greenrow =

Hamlet in Cumbria, England

Coordinates: 54.860°N 3.385°W

- Location in Allerdale, Cumbria Location within Cumbria
- OS grid reference: NY111525
- Civil parish: Holme Low/Silloth-on-Solway
- Unitary authority: Cumberland
- Ceremonial county: Cumbria
- Region: North West
- Country: England
- Sovereign state: United Kingdom
- Post town: WIGTON
- Postcode district: CA7
- Dialling code: 016973
- Police: Cumbria
- Fire: Cumbria
- Ambulance: North West
- UK Parliament: Penrith and Solway

Greenrow is a hamlet in Cumbria, England. It is located about 10 miles west of Wigton, near the town of Silloth.
