= Aldoth =

Hamlet in Cumbria, England

Coordinates: 54.825°N 3.334°W

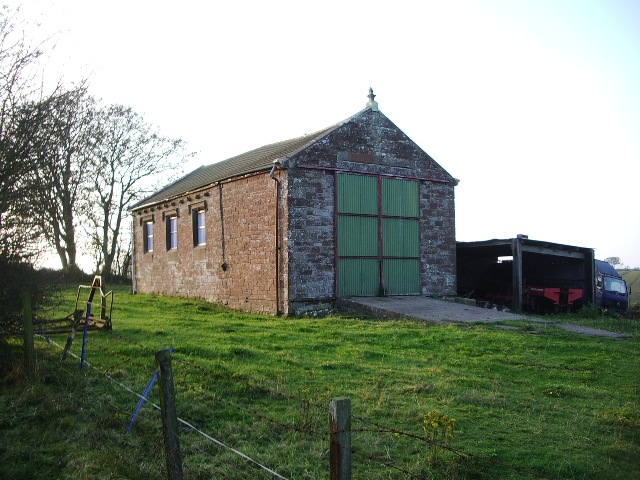
- Formerly Aldoth school, the building now appears to be used as a barn.

- Location in Allerdale, Cumbria Location within Cumbria
- OS grid reference: NY143486
- Civil parish: Holme Abbey
- Unitary authority: Cumberland
- Ceremonial county: Cumbria
- Region: North West
- Country: England
- Sovereign state: United Kingdom
- Post town: WIGTON
- Postcode district: CA7
- Dialling code: 016973
- Police: Cumbria
- Fire: Cumbria
- Ambulance: North West
- UK Parliament: Penrith and Solway

Aldoth is a hamlet in the civil parish of Holme Abbey in Cumberland, Cumbria, England. It is situated approximately two-and-a-half miles south-west of Abbeytown, one-and-a-quarter miles south of Highlaws, and two-and-a-quarter miles north-east of the hamlet of Holme St. Cuthbert. Other nearby settlements include Pelutho, a mile-and-a-half to the north-west, Mawbray, four miles to the south-west, and Westnewton, three-and-three-quarter miles to the south. Cumbria's county town, Carlisle, is located twenty-and-a-half miles to the north-east.

== History and toponymy ==
Aldoth's name comes from the Old English eald hlada, meaning "old barn". In the past, variant spellings have included Ialdlathyt, Aldath, Aldeth, and Aldelathe.

Aldoth was mentioned in a survey conducted in the year 1538, during the reign of Henry VIII. Then known as Aldeth, the survey recorded that there were at least ten families living in the community.

In 1851, a school was built in Aldoth, paid for by the National Organisation for Education of the Poor. There were as many as 55 pupils enrolled in the school at its height, though numbers were known to drop rather dramatically around harvest time and during bad weather. School inspectors noted several issues with the school, such as the lack of nearby accommodation for a teacher, insufficient space for the number of pupils, and animals "which invade the cloak-rooms and attack the food stored for midday use". Despite eventually being connected to water mains, the school continued to make use of earth toilets. There was a high turnover of teachers in the early 20th century, but by 1929 the school had more stability when Mr Carr arrived. He remained the teacher until Aldoth school closed in 1957.

== Aldoth show ==
An agricultural show took place at Aldoth until at least the 1960s. It was an annual event, usually taking place in August, and would attract visitors from all over the local area. Prizes were awarded for livestock, vegetables, baking, knitting, jam-making, and handicrafts, and the local pub erected a beer tent for the duration of the show. Hound trailing took place, as did harness racing and sulky trotting, and bets were often placed on the outcome of these events. The grand finale would involve a parade of award-winning livestock. In the evening after the show, a dance was often held in Aldoth school.

=== Poem ===
A poem in Cumbrian dialect was composed in honour of Aldoth show, sometime around the year 1911.

Than here's success't Aldoth show,
Ta't offocials good health,
We'll wish them free fra ivvery cus
An blest wid ivvery wealth,
May old dame fortune hover round
An smile upon them o'
An that weather chap just lift his cup,
Ta favour Aldoth Show.

— Unknown, 1911
