= Milefortlet 11 =

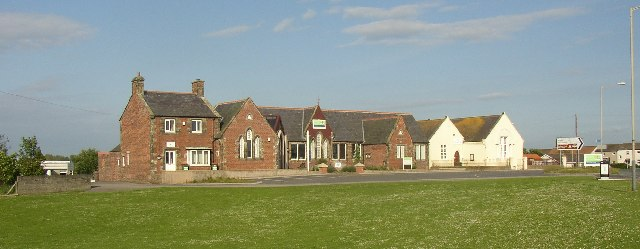
- The Solway Coast Discovery Centre is thought to be the site of Milefortlet 11

- Location within the former Allerdale Borough Location within Cumbria
- 54.871814°N 3.385852°W
- Type: Milecastle
- Location: Cumbria, England

Milefortlet 11 was a Milefortlet of the Roman Cumbrian Coast defences. These milefortlets and intervening stone watchtowers extended from the western end of Hadrian's Wall, along the Cumbrian coast and were linked by a wooden palisade. They were contemporary with defensive structures on Hadrian's Wall. Milefortlet 11 has never been accurately located on the ground although other Roman remains have been found in the area.

== Description ==
Milefortlet 11 is thought to lie at the north end of the village of Silloth. It has never been located by archaeologists, but its approximate position has calculated from the known positions of other fortlets along the Cumbrian coast. It is thought to lie near the former school (now the Solway Coast Discovery Centre).

Around 200 metres northeast of the site is the buried remains of a 250-metre length of the linear defensive system forming part of the Roman frontier defences. Aerial photographs show the cropmarks of two ditches running parallel to the coast. Limited excavation of the ditches suggest that the ditches were designed to hold a timber palisade fence. A Roman road runs behind the palisade ditches for some distance then turns into a three-sided enclosure which has been interpreted as a possible Roman camp. The interpretation of this enclosure as a Roman camp has however, been dismissed by some archaeologists. Some ancient field boundaries can also be seen on aerial photographs.

Around 500 metres to the east of the site is a Roman enclosed settlement and field system. It was excavated in 1974/5 and 1977, and was found to date to the 3rd century. The site consisted of a sub-rectangular enclosure which was revetted and had a palisade on its bank; it contained a round house, a rectangular structure, and possible stock pens.

== Associated Towers ==
Each milefortlet had two associated towers, similar in construction to the turrets built along Hadrian's Wall. These towers were positioned approximately one-third and two-thirds of a Roman mile to the west of the Milefortlet, and would probably have been manned by part of the nearest Milefortlet's garrison. The towers associated with Milefortlet 11 are known as Tower 11A (grid reference NY10915343) and Tower 11B (grid reference NY10675300). The locations of both towers are uncertain, and their positions have been estimated by measurement to adjoining Roman frontier works. The site of Tower 11A is under buildings in Silloth; the site of Tower 11B is now under Blitterlees Golf Course.
