= Waverton =

Waverton is any of the following places:

- Waverton, Cheshire, a civil parish in Cheshire, England.
- Waverton, Cumbria, a civil parish in Cumbria, England.
- Waverton, New South Wales, a suburb of Sydney, Australia.
