= Calvo, Cumbria =

Hamlet in Cumbria, England

Coordinates: 54.871°N 3.335°W

Calvo
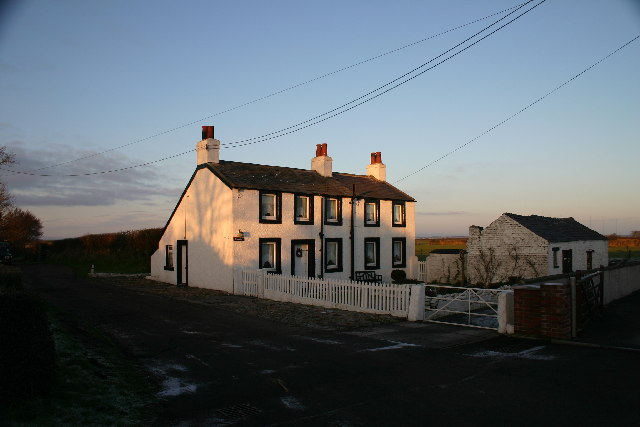
- Farmhouse, Calvo

- Location in Allerdale, Cumbria Location within Cumbria
- OS grid reference: NY143537
- Civil parish: Holme Low
- Unitary authority: Cumberland
- Ceremonial county: Cumbria
- Region: North West
- Country: England
- Sovereign state: United Kingdom
- Post town: WIGTON
- Postcode district: CA7
- Dialling code: 016973
- Police: Cumbria
- Fire: Cumbria
- Ambulance: North West
- UK Parliament: Penrith and Solway

Calvo is a hamlet in Cumbria, England.

== See also ==
- Listed buildings in Holme Low
