= Listed buildings in Waverton, Cumbria =

Waverton is a civil parish in the Cumberland district, Cumbria, England. It contains 13 listed buildings that are recorded in the National Heritage List for England. All the listed buildings are designated at Grade II, the lowest of the three grades, which is applied to "buildings of national importance and special interest". The parish contains the villages of Waverton and Lessonhall, and is otherwise rural. Most of the listed buildings are houses and associated structures, or farmhouses and farm buildings, the other listed building being a disused and derelict water mill.

== Buildings ==
Name and location	Photograph	Date	Notes
Middle Yard; 54.84011°N 3.21174°W	—	1664	A farmhouse with cement rendered clay walls and a roof mainly of Welsh slate with some sandstone slate. There are two storeys and three bays. The entrance has a chamfered surround, a shaped, inscribed and dated lintel, and a hood mould. The windows are sashes in stone surrounds.
Todcroft and former barn 54.81681°N 3.20631°W	—	Late 17th century (probable)	The farmhouse, now a private house, and the former barn are rendered, and have a green slate roof with coped gables. The house has two storeys and two bays, with the former barn to the right. The doorway and casement windows have stone surrounds. At the rear is an original small chamfered window in the upper floor. Inside the house is a bressumer, and in the upper floor are two pairs of upper crucks.
Waver Bridge Farmhouse and barns 54.82957°N 3.21055°W	—	Early 18th century	The farmhouse and barns are in brick with green slate roofs. The house incorporates part of an earlier house dated 1670, it has two storeys and five bays with a projection at the rear. The doorway and windows are in architraves. At the rear is a doorway with an inscribed lintel. The house is flanked by two-storey barns dating from the late 18th or early 19th century. The barn openings include a cart entry, a loft door, and ventilation slits.
Steel's Farmhouse and barns 54.84098°N 3.21349°W	—	Mid or late 18th century	The house is in stucco on brick, and has a green slate roof. There are two storeys and three bays. The main doorway has a pilastered surround and a pediment, and to the right is a doorway with a chamfered surround, a Tudor arched head, and a hood mould. The windows are sashes in stone surrounds. To the right are barns in an L-shaped plan, partly in brick with a tile roof, and partly in sandstone with a sandstone slate roof. The barns contain a large cart entrance, doorways, left doors, and ventilation slits.
High Crosshill; 54.79932°N 3.18913°W	—	Late 18th century	A sandstone farmhouse on a chamfered plinth, with quoins and a green slate roof with coped gables. There are two storeys and three bays, with a lower two-storey single-bay wing to the right. The doorway has a pilastered surround, a pediment, and a fanlight, and the sash windows have stone surrounds.
Lesson Hall; 54.83929°N 3.21207°W	—	Late 18th century	A stuccoed farmhouse with quoins, an eaves cornice, and a green slate roof. There are two storeys and three bays, with a single-bay extension to the right. On the front is a porch with two Tuscan columns, a frieze and a dentilled cornice. The windows are sashes, those in the main part having architraves, and those in the extension having stone surrounds. At the rear is a Venetian stair window.
Parkgate Farmhouse; 54.81019°N 3.22224°W	—	Late 18th century	The farmhouse is in sandstone on a chamfered plinth, with quoins, an eaves cornice, and a green slate roof with coped gables. It has two storeys and three bays. The doorway has an architrave and a pediment, and the sash windows also have architraves.
Hawkrigg House; 54.80699°N 3.18862°W	—	1824	A stuccoed farmhouse on a moulded plinth, with quoins, an eaves cornice, and a green slate roof with lead hips. It has two storeys and three bays that are flanked by lower two-storey two-bay wings. In the centre is a porch with two Doric columns, a swag frieze, and a dentilled cornice. The porch is flanked by Venetian sash windows under round arches, and elsewhere the windows are sashes. The wings have open pedimented gables containing round attic windows.
Blaithwaite House; 54.79143°N 3.22509°W	—	Early 19th century	The house has been extended and later used for other purposes. It is in sandstone on a chamfered plinth, and has quoins, an eaves cornice, and a green slate roof. There are two storeys and five bays, with a lower two-storey, four-bay extension to the right, and 20th-century extensions to the rear. On the front is a porch with square columns, an entablature, a frieze, and a fanlight. The windows in the original part are sashes, and in the extension they are casements. At the rear is a blocked carriage entrance, and in the rear extension are datestones and a mullioned window.
Waver House; 54.81926°N 3.19250°W	—	Early 19th century	A sandstone house on a chamfered plinth, with quoins and a green slate roof. There are two storeys with an attic, and three bays. The doorway has a Tuscan doorcase, an ornamental frieze, a dentilled cornice, and a fanlight. The windows are sashes with stone surrounds, and on the left end wall is an oval attic window.
Old Mill; 54.84113°N 3.21137°W		1834	The former water corn mill is unused and derelict. It is in sandstone with quoins, and has two storeys and three bays. There is a two-storey single-bay gabled projection, and a single-storey lean-to. Part of the mill is built over the mill race, and has two arched water channels.
Gazebo, Blaithwaite House; 54.79246°N 3.22561°W	—	Early or mid 19th century	The gazebo stands on an island in a pond in the garden of the house, and is reached by a bridge. It is in sandstone, and has a Welsh slate roof with coped gables and finials. The gazebo has an octagonal plan, is in a single storey, and each face is gabled. The doorway has a pilastered surround and an ogee head, and the windows also have ogee arches.
Stable block, dovecote and barn, Blaithwaite House; 54.79118°N 3.22541°W	—	Early or mid 19th century	The former stables, dovecote and barn have later been used for other purposes. They are in sandstone with quoins and green slate roofs. The stable has two storeys, with a single-storey extension at right angles on one side, and the barn at right angles on the other side, forming a U-shaped plan; the two-storey dovecote is in the angle. The openings include sash and casement windows, doors, a cart entrance, and pigeon holes. External steps lead to a first-floor loft in the dovecote.
