= Pelutho =

Hamlet in Cumbria, England

Coordinates: 54.828°N 3.369°W

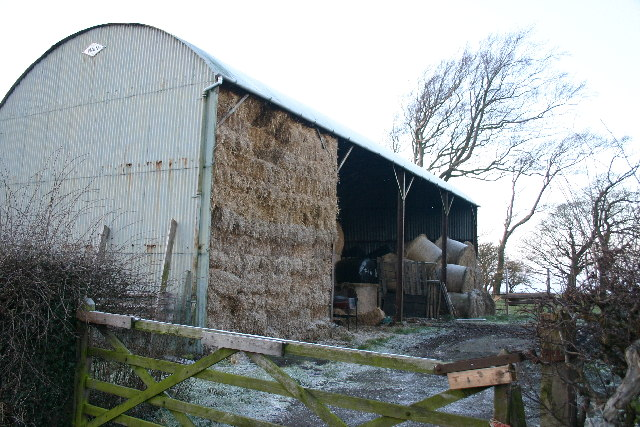
- A hay barn in the frost at Pelutho

- Location in Allerdale, Cumbria Location within Cumbria
- OS grid reference: NY120489
- Civil parish: Holme St Cuthbert
- Unitary authority: Cumberland
- Ceremonial county: Cumbria
- Region: North West
- Country: England
- Sovereign state: United Kingdom
- Post town: WIGTON
- Postcode district: CA7
- Dialling code: 016973
- Police: Cumbria
- Fire: Cumbria
- Ambulance: North West
- UK Parliament: Penrith and Solway

Pelutho is a hamlet in the civil parish of Holme St. Cuthbert in Cumbria, historically in Cumberland, England.

It is situated on the B5301 road between the towns of Aspatria and Silloth. The village of Mawbray is located 3.0 miles (5 kilometres) to the south-west, and the village of Abbeytown is located 3.5 miles (6 kilometres) to the north-east. Carlisle, is located 21.5 miles (35 kilometres) to the east.

== Toponymy ==
The name "Pelutho" is derived from the Old Norse pil-oat-haugr, meaning "peeled-oats hill". In the past, the name has been written in several different forms, including Pellathow, Pellothoe, Pollathow, Pellithow, and Pelato.

== History ==
During the Roman period, the area around Pelutho was fortified. A series of milefortlets were constructed beyond the western end of Hadrian's Wall to defend against incursions across the Solway Firth. Two of these, milefortlets 13 and 14, are located within 2 miles (3 kilometres) of Pelutho, near the hamlets of Blitterlees and Beckfoot respectively.

== Governance ==
Pelutho is part of the parliamentary constituency of Penrith and Solway.

For Local Government purposes it is in the Cumberland unitary authority area.

== Travel ==
No public transport services are available in Pelutho; the nearest railway station is at Aspatria, 5.5 miles (9 kilometres) to the south-east, and the nearest bus stop is at Beckfoot, 3.5 miles (6 kilometres) away by road.
