= Blackdyke =

Hamlet in Cumbria, England

Coordinates: 54.859°N 3.335°W

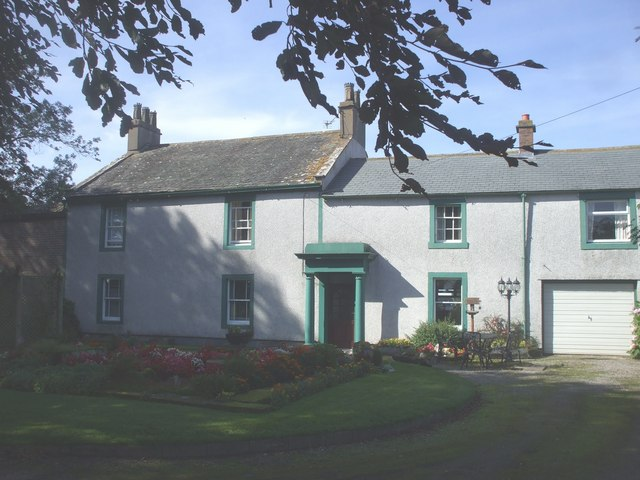
- Blackdyke Farm

- Location in Allerdale, Cumbria Location within Cumbria
- OS grid reference: NY143524
- Civil parish: Holme Low
- Unitary authority: Cumberland
- Ceremonial county: Cumbria
- Region: North West
- Country: England
- Sovereign state: United Kingdom
- Post town: WIGTON
- Postcode district: CA7
- Dialling code: 016973
- Police: Cumbria
- Fire: Cumbria
- Ambulance: North West
- UK Parliament: Penrith and Solway

Blackdyke is a hamlet in the civil parish of Holme Low in Cumbria, England. It is located 3.5 miles (5.6 km) by road to the east of Silloth. A railway station existed at Blackdyke Halt on the line to Silloth until 1964.

== See also ==
- Listed buildings in Holme Low
- List of places in Cumbria
