= Listed buildings in Dundraw =

Dundraw is a civil parish in the Cumberland district of Cumbria, England. It contains six listed buildings that are recorded in the National Heritage List for England. All the listed buildings are designated at Grade II, the lowest of the three grades, which is applied to "buildings of national importance and special interest". The parish, apart from small settlements, is entirely rural. All the listed buildings are farmhouses and farm buildings.

== Buildings ==
Name and location	Photograph	Date	Notes
Limes Farmhouse and barn 54.83702°N 3.22290°W	—	Late 17th century	The farmhouse and the barn to the right have whitewashed clay walls repaired in stone, and a green slate roof. The house has two storeys and two bays. The windows are sashes, and there is a doorway with a chamfered surround and a shaped and dated lintel. In the barn is a garage door.
Kelsick House; 54.84038°N 3.25419°W	—	Late 18th century	A pebbledashed farmhouse on a chamfered plinth, with quoins and a Welsh slate roof. It has two storeys and three bays, with a lower two-storey hipped roof extension to the left. The doorway has an Ionic pedimented doorcase, and the windows are sashes.
Croft House; 54.83153°N 3.23439°W	—	Late 18th or early 19th century	A sandstone farmhouse on a chamfered plinth with quoins and a Welsh slate roof. It has an extension in mixed cobbles and sandstone rubble. The house has two storeys and three bays, with a single-bay extension to the right. The doorway has a pedimented cornice. Most of the windows are sashes, and there is one small casement window in the extension.
Moor Row Hall; 54.83158°N 3.23391°W	—	Early 19th century	A farmhouse mainly in brick on a chamfered plinth, with quoins and a green slate roof. It has two storeys and three bays, with an extension to the right in cobbles and brick. The doorway has a fanlight and a pediment, and the windows are sashes.
The Cottage and barn 54.83696°N 3.22296°W	—	Early 19th century	The farmhouse and the barn to the rear have green slate roofs. The house is stuccoed on a chamfered plinth, and has angle pilasters and an eaves cornice. There are two storeys and two bays. The door has a radial fanlight, and the windows are sashes. The barn is in mixed cobbles and sandstone, and contains plank doors and ventilation slits.
The Laurels and barn 54.83750°N 3.22247°W	—	Undated	The farmhouse and the barn to the left have a green slate roof. The house is in brick, and has two storeys and three bays. The windows are sashes, and the doorway has a quoined surround. The front wall of the barn is rendered and whitewashed and contains three ventilation slits. The side wall is in mixed cobble and sandstone rubble, and contains a blocked doorway. The rear wall has been rebuilt and contains 20th-century casement windows.
