= John O'Neil (rugby league) =

English rugby league footballer

Personal information
- Full name: Edward John O'Neil
- Born: 1937 Maryport, England
- Died: 2016

Playing information
- Height: 6 ft 1 in (1.85 m)
- Weight: 14 st 0 lb (89 kg)
- Position: Centre, Second-row
Club
Years	Team	Pld	T	G	FG	P
1956–66	Workington Town	271	117	0	1	353
Representative
Years	Team	Pld	T	G	FG	P
1958–64	Cumberland	13	10	0	0	30

Edward John O'Neil (1937 – 2016), also known by the nickname of "Loppylugs" (after the horse that won the 1956 Cambridgeshire Handicap), often shortened "Loppy", was an English professional rugby league footballer who played in the 1950s and 1960s. He played at representative level for England (Under-21s) and Cumberland, and at club level for Ellenborough ARLFC (in Ellenborough, Cumbria), Risehow ARLFC (in Risehow, associated with Flimby Colliery in Flimby) and Workington Town, as a centre or second-row.

== Background ==
O'Neil was born in Ellenborough, Maryport, Cumberland in 1937. He moved with his family to nearby Netherton when he was still a baby, he went to school at; Netherton Infants, Maryport British School, and Solway House Secondary School (where he first played rugby league), he left school aged-15 to start work as an apprentice moldmaker at Distington Engineering Company (Chapel Bank), Workington,

== Playing career ==
=== International honours ===
O'Neil won a cap playing second-row for England (Under-21s) in the 10-8 victory over France (Under-21s) at Tarbes, France on Sunday 15 April 1956.

=== County honours ===
O'Neil won caps for Cumberland while at Workington, he made his début for Cumberland in the victory over Yorkshire at Recreation Ground, Whitehaven during 1958, he played centre (alongside Dick Huddart), and scored four tries (equalling Jack Coulson's Cumberland county record set in 1932, no one has emulated this record since) in the 43-19 victory over Yorkshire at Recreation Ground, Whitehaven on Wednesday 14 September 1960, and he played in Cumberland's victories in the County Championship during the 1961–62 season and 1963–64 season.

=== Challenge Cup Final appearances ===
O'Neil played at centre in Workington Town's 9–13 defeat by Wigan in the 1958 Challenge Cup Final during the 1957–58 season at Wembley Stadium, London on Saturday 10 May 1958.

=== Championship final appearances ===
O'Neil played in Workington Town's 3–20 defeat by Hull F.C. in the Championship Final during the 1957–58 season at Odsal Stadium, Bradford on Saturday 17 May 1958.

=== Western Division Championship Final appearances ===
O'Neil played at centre in Workington Town's 9-9 draw with Widnes in the Western Division Championship Final during the 1962–63 season at Central Park, Wigan on Saturday 10 November 1962, in front of a crowd of 13,588, and he played at centre in the 10-0 victory over Widnes in the Western Division Championship Final replay during the 1962–63 season on Wednesday 21 November 1962.

=== Club career ===
O'Neil signed for Workington Town on 18 August 1956, he was contracted on £9 for a victory (based on increases in average earnings, this would be approximately £509.30 in 2018), and £4 for a defeat, 5-weeks after signing he made his dêbut for Workington Town, he played at centre, as partner to Bill Wookey, in the 9-17 defeat by Salford in a 1956–57 Lancashire Cup first-round match during the 1956–57 season at The Willows, Salford on Saturday 1 September 1956, he scored 21-tries, and was Workington Town's top try-scorer, during the 1961–62 season, he played and scored three tries (hat-trick) in Workington Town's 29-7 victory over Wigan in the Western Division Championship semi-final during the 1962–63 season at Derwent Park, Workington on Monday 15 October 1962, he scored 24 tries from 40-matches during the 1962–63 season, he scored a speculative drop goal a few minutes from time in the victory over Swinton during the 1963–64 season at Station Road, Swinton, he played his last match for Workington Town in the 5-7 defeat by Hull Kingston Rovers in the 1965–66 Challenge Cup second-round match during the 1965–66 season at Derwent Park, Workington on Saturday 19 March 1966.

== Honours ==
John O'Neil is a Workington Town Hall Of Fame Inductee.
