= Solway Community School =

Location
- Liddell Street; Silloth; Wigton, Cumbria, CA7 4DD; England
- Coordinates: 54.8722°N 3.38434°W

Information
- Type: Community school
- Local authority: Cumberland Council
- Department for Education URN: 112377 Tables
- Ofsted: Reports
- Head Teacher: Tom Hailwood
- Gender: Mixed
- Age: 11 to 16
- Enrolment: 110 as of April 2022
- Capacity: 295
- Houses: Dalton, Franklin, Newton, Sharman
- Website: http://www.solway.cumbria.sch.uk/

Solway Community School is a mixed secondary school located in Silloth in the English county of Cumbria.

It is a comprehensive community school administered by Cumberland Council. Solway Community School offers GCSEs and vocational courses as programmes of study for pupils.

The school previously held specialist status as a Technology College, and was called Solway Community Technology College during this period.

== Notable former pupils ==
- John O'Neil, former rugby player
