= Holme Low =

Civil parish in Cumbria, England

Coordinates: 54.8460°N 3.3710°W

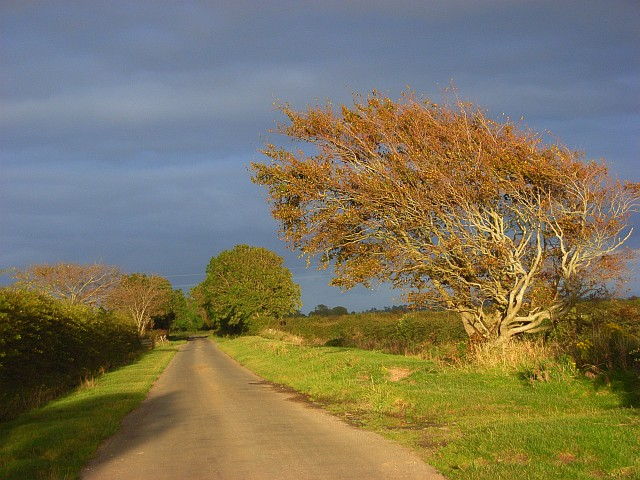
- Narrow lanes, like this one at Wolsty, connect the scattered, rural population of Holme Low.

- Location within Cumbria
- Population: 415 (Parish, 2021)
- Civil parish: Holme Low
- Unitary authority: Cumberland
- Ceremonial county: Cumbria
- Region: North West
- Country: England
- Sovereign state: United Kingdom
- Post town: Wigton
- Postcode district: CA7
- Police: Cumbria
- Fire: Cumbria
- Ambulance: North West
- UK Parliament: Penrith and Solway

Holme Low is a civil parish in the Cumberland district of Cumbria, England. The parish covers a largely rural area with no significant settlements. It lies 18 miles (29 km) west of Carlisle.

== Geography ==
The parish is entirely rural, and the population is scattered in small hamlets, including Barracks Bridge, Blackdyke, Blitterlees, Calvo, Causewayhead, Greenrow, Seaville, and Wolsty.

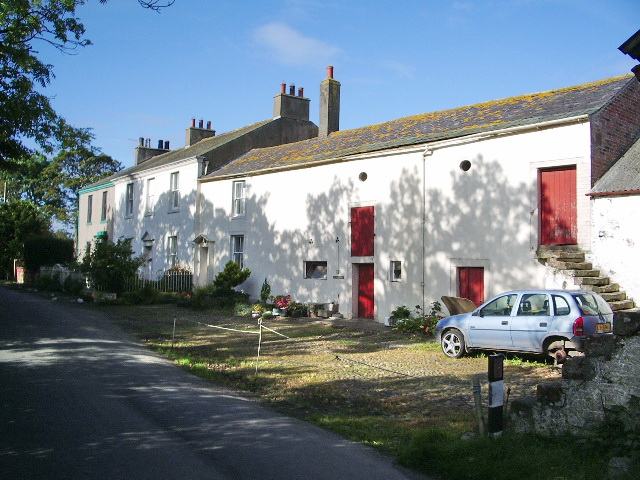
The hamlet of Causewayhead is in the civil parish of Holme Low.

It borders the parishes of Holme St Cuthbert and Holme Abbey to the south, Silloth-on-Solway to the north-west, and has a short stretch of coastline on the Solway Firth to the west. To the north, it is bordered by an unpopulated area known as Skinburness Marsh, which is common to the parishes of Holme St Cuthbert, Holme Low, and Holme Abbey.

== History ==
In Roman times, when the entire Solway coast was fortified to defend against incursions across the sea, a series of milefortlets were constructed beyond the western end of Hadrian's Wall. Remains of one of these have been discovered near Beckfoot, just beyond the parish's southern boundary. A Roman road also ran through the parish at that time.

In the early 14th century, a castle was built at Wolsty to defend Holme Cultram Abbey from attacks by Scots, who would frequently raid across the Solway. Not much remains of the castle today; it was already in a ruined state by 1572, and had been entirely demolished by the 18th century.

From 1862 until the Beeching Axe in the 1960s, the Carlisle and Silloth Bay railway line ran through Holme Low. Within the parish itself there was a single station, Blackdyke Halt, which closed with the rest of the line in the 1960s. In 1954, this line was the first in Britain to replace its steam locomotives with diesel ones, so for a short while, Holme Low was one of the only places in the country to see diesel-fuelled trains.

== Governance ==
There are two tiers of local government covering Holme Low, at civil parish and unitary authority level: Holme Low Parish Council and Cumberland Council. The parish council generally meets at the Community Hall in Silloth, outside the parish.

=== Administrative history ===
Holme Low was historically a township in the ancient parish of Holme Cultram, which had its parish church at Abbeytown. From the 17th century onwards, parishes were gradually given various civil functions under the poor laws, in addition to their original ecclesiastical functions. In some cases, including Holme Cultram, the civil functions were exercised by each township separately rather than the parish as a whole. In 1866, the legal definition of 'parish' was changed to be the areas used for administering the poor laws, and so Holme Low also became a civil parish.

The township or civil parish of Holme Low historically included Silloth within its boundaries. Silloth grew from a minor hamlet into a small town following the construction of new docks there in the 1850s.

The whole ancient parish of Holme Cultram was made a local government district in 1863. Such districts were reconstituted as urban districts under the Local Government Act 1894. Holme Cultram Urban District was abolished in 1934, and at the same time Silloth was removed from Holme Low to become a separate civil parish.

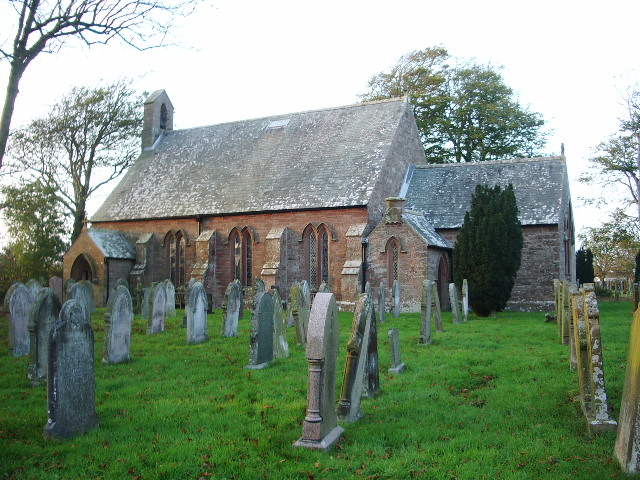
St Paul's Church, Causewayhead

In ecclesiastical terms, a chapel of ease dedicated to St Paul was built in 1845 at Caueswayhead. In 1849, it was given an ecclesiastical parish which covered part, but not all, of the Holme Low township.

== Population ==
At the 2021 census, the parish had a population of 415. The population had been 373 at the 2001 census, and 362 in 2011.

== Transport ==
There are bus services available in the parish, with several Silloth-bound routes passing through or close by. The number 60 from Silloth runs every two hours to Maryport along the B5300 coast road, and stops at Blitterlees, Beckfoot, Mawbray, and Allonby. The 38 runs to Carlisle via Abbeytown, and the 71 runs to Carlisle via Newton Arlosh and Kirkbride.

== See also ==
- Listed buildings in Holme Low
