= River Waver =

River in Cumbria, England

Coordinates: 54°52′N 3°17′W

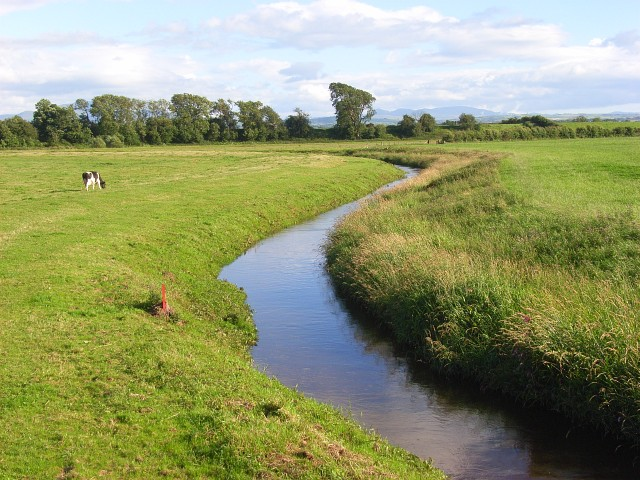
River Waver near Abbeytown

The River Waver is a river in Cumbria, England. The river rises at Wavergillhead (as Townthwaite Beck). It is fed by the northwards flowing Thornthwaite Beck and Pow Gill either side of Bolton Wood Lane. The "Little Waver", rising at Catlands Hill, joins at Waterside near Woodrow. The river then takes a northward course via Waverton and Waverbridge, both of which are named for the river, before turning sharply westward at Abbeytown. The river then goes north, running into Moricambe Bay, an inlet of the Solway Firth.
