= Milefortlet 13 =

Milefortlet of the Roman Cumbrian Coast defences

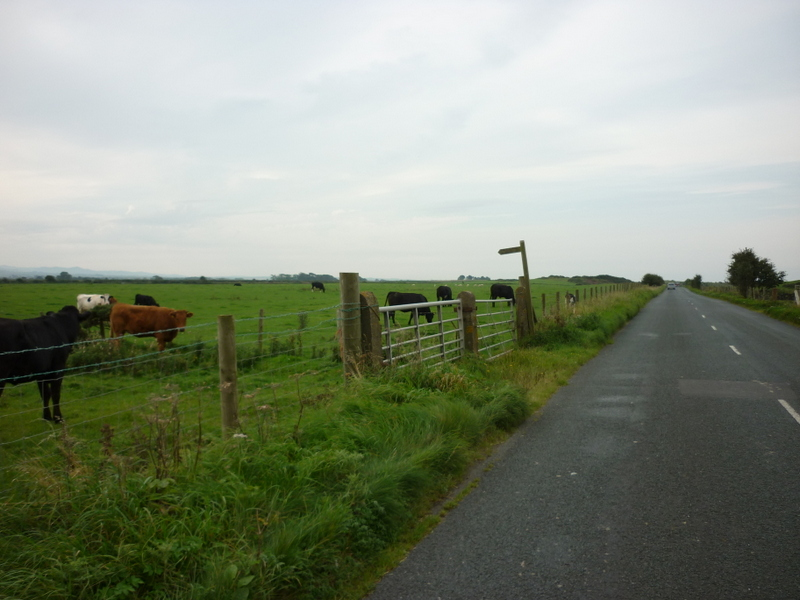
- Milefortlet 13 lies somewhere near the road between Blitterlees and Beckfoot

- Location within Cumbria
- 54.846625°N 3.403677°W
- Type: Milecastle
- Location: Cumbria, England

Milefortlet 13 was a Milefortlet of the Roman Cumbrian Coast defences. These milefortlets and intervening stone watchtowers extended from the western end of Hadrian's Wall, along the Cumbrian coast and were linked by a wooden palisade. They were contemporary with defensive structures on Hadrian's Wall. The exact location of Milefortlet 13 is unknown, although two of the nearby turrets (Towers 13A and 13B) have been located and excavated.

== Description ==
Milefortlet 13 was situated on the coast between the villages of Blitterlees and Beckfoot, in the civil parish of Holme Low. The milefortlet has never been located, but its approximate position has been calculated from the positions of other Roman fortlets. Exploratory excavations were conducted in 1954 without finding any remains. A geophysical survey was conducted in 1994 with inconclusive results. However, the geophysical survey did locate a possible fortlet ditch (grid reference NY10035110), and noted three parallel lines which might have been the ditches of the coastal defences.

== Associated Towers ==
Each milefortlet had two associated towers, similar in construction to the turrets built along Hadrian's Wall. These towers were positioned approximately one-third and two-thirds of a Roman mile to the west of the Milefortlet, and would probably have been manned by part of the nearest Milefortlet's garrison. The towers associated with Milefortlet 13 are known as Tower 13A (grid reference NY09825066) and Tower 13B (grid reference NY09655015).

The site of Tower 13A was identified by excavation in 1954. The foundations of the tower were found, and were 3.75 metres square internally. Pottery fragments were found, and a coin of Hadrian. The remains of a modern dike cross the site. The site of Tower 13B is located in a field on high ground, and was excavated in 1880. The foundations were found 6 metres square externally, and 3.75 metres square internally. A few sherds of pottery were found. The 1880 excavations also uncovered a possible Roman pavement located between Tower 13A and Tower 13B.
