= Waverton, Cumbria =

Village in Cumbria, England

Coordinates: 54.815°N 3.212°W

Waverton
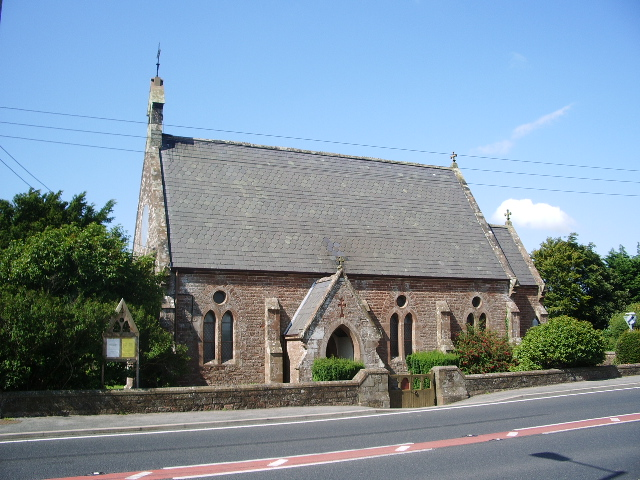
- Christ Church

- Location in Allerdale Location within Cumbria
- Population: 306 (2011)
- OS grid reference: NY2241547466
  - London: 321 mi (517 km)
- Civil parish: Waverton
- Unitary authority: Cumberland
- Ceremonial county: Cumbria
- Region: North West
- Country: England
- Sovereign state: United Kingdom
- Post town: WIGTON
- Postcode district: CA7
- Dialling code: 016973
- Police: Cumbria
- Fire: Cumbria
- Ambulance: North West
- UK Parliament: Penrith and Solway

Waverton is a linear village and civil parish in the Cumberland district of Cumbria, England. Waverton lies on the main A596 road east of a bridge over the River Waver, 2.2 miles south west from Wigton and 14.2 miles from the nearest city, Carlisle. The river is the reason for Waverton's name as well as it coming from the old English word tuǹ, this meaning "An enclosure; a farmstead; a village; an estate".

== Population ==
There were no major changes in the population of Waverton in the nineteenth century, when population first began to be collected in the Census. The population was slowly increasing each year, but only by a maximum of 30 people a year up till 1871. After 1871 the Census records show that there was a decrease in the population. This fluctuation was repeated as from 1910 there was a sharp increase, however this was followed by another population depletion just after the 1920. The population of Waverton began steadily increasing even through World War II and the continued increase in population could be explained by the baby boom in 1950 which impacted the population all over the UK.

As recorded in the 2001 Census, Waverton's population was 326, with 173 females and 153 males. reducing at the 2011 Census to a population of 306, with 151 females and 155 males.

== History ==
Waverton was originally a township in the Parish of Wigton; however it became a civil Parish soon after 1866. Its history is mainly focused around the agriculture industry and the Christ Church, located in what was previously known as the township.

Waverton's Church was built in 1865 and completed on 6 May. It was built in a Victorian Perpendicular High Church style as a chapel-of-ease. The Christ Church had the ability to accommodate 150 people, and was home to two stained glass windows. The window on the east of the building had in the centre the figure of Jesus, as well as St. Peter and St. Paul by his sides. The window on the west was circular, holding seven circular lights. Christ Church became the parish church for the newly formed Waverton-cum-Dundraw parish in 1902. St Patrick evangelised near the crossroads before moving on to Aspatria.

The church housed fittings from the former Dundraw Mission Church (which stopped being as a place of worship in 1965) including its altar, which was carved by the vicar of the day, and a baptismal font. A new war memorial (also from Dundraw) was installed in 2007.

The Christ Church was described as a "modest village church". It ran weekly regular services, with other events in between such as book sales, pancake day and bank holidays services being a few of them. There was also the Harvest Festival and Plough Sunday had been created to celebrate the mainly agricultural community environment. The church stopped being a place of worship in the early 2020’s, was sold in 2023 and is currently being converted into a private dwelling.

== Industry ==
The 1801 Census showed Waverton as divided into two main forms of employment:

- Agriculture
- Trade Manufacturing or Hand Craft

Throughout the 1800s it was clear that Waverton's industry was mainly dominated by agriculture. In the 1881 Census it was estimated that over 90% of all males had an occupation in agriculture, with the second largest occupation being dealers in various mineral substances. The majority of women, on the other hand, in the 1881 Census were shown not to have a specific occupation, mainly staying at home to look after their children and carry out domestic activities. However a small percentage were employed in domestic services or offices.

== Climate ==
The nearest weather station to is Carlisle which is 14.2 miles north-east from Waverton. The warmest months on average in Waverton are July and August with the highest temperatures being at an average of 19 degrees.

Climate data for Waverton, Cumbria
Month	Jan	Feb	Mar	Apr	May	Jun	Jul	Aug	Sep	Oct	Nov	Dec	Year
Mean daily maximum °C (°F)	6 (43)	7 (45)	9 (48)	11 (52)	15 (59)	17 (63)	19 (66)	19 (66)	16 (61)	13 (55)	9 (48)	7 (45)	12 (54)
Mean daily minimum °C (°F)	2 (36)	2 (36)	3 (37)	4 (39)	6 (43)	9 (48)	12 (54)	11 (52)	9 (48)	7 (45)	4 (39)	2 (36)	6 (43)
Average precipitation cm (inches)	9.39 (3.70)	8.09 (3.19)	7.33 (2.89)	5.41 (2.13)	5.62 (2.21)	6.38 (2.51)	6.14 (2.42)	7.15 (2.81)	8.32 (3.28)	11.09 (4.37)	9.85 (3.88)	10.47 (4.12)	95.24 (37.51)
Source: Bing.com

== See also ==
- Listed buildings in Waverton, Cumbria
