= Markus Campbell-Savours =

British politician (born 1981)

The Honourable Markus Campbell-Savours MP
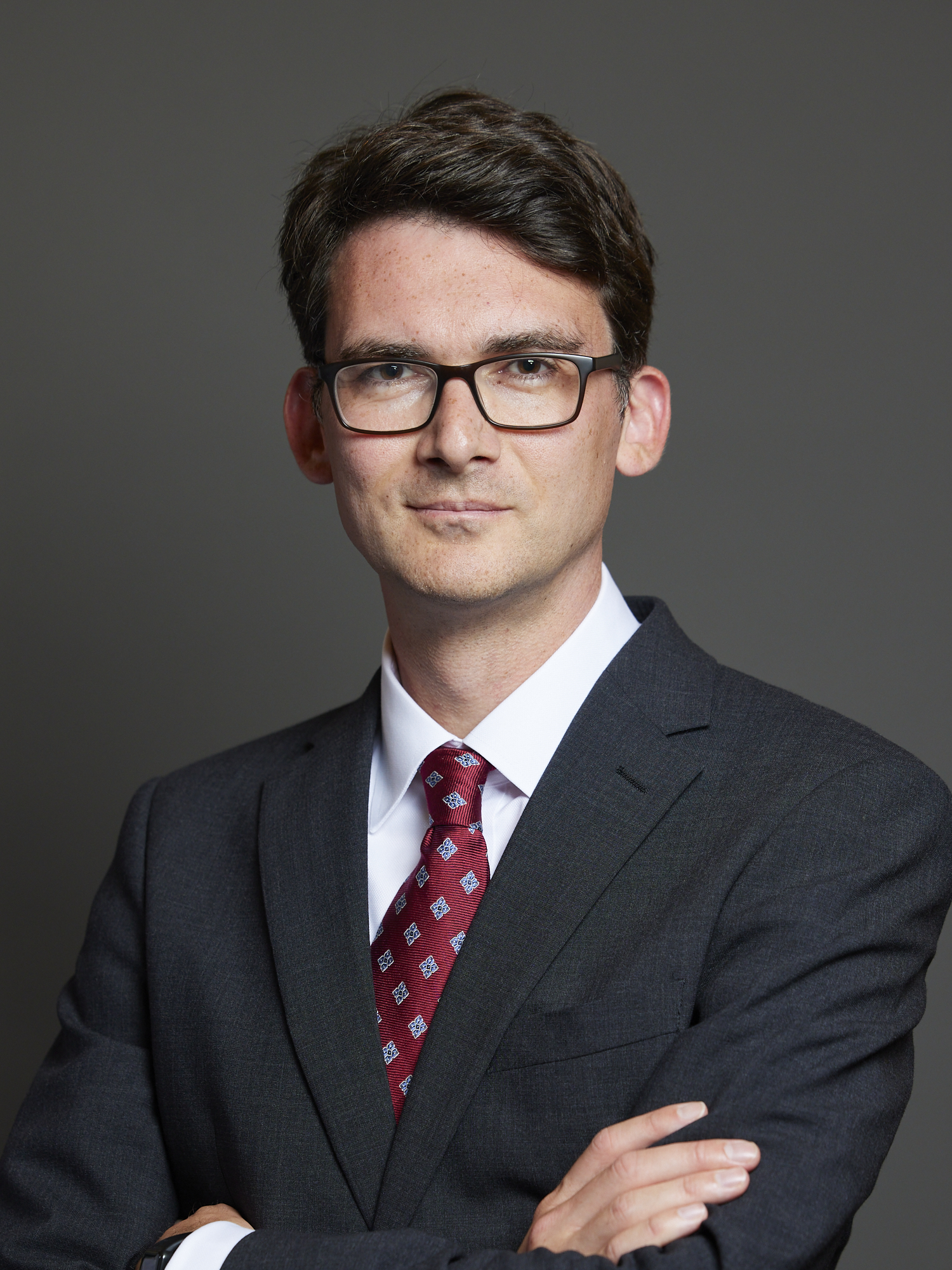
- Official portrait, 2024

Member of Parliament for Penrith and Solway
- Incumbent
- Assumed office 4 July 2024
- Preceded by: Constituency established
- Majority: 5,257 (10.7%)

Personal details
- Born: Markus Dale Campbell-Savours; January 1981 (age 45) Whitehaven, Cumbria, England
- Party: Labour (Since 2003)
- Children: 2
- Parent: Dale Campbell-Savours (father)
- Education: Birkbeck, University of London

Markus Dale Campbell-Savours (born January 1981) is a British Labour Party politician who has been the Member of Parliament for Penrith and Solway since 2024. He had the whip suspended from the Labour Party in December 2025 for voting against plans to extend the inheritance tax to farmers; the whip was restored in March 2026.

== Early life and education ==
Campbell-Savours is the son of peer Lord Campbell-Savours of Allerdale and his Icelandic wife Guðrún Kristín Runólfsdóttir, from Reykjavík. His father was the MP for Workington from 1979 to 2001, and currently sits in the House of Lords. He is the first British MP of Icelandic descent.

Campbell-Savours is an alumnus of Birkbeck, University of London. He previously worked for Gen2 Engineering and Technology Training Ltd, and as an electrician and electrical contracts manager.

== Political career ==
Campbell-Savours was a candidate in Churchill ward at the 2010 Westminster City Council election.

In the 20 June 2019 Keswick Town Council elections, Campbell-Savours was elected for East Ward. In the 2019 Allerdale Borough Council election, Campbell-Savours was elected for Keswick.

=== Parliament ===
Campbell-Savours was elected Member of Parliament for Penrith and Solway in the 2024 general election.

In his acceptance speech, Campbell-Savours said that he was acutely aware that many of the voters who placed their trust in him had voted Labour for the first time, and promised to be "a voice for the entire community," to "ensure that Penrith and Solway is listened to," and to do his best to "bring back compassion".

In December 2024, he spoke out against government plans to impose inheritance tax on agricultural land in Parliament, indicating that he would be engaging with DEFRA and the Treasury to seek important amendments to ensure that the consequences of closing this tax loophole do not unintentionally affect working farmers in his constituency, which has more farmers than any other in the country.

On 3 December 2025, he was suspended from the Parliamentary Labour Party for voting against the government plans to tax inherited agricultural land. He had the whip restored on 6 March 2026.

Campbell-Savours was critical of Keir Starmer’s leadership of the Labour Party. He later called on Starmer to resign following the 2026 United Kingdom local elections.

== Personal life ==
Campbell-Savours is married and has two children.

Parliament of the United Kingdom
New constituency	Member of Parliament for Penrith and Solway; 2024–present	Incumbent
