= Blitterlees =

Hamlet in Cumbria, England

Coordinates: 54.858°N 3.387°W

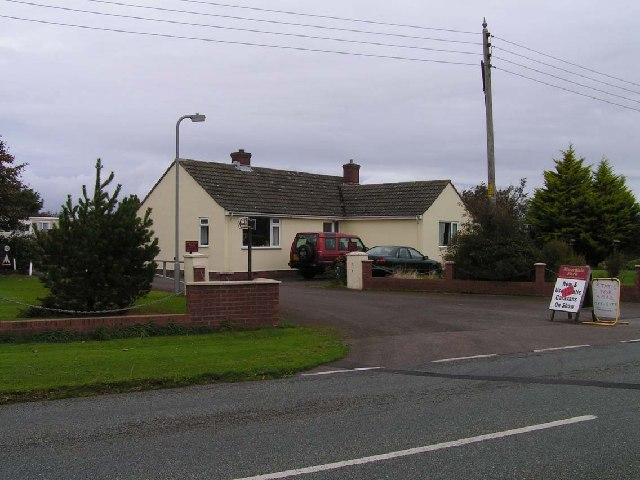
- Moordale Caravan park in Blitterlees. The road in the foreground is the B5300 coast road.

- Location in Allerdale, Cumbria Location within Cumbria
- OS grid reference: NY109523
- Civil parish: Holme Low
- Unitary authority: Cumberland
- Ceremonial county: Cumbria
- Region: North West
- Country: England
- Sovereign state: United Kingdom
- Post town: SILLOTH
- Postcode district: CA7
- Dialling code: 016973
- Police: Cumbria
- Fire: Cumbria
- Ambulance: North West
- UK Parliament: Penrith and Solway

Blitterlees is a hamlet in the parish of Holme Low, one mile south of Silloth in Cumbria, England. The hamlet of Wolsty is located approximately 1 mile (1.6 km) to the south as the crow flies, or 2.25 miles (3.62 km) by road, and Cumbria's county town, Carlisle, is located 23 miles (37 km) to the east. The B5300, known locally as the "coast road", runs through the village on its way to Beckfoot, Mawbray, Allonby, and ultimately Maryport.

== History and toponymy ==
The name "Blitterlees" comes from the Old English blaecфorn-læs, meaning a blackthorn pasture. Previous variant spellings include Bletterliese, Bletherleese, and Bladderlies.

During the Roman period, the coast around present-day Blitterlees was fortified, as a series of milefortlets were built along the Solway plain, extending beyond the western end of Hadrian's Wall. The closest milefortlet to the settlement was milefortlet 12, which was originally constructed of earth and timber.

In the 19th century, the name was spelled Blitter Lees, with a space between the two words. It was described as containing several farmhouses and being located three-quarters of a mile away from Silloth railway station. The station was the terminus of the Carlisle and Silloth Bay railway, a single-track line which opened in 1856 and closed with the Beeching Axe in 1965. Within Holme Low, the parish which contains Blitterlees, there was a single station on the line, Blackdyke Halt, in the hamlet of Blackdyke, a mile-and-a-half to the east.

== The hamlet today ==
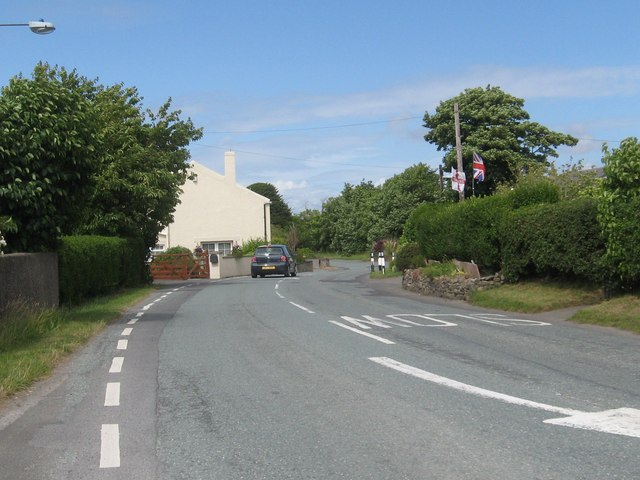
The B5300 coast road in Blitterlees.

Blitterlees is home to two caravan parks, as Silloth and the Solway coast in general are popular with tourists. The Solway Coast is also an Area of Outstanding Natural Beauty, although Blitterlees falls outside of the boundaries, in between the northern and southern sections. There is a golf course in the hamlet, and the B5300 coast road runs through the settlement. There is a local bus service which calls at Blitterlees approximately once every two hours in either direction, heading north to Silloth or southbound to Maryport via Mawbray, Beckfoot, and Allonby. To the south of Blitterlees, just north of the hamlet of Beckfoot, is Bank Mill Nurseries, a garden centre with a restaurant, play area, and animal sanctuary. The nearest shops are a mile away in Silloth, and the nearest railway station is at Aspatria, eight-and-a-quarter miles to the south-east.
