= Abbeytown =

Village and civil parish in Cumbria, England

Coordinates: 54.8447°N 3.2877°W

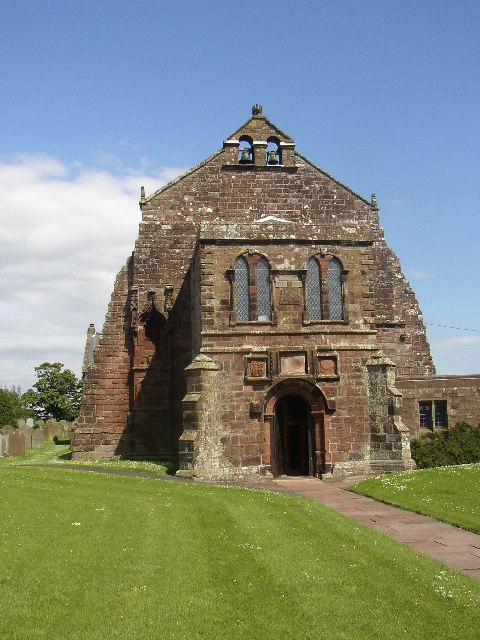
- Holmcultram Abbey

- Location within Cumbria
- Population: 757 (Holme Abbey parish, 2021)
- OS grid reference: NY173507
- Civil parish: Holme Abbey
- Unitary authority: Cumberland
- Ceremonial county: Cumbria
- Region: North West
- Country: England
- Sovereign state: United Kingdom
- Post town: WIGTON
- Postcode district: CA7
- Dialling code: 016973
- Police: Cumbria
- Fire: Cumbria
- Ambulance: North West
- UK Parliament: Penrith and Solway

Abbeytown is the main village in the civil parish of Holme Abbey in the Cumberland district of Cumbria, England. The parish was historically called Holme Cultram. The modern names of Abbeytown and Holme Abbey both reference Holmcultram Abbey, which was founded in 1150 and dissolved in 1538; the surviving nave from the abbey now serves as the parish church. The parish of Holme Abbey had a population of 757 at the 2021 census.

== Toponymy ==
The parish was historically called Holme Cultram. It gave its name to the Cistercian abbey founded there in 1150. The name Abbeytown is recorded from at least the 17th century (The Towne of the Abbey, Abbey Towne; Abbeytown from mid-18th century) and references it being the village where the abbey was located.

The official name of the civil parish today is Holme Abbey, whereas the Royal Mail uses Abbeytown in postal addresses.

== Geography ==
It is located five-and-a-half miles south-east of Silloth, and six-and-a-half miles north-west of Wigton. The civil parish borders Holme Low to the north, Holme East Waver and Dundraw to the east, Bromfield to the south, and Holme St Cuthbert to the west. An area known as Skinburness Marsh to the north is common to the parishes of Holme St Cuthbert, Holme Abbey, and Holme Low. The county town of Carlisle is eighteen miles to the north-east. Other nearby settlements include Foulsyke, Highlaws, Kelsick, Mawbray, Pelutho, and Wheyrigg. The B5302 road runs through the village.

The village is located on the edge of the Solway Coast Area of Outstanding Natural Beauty and the Cumbria Coastal Way passes through the village.

The village also has a recreational field, which regularly hosts football matches from around the Allerdale district. The recreational field was constructed in 2012, with the demolition of the former standing structural foundation making way for a new field. A designated area within this field houses the children's play park. As of 2015 Abbeytown Archers have set up their club at the recreational field, and outdoor shooting takes place on Monday evenings, with indoor shooting held in the Holm Cultram C of E school, also on Mondays. The village is located on the main Wigton to Silloth road and has a pub and a shop.

== History ==
Historically a part of Cumberland, Abbeytown was built around the former Cistercian Holmcultram Abbey, the nave of the church of which now serves the parish as St Mary's Church. On 9 June 2006 the church was set alight in an arson attack which devastated its roof parts of which had been in situ since it was erected 900 years ago. The church has since been restored, and fully reopened in September 2015.

Abbey Town railway station opened in 1856 on the Carlisle and Silloth Bay Railway. It closed with the line in 1964.

Many buildings in the village date from the medieval period, especially those associated with the former abbey. Others are Victorian, when much of the village was concerned with the railway line to Silloth, and, more recently, a large number of houses were built at "Friars Garth".

== Governance ==
There are two tiers of local government covering Holme Abbey, at civil parish and unitary authority level: Holme Abbey Parish Council and Cumberland Council. The parish council generally meets at the sports pavilion in Abbeytown. Abbeytown is part of the parliamentary constituency of Penrith and Solway, which has been represented by Markus Campbell-Savours of the Labour Party since the 2024 general election.

=== Administrative history ===
Holme Cultram was an ancient parish in the historic county of Cumberland. The parish was subdivided into four townships: Holme Abbey, Holme East Waver, Holme Low, and Holme St Cuthbert, with the parish church and village of Abbeytown being in the Holme Abbey township. The parish also included an area of marshland adjoining the Solway Firth known as Skinburness Marsh, which was deemed to be common to the three townships of Holme Abbey, Holme Low, and Holme St Cuthbert.

From the 17th century onwards, parishes were gradually given various civil functions under the poor laws, in addition to their original ecclesiastical functions. In some cases, including Holme Cultram, the civil functions were exercised by each township separately rather than the parish as a whole. In 1866, the legal definition of 'parish' was changed to be the areas used for administering the poor laws, and so the four townships also became civil parishes.

Meanwhile, the whole ancient parish of Holme Cultram was made a local government district in 1863. Such districts were reconstituted as urban districts under the Local Government Act 1894. Silloth, a new town which had been laid out from the 1850s around a new harbour, was the largest settlement in the urban district, but the council met at Abbeytown.

Holme Cultram Urban District was abolished in 1934. The civil parish of Holme Abbey was then given a parish council and classed as a rural parish within the Wigton Rural District between 1934 and 1974.

Wigton Rural District was abolished in 1974, and Holme Abbey became part of the borough of Allerdale in the new county of Cumbria. Allerdale was in turn abolished in 2023 when the new Cumberland Council was created, also taking over the functions of the abolished Cumbria County Council in the area.

== Demography ==
In the 1841 census there were 868 inhabitants. At the 2021 census, the population of Holme Abbey parish was 757. The population in 2011 was 819.

== Nuclear disposal site ==
In June 2012, it became clear that the Solway Plain between Silloth, Abbeytown and Westnewton has been identified as a potential site for a Geological Disposal Facility for the UK's high level nuclear waste. Two other sites have also been identified – Eskdale and Ennerdale – both of these are within the Lake District National Park. The Solway Plain was not named by the Managing Radioactive Waste Safely (MRWS) Partnership, rather they referred to the 'Low permeability sedimentary rocks associated with the Mercia Mudstone Group (MMG)'. This was in (publicly available) document 285 of the West Cumbria MRWS in a report written by Dr Dearlove, the consultant geologist recruited by MRWS. In 2013, Cumbria County Council withdrew from the MRWS process. Though Allerdale Borough Council and Copeland Borough Council wished to proceed, the Department of Energy and Climate Change closed the site selection process in west Cumbria.

== Sports ==
The opening stage of the Tour of Britain Women's cycle race passed through Abbeytown in 2026.

== See also ==
- Listed buildings in Holme Abbey
