= Listed buildings in Holme Low =

Holme Low is a civil parish in the Cumberland district in Cumbria, England. It contains eight listed buildings that are recorded in the National Heritage List for England. All the listed buildings are designated at Grade II, the lowest of the three grades, which is applied to "buildings of national importance and special interest." The parish contains small settlements and is otherwise rural. The listed buildings are houses with associated structures, or farmhouses and farm buildings, and a war memorial.

== Buildings ==
Name and location	Photograph	Date	Notes
Blackdyke Farmhouse and barns 54.86041°N 3.33379°W	—	Mid or late 18th century	The farmhouse is stuccoed with a green slate roof, and has two storeys and two bays, with a two-bay extension to the right. The windows are sashes, and the main doorway has pilasters, an entablature and a pediment. In the extension is a door with an architrave. The barns are in brick with a Welsh slate roof, they have an L-shaped plan, and contain a cart entrance, doorways and loft doors.
Whinclose and barn 54.87520°N 3.31933°W	—	1770	The farmhouse is stuccoed on a plinth, and has quoins and a green slate roof. There are two storeys and three bays, and a lower one-bay extension to the right. The doorway has an architrave, with a shall hood and a dated and inscribed finial. The windows are sashes, those in the main part having architraves. The barn to the left is in cobbles with a Welsh slate roof, it has a single storey, and there is a rendered extension. The barn contains doorways and a loft door.
Causeway Farmhouse and barns 54.86089°N 3.37129°W		Late 18th century	The farmhouse is stuccoed on a chamfered plinth, with pilastered quoins, a cornice, and a slate roof. There are two storeys and three bays, and contain sash windows. The doorway has reeded pilasters, a triglyph entablature and a pediment. The attached outbuildings to the right contain a doorway with an open pediment, sash windows, other doorways, loft doors, and a flight of external stone steps.
Seaville Farmhouse; 54.86752°N 3.31738°W	—	Late 18th or early 19th century	The farmhouse is in channelled ashlar on a plinth, with sandstone quoins and a green slate roof. There are two storeys and three bays. The doorway has a sandstone architrave with a cornice and pediment, and the windows are sashes in architraves.
Garden wall and railings, Causeway Farmhouse; 54.86081°N 3.37130°W	—	Early 19th century	The low stone wall has chamfered coping. The railings and the gate are in cast iron with spear-heads.
Barn, Dixon's Cottage; 54.86847°N 3.31572°W	—	Early 19th century	The barn is in mixed cobbles and sandstone rubble, and it has a green slate roof. There is one storey and a loft. On the north side is a cart entrance, and there is a doorway on the south; on both sides are ventilation slits. To the east is a lean-to stone extension.
War memorial 54.86708°N 3.35564°W		1920	The war memorial is in the churchyard of St Paul's Church, Causewayhead, and is in Portland stone. It consists of a wheel-head cross about 3 metres (9.8 ft) tall on a low tapering plinth. There is an HIS Christogram on the centre of the cross head, knotwork carving on the front of the head and shaft of the cross, and on the lower part of the shaft is a bronze plaque with an inscription and the names of those lost in the First World War.
