= Silloth =

Port town in Cumbria, England

Coordinates: 54.869°N 3.381°W

Silloth: Silloth-on-Solway
- Town and parish
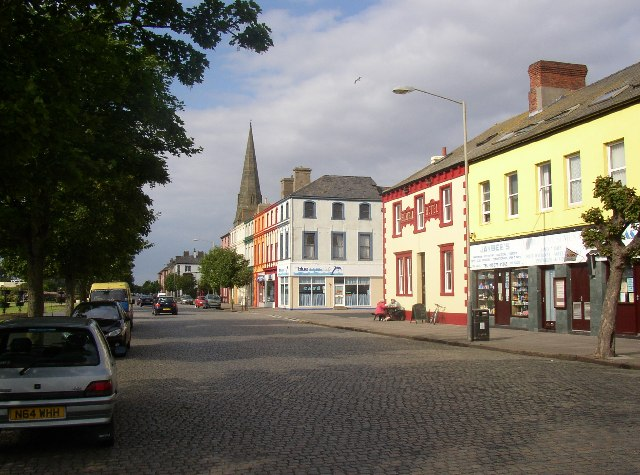
- Criffel Street, Silloth

- Location within Cumbria
- Population: 2,749 (Parish, 2021)
- OS grid reference: NY113536
- Civil parish: Silloth-on-Solway
- Unitary authority: Cumberland
- Ceremonial county: Cumbria
- Region: North West
- Country: England
- Sovereign state: United Kingdom
- Post town: WIGTON
- Postcode district: CA7
- Dialling code: 016973
- Police: Cumbria
- Fire: Cumbria
- Ambulance: North West
- UK Parliament: Penrith and Solway

Silloth, or Silloth-on-Solway, is a port town and civil parish in the Cumberland district of Cumbria, England. The town stands on the coast of the Solway Firth, 18 miles (29 km) west of Carlisle. It was developed from the 1850s onwards around a new harbour, and also became a small seaside resort. At the 2021 census, the parish had a population of 2,749.

== Toponymy ==
'Silloth' means "'sea barn(s)', v. 'sǣ hlaða'." (The first word is Old English, the second is Old Norse).

Today, the town is known both as Silloth and Silloth-on-Solway. The official name of the parish is Silloth-on-Solway, whereas the Royal Mail uses just Silloth in postal addresses.

== History ==
Silloth was only a small hamlet until the mid-19th century. The modern town owes its existence to new docks and a railway which were both built in the 1850s. Port Carlisle had been the main port for Carlisle, but its harbour was silting up and it was difficult for ships to reach at low tides. Silloth was chosen as a suitable location for a new harbour. The Carlisle and Silloth Bay Railway was therefore built, opening to Silloth railway station in 1856, and the new harbour was built shortly afterwards. The town was laid out to provide homes for the workers on the railway and at the port, but from early on it also became a minor seaside resort.

The town offered workers from the factories of Carlisle access to the seaside, and the town flourished, particularly as a destination for day trippers. The town's popularity as a resort peaked in the late 19th and early 20th centuries.

RAF Silloth was an airfield on the eastern side of the town. It opened in June 1939, just before the start of the Second World War, and closed on 31 December 1960. Originally designed to be used by RAF Maintenance Command, 22MU, the airfield was handed over to Coastal Command during November 1939. No 1 Operational Training Unit (OTU) was then responsible for training pilots and crews from the UK and Allied Countries. Therefore, the aerodrome had twin responsibilities, the maintenance and repair of planes for use in the war effort and the training of crews from allied countries to fly planes.

== Governance ==
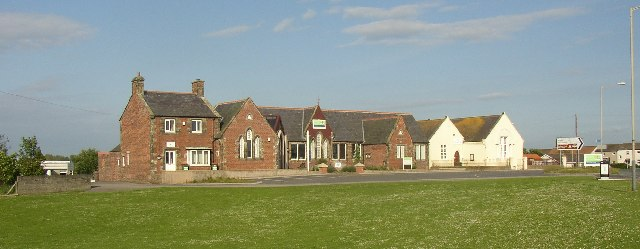
Solway Coast Discovery Centre and Silloth Community Hall

There are two tiers of local government covering Silloth, at parish and unitary authority level: Silloth-on-Solway Town Council and Cumberland Council. The town council meets at the community hall on Petteril Street.

Silloth is part of the parliamentary constituency of Penrith and Solway, which has been represented by Markus Campbell-Savours of the Labour Party since the 2024 General Election.

=== Administrative history ===
Silloth was historically part of the ancient parish of Holme Cultram in the historic county of Cumberland. Holme Cultram's parish church was at Abbeytown, 4 miles (6 km) south-east of Silloth. The parish was subdivided into four townships; Silloth was in the Holme Low township. From the 17th century onwards, parishes were gradually given various civil functions under the poor laws, in addition to their original ecclesiastical functions. In some cases, including Holme Cultram, the civil functions were exercised by each township separately rather than the parish as a whole. In 1866, the legal definition of 'parish' was changed to be the areas used for administering the poor laws, and so Holme Low also became a separate civil parish.

Meanwhile, the whole ancient parish of Holme Cultram was made a local government district in 1863. Such districts were reconstituted as urban districts under the Local Government Act 1894. Although Silloth was the largest settlement in the urban district, the council met at Abbeytown.

Holme Cultram Urban District was abolished in 1934, and at the same time a new civil parish of Silloth was created from part of the civil parish of Holme Low. Silloth was then given a parish council and classed as a rural parish within the Wigton Rural District between 1934 and 1974.

Wigton Rural District was abolished in 1974, and Silloth became part of the borough of Allerdale in the new county of Cumbria. The parish of Silloth was formally renamed Silloth-on-Solway in 1980.

Allerdale was abolished in 2023 when the new Cumberland Council was created, also taking over the functions of the abolished Cumbria County Council in the area.

== Demography ==
At the 2021 census, the parish had a population of 2,749. The population had been 2,932 at the 2001 census, and 2,906 at the 2011 census.

== Churches ==
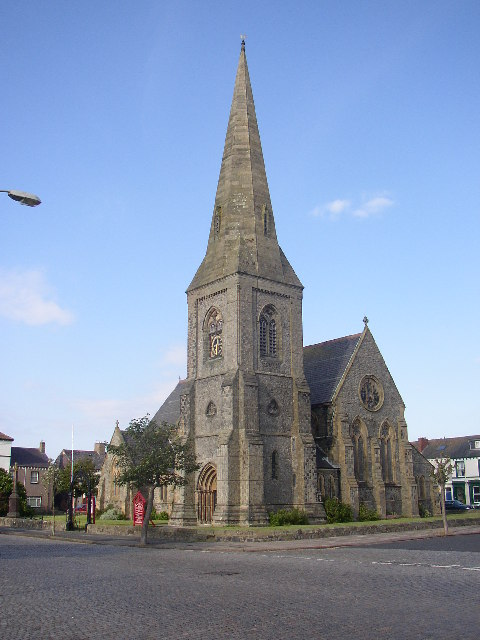
Christ Church, Silloth, occupies a complete rectangle of the planned town

Silloth's largest church is Christ Church, situated in a complete rectangular plot which was planned into the original town design. It is on a commanding site at Criffel Street and the body of the church was completed in 1870. The porch tower and large broach spire were completed later in 1878, and house a ring of 8 bells which are chimed. It was designed by Carlisle architect Charles John Ferguson in the Gothic style, and is built with an interesting mix of local sandstone, and granite which was brought by the North British Railway (and boats) from Newry, now in Northern Ireland. Much of the interior is faced with yellow brick trimmed with red.

There are several churches and chapels of other denominations in the town.

== Industry ==
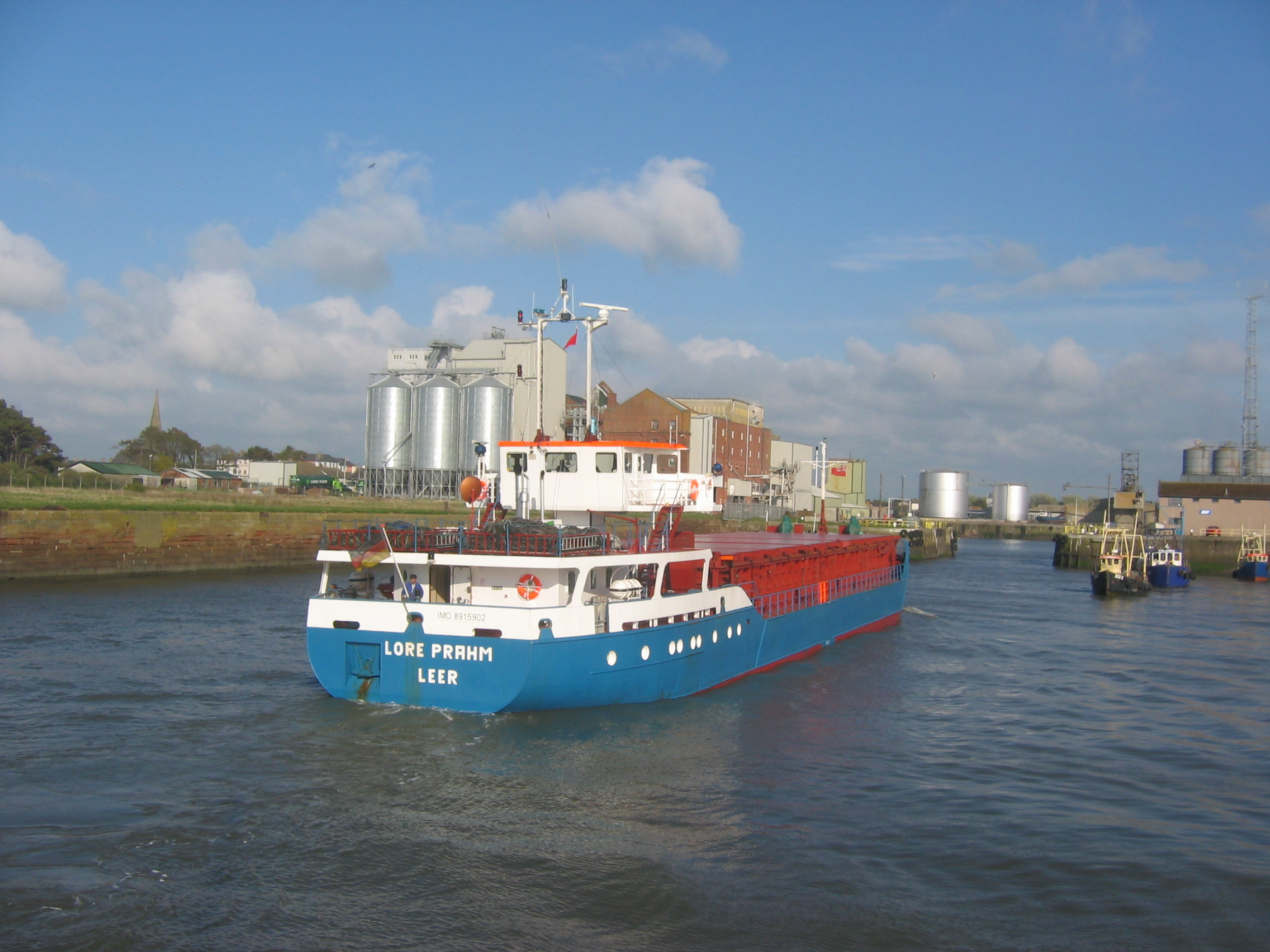
Silloth docks 2008

=== Port of Silloth ===
The Port of Silloth is owned and operated by Associated British Ports. The main cargoes are wheat, fertiliser, molasses, forest products and general cargo.

=== Carr's Flour Mill ===
An example of a Victorian flour mill, the building was constructed adjacent to the New Dock in 1887. Carr's flour mill is an operating mill which supplies flour to a number of food manufacturers such as United Biscuits, Warburtons and several other leading bakeries and confectioners. Carr's Flour Mill is now owned by Whitworths.

=== Cheri Foam ===
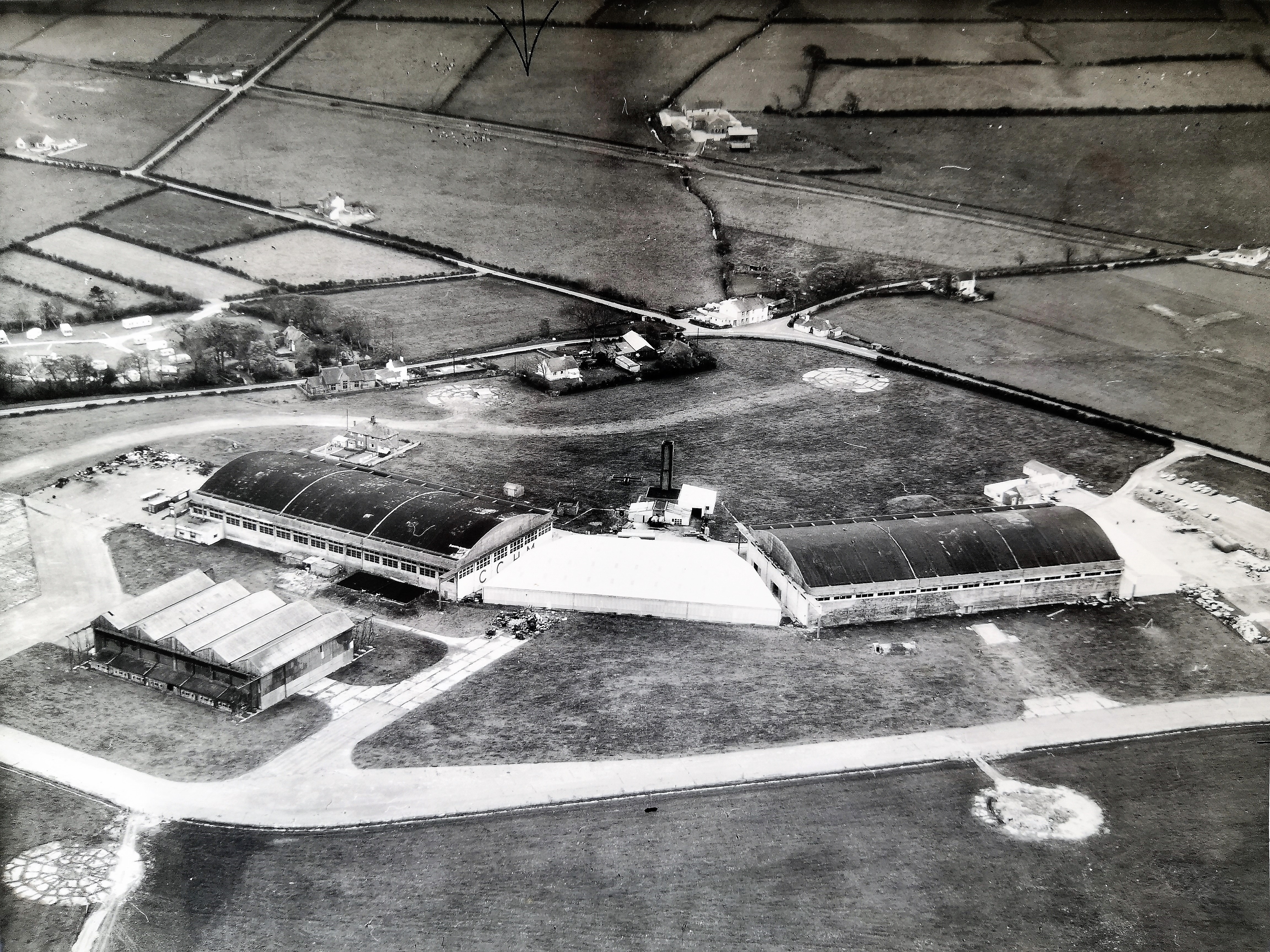
Silloth Airfield factory

In the 1960s two businesses that had outgrown their factory in Whitehaven re-located to Silloth airfield. They were Cumberland Curled Hair and Cheri Foam. They were one of the largest employers in the area until the late 1970s. Cheri Foam, was owned by Kurt Oppenheim, who had established his business originally in Whitehaven in 1946. He bought two of the hangars on the airfield and later joined them together to create large factory space and storage units for the manufacture of polyurethane foam blocks. This was an industrial chemical process and a foam block conversion unit ('Conversion' means that the blocks were cut up into shapes like cushions and sheets to be supplied to the furniture, bedding and motor industries). In 1973 an additional factory unit was added to house the production of foam moulded car parts by high pressure injection foam machines. Machinery equipment in the factory was largely manufactured by a team of Silloth metal fitters and local electricians employed full time by the factory. There was a laboratory and a fibreglass mould making unit on site as well as a garaging unit to service the fourteen container vans that the company used to ship its production all over the UK. It was a twenty four hours a day operation with production leaving the works at all hours. The logo Cheri Foam on the sides of vans was very familiar in the area. About a hundred and fifty people worked in this factory, some from Silloth and many bussed in from Maryport and surrounds each day. The business was acquired by the Beaver Group in 1976 and Oppenheim retired to join his family in London. The main customer Times Furnishing eventually closed and after this the business ran down and eventually closed.

=== Other ===
Local contractor D.A. Harrison are based in Silloth, employing 200 people.

== Tourism ==
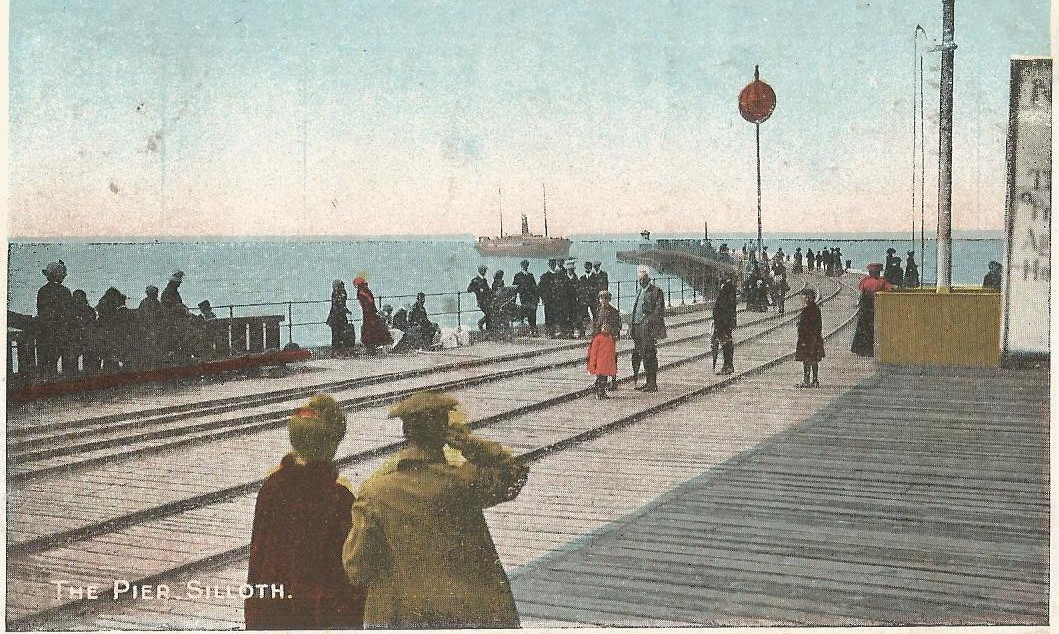
Silloth has long been a popular tourist destination.

Tourism is a major contributor to the economy in Silloth, with dozens of large and small static and touring caravan parks located within a ten-mile (15-kilometre) radius of the town centre, resulting in a large increase in the population during the summer months.

Silloth hosts several small annual events held on the town green. These include a beer festival held in September, plus a steam rally, kite and food festivals.

Amenities include a golf course.

== Transport ==
The railway to Silloth opened in 1856. The line passed through the villages of Kirkbride and Abbeytown to Carlisle. The railway carried both passengers and freight from the port, and tourists visiting the town. Silloth railway station was closed as part of the Beeching cuts in 1964.

Buses are run by Stagecoach.

Silloth is on the B5302 road, which leads to the A596 and the town of Wigton, and the B5300 which connects the town to Maryport.

== Sports ==
=== Silloth A.F.C. ===
Silloth A.F.C. (also known as the Silloth Seagulls) is an amateur football club currently competing in the Cumberland County League. The club features a range of teams, including a men's squad and a thriving junior section for both boys and girls, providing opportunities for players of all ages to develop and compete.

In 2025, Kian Orchard was appointed as Head Coach, bringing fresh ideas, strong leadership, and a new vision to the club.

The Seagulls play their home matches at Eden Street Playing Fields, a ground they have called home since 1954. In 2022, the club announced plans to construct a new clubhouse to support the expansion of its junior programs. This development aims to enhance facilities for both existing members and the wider community.

=== Cycling ===
The opening stage of the Tour of Britain Women's cycle race passed through Silloth in 2026.

== Media ==
A local 'free' newspaper published monthly entitled The Solway Buzz, distributed to households in the area by a team of volunteers, covers news and events in Silloth and the surrounding area. The town is also served by the regional newspaper the News & Star.

Local TV coverage is provided by BBC North East and Cumbria and ITV Border. Television signals are received from the Caldbeck TV transmitter.

Local radio stations are BBC Radio Cumbria, Greatest Hits Radio Cumbria & South West Scotland and Solway Radio, a community based radio station.

== Notable people ==
- Jim Brough, a dual-code international rugby player, was born in Silloth in 1903.
- Cecil Leitch, golfer, was born in Silloth in 1891.
- Kathleen Ferrier, a contralto singer.

== See also ==
- Listed buildings in Silloth-on-Solway
- Solway Community School

== Sources ==
- Barker, Oswald J. (August 2010). Smith, Martin (ed.). "Branch line to Silloth". Railway Bylines. 15 (9). Radstock: Irwell Press Limited. ISSN 1360-2098.
- Alan Taylor. Cheri Foam factory story.
