= Penrith and Solway =

UK Parliament constituency (since 2024)

- County constituency for the House of Commons
- Interactive map of boundaries since 2024
- Location within North West England
- County: Cumbria
- Electorate: 76,720 (March 2020)
- Major settlements: Alston, Cockermouth, Keswick, Maryport, Penrith, Wigton

Current constituency
- Created: 2024
- Member of Parliament: Markus Campbell-Savours (Labour)
- Seats: One
- Created from: Penrith and The Border, Workington, Copeland & Carlisle

Penrith and Solway is a constituency of the House of Commons in the UK Parliament Further to the completion of the 2023 review of Westminster constituencies, it was contested for the first time at the 2024 general election, since when it has been represented by Markus Campbell-Savours of the Labour Party.

The constituency is named for the Cumbrian market town of Penrith and the Solway Coast.

== Constituency profile ==
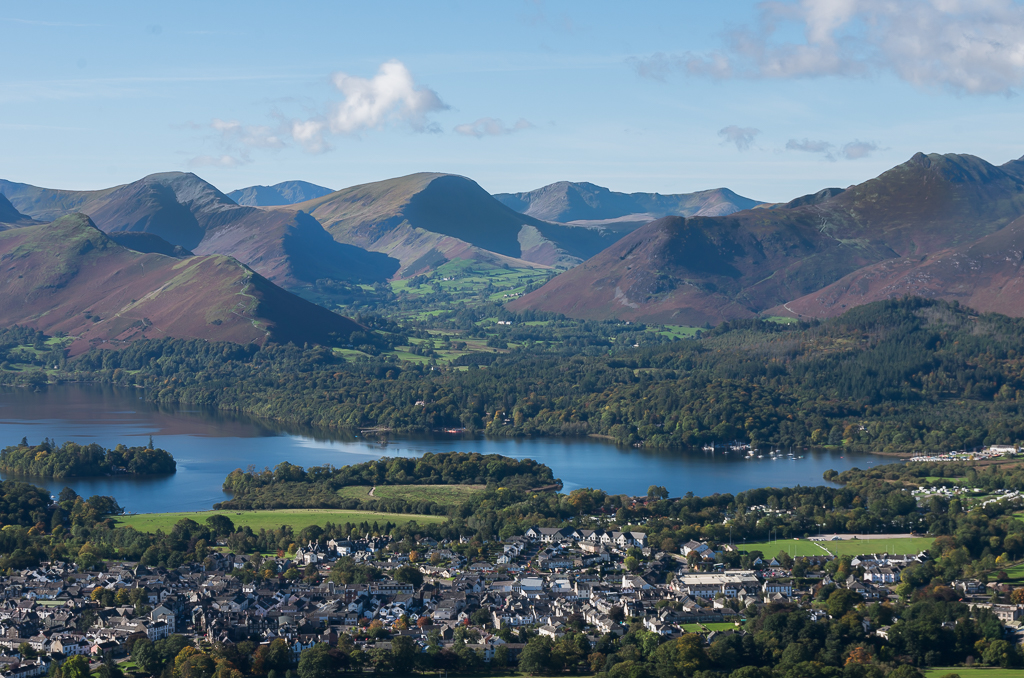
Keswick, Derwentwater and the mountains of the Lake District

Penrith and Solway is a constituency in Cumbria in North West England. It is named after its largest town, Penrith, which has a population of around 18,000, and the Solway Firth which separates England and Scotland. Other settlements include the towns of Keswick, Aspatria, Alston, Cockermouth, Maryport, Silloth and Wigton.

Penrith and Solway is a large, rural constituency, mostly characterised by rolling fields with many small towns and villages. There are two main upland areas; Keswick in the south-west is located within the mountainous Lake District National Park, an area known for its tourism and association with literature, and Alston in the east lies high in the North Pennines National Landscape and has a history of metal and coal mining. Maryport, Aspatria and their nearby villages also have a coal mining heritage.

Maryport and Silloth were traditionally important Irish Sea ports for the export of local coal and manufactured goods from the nearby city of Carlisle. Penrith is a historic market town which grew from agricultural trade and is popular with tourists due to its location close to the highland areas. Most of the constituency's towns, villages and rural areas have average levels of wealth. There is some deprivation in the former coal mining district around Maryport, whilst Cockermouth is an affluent market town. House prices across the constituency are generally higher than the rest of North West England but lower than the UK average.

Penrith and Solway has a large population of older adults and retirees and a low proportion of young adults. Residents have average levels of income, high rates of homeownership, and the child poverty rate is below average. They are generally religious, have average levels of education, and a high proportion work in the agriculture, tourism and manufacturing industries. White people made up 98% of the population at the 2021 census.

At the local council level, the western towns of Maryport, Wigton, Cockermouth and Keswick are represented by Labour Party councillors, Penrith by Liberal Democrats and the rural villages mostly by Conservatives. An estimated 56% of voters in Penrith and Solway supported leaving the European Union in the 2016 referendum, higher than the UK-wide figure of 52%.

== Boundaries ==
The 2023 boundary review was carried out using the local authority structure as it existed in Cumbria on 1 December 2020 and is officially defined as:

- The Borough of Allerdale wards of: All Saints; Allhallow & Waverton; Aspatria; Boltons; Broughton St. Bridgets; Christchurch; Crummock & Derwent Valley; Ellen & Gilcrux; Keswick; Marsh & Warmpool; Maryport North; Maryport South; Silloth & Solway Coast; Warnell; Wigton & Woodside.
- The City of Carlisle ward of Dalston & Burgh.
- The District of Eden wards of: Alston Moor; Hartside; Hesket; Kirkoswald; Langwathby; Lazonby; Penrith Carleton; Penrith East; Penrith North; Penrith Pategill; Penrith South; Penrith West; Skelton.

With effect from 1 April 2023, the second tier councils in Cumbria were abolished and replaced by the new unitary authorities of Cumberland, and Westmorland and Furness. Consequently, the constituency now comprises the following from the 2024 general election:

- The Cumberland wards of: Aspatria; Bothel and Wharrels; Cockermouth North; Cockermouth South (majority); Dalston and Burgh (most); Dearham and Broughton; Keswick; Maryport North; Maryport South (majority); Solway Coast; Thursby; Wetheral (part); Wigton.
- The Westmorland and Furness wards of: Alston and Fellside; Hesket and Lazonby; Penrith North; Penrith South.

The seat is centred around Penrith, stretching from Alston in the North Pennines to Maryport on the Solway Firth, and includes the following communities:

- Penrith, Alston and Wigton, formerly in the abolished constituency of Penrith and The Border
- Maryport, Cockermouth and Aspatria, formerly in the abolished constituency of Workington
- Keswick, transferred from Copeland (renamed Whitehaven and Workington)
- Dalston, transferred from Carlisle

== Members of Parliament ==
Election	Member	Party
2024	Markus Campbell-Savours	Labour
2025	Markus Campbell-Savours	Independent
2026	Markus Campbell-Savours	Labour

== Election results ==
=== Elections in the 2020s ===
General election 2024: Penrith and Solway
Party	Candidate	Votes	%	±%
Labour	Markus Campbell-Savours	19,986	40.6	+10.5
Conservative	Mark Jenkinson	14,729	29.9	−24.9
Reform	Matthew Moody	7,624	15.5	+13.7
Liberal Democrats	Julia Aglionby	4,742	9.6	+1.4
Green	Susan Denham-Smith	1,730	3.5	+0.4
Independent	Chris Johnston	195	0.4	N/A
SDP	Shaun Long	156	0.3	N/A
Independent	Roy Ivinson	119	0.2	N/A
Majority		5,257	10.7	
Turnout		49,281	63.2	
Labour win (new seat)				
