= Cadwaladr Bryner Jones =

British agriculturalist (1872–1954)

Sir Cadwaladr Bryner Jones CB CBE FHAS (6 April 1872 – 10 December 1954) was a Welsh agricultural educator and civil servant. He was educated at Dolgellau Grammar School, Aspatria Agricultural College and Durham University, where he received his MSc degree.

== Aspatria Agricultural College ==
Bryner Jones attended the Aspatria Agricultural College, Cumberland, between the years 1892–93 under the tutorship of Henry J. Webb. In 1892, the Science and Art Department, South Kensington awarded him a Second Class Advanced Certificate in Agriculture and a certificate in Chemistry and Botany. In the internal examinations he finished overall second to William Wilson gaining first prize for general agriculture, first prize for veterinary science, first prize for geology, certificates of honour for botany and land surveying, physiology and dairying, and a silver medal for best essay.

In his final year he finished sixth place in the examination of the Royal Agricultural Society and was awarded a first-class certificate and life membership of the society. However at the examination of the Highland and Agricultural Society of Scotland he finished in first place and received a diploma and life membership.

In summer 1907, the college principal invited Bryner Jones, MSc, then Professor of Agriculture at the University of Aberystwyth, to award the annual prizes. During his short speech the past scholar reminded the audience of the effects of the college's decision sixteen years earlier to embark upon a diploma course. He stated that Aspatria, with a tally board of 86 diplomas, had secured more than the total of the remaining institutions in the North of England.

== Career ==
=== Pre-1914 ===
After leaving Aspatria in 1893, Bryner Jones became assistant lecturer at U.C.N.W., Bangor, responsible for the external workings of agriculture in North Wales. In 1899, he became lecturer at Armstrong (now King's) College, Newcastle upon Tyne.

In 1890, the University College of Wales, Aberystwyth, set up a department of agriculture, modelled on Bangor, which included practical farming in its curriculum. When the department fell into disarray on the departure of the first lecturer in 1907, the college appointed Bryner Jones to a new chair of Agriculture. From that moment the department, together with the college farm, of which he was director, flourished and he became the leader of agricultural education in Wales.

After 1912, an arrangement was made whereby the development of two official schemes covering agricultural education and livestock improvement was entrusted to an Agricultural Commissioner, advised by an Agricultural Council for Wales. Bryner Jones became both commissioner and chairman of the Council, while retaining the position of Professor of Agriculture. Bryner Jones now became a figure of immense influence in the agricultural development of Wales and became involved in virtually every movement to promote its interests, including the development of the Royal Welsh Agricultural Society, the establishment of the Plant Breeding Station, the Welsh Journal of Agriculture and the University's Department of Agricultural Economics. The outbreak of the World War I in 1914 dictated a change of emphasis, and Bryner Jones became increasingly involved in the work of the food production department.

=== Inter-war years ===
When, in 1919, the Board of Agriculture was integrated into the Ministry of Agriculture and Fisheries, it set up a Welsh department at Aberystwyth, with Bryner Jones, as the first Welsh Secretary to the Ministry of Agriculture. For the next twenty years he presided over a department which grew slowly as the ministry's work expanded. The ministry held responsibility for agricultural education and advisory work at all levels together with livestock improvement. One result of this policy and of the Secretary's leadership became evident during World War II. The all-important County War Agricultural Executive Committees in Wales were able to enlist a band of experienced farmers and technical officers in the vital task of increasing food production. He was President of the Aberystwyth Old Students' Association in 1929–30.

=== Post-war ===
Bryner Jones remained active until his death. After the strenuous war years from 1939 to 1944, when he officially retired, he continued to act as the Minister's liaison officer and was chairman of the Montgomeryshire committee until 1947. From 1948 to 1953 he was deputy chairman of the newly formed Agricultural Land Commission for England and Wales and was chairman of the Welsh Agricultural Land Sub-commission. During this period the Sub-committee conducted a far-reaching survey of farming conditions in mid-Wales. The results were published in 1955 in The Mid-Wales Investigation Report. He managed and began to rehabilitate the Glan Llyn section of the Wynnstay estate after its transfer in part settlement of death duties.

BrynerJones was engaged in a wide range of agricultural and civil related activities. He was president of the Welsh Mountain Sheep Flock Book Society from 1913 to 1919, while his keen interest in Welsh black cattle was recognised by his election to the Society's presidency in 1944–45. Another institution which owed a great debt to him was the Royal Welsh Agricultural Show. He acted as honorary director, 1908–10, was chairman of its council from 1944 to 1953, and became its president in 1954. His other lifelong interests were Dr Williams School, Dolgellau, to which he gave generous service for 25 years as chairman of the governors, and U.C.W., Aberystwyth. He was a member of the college council from 1920 until his death.

He did much to ensure that the Welsh Plant Breeding Station, with George Stapledon as first director and Professor of Agricultural Botany, came to Aberystwyth. In recognition of his services to higher education the University of Wales awarded him the honorary degree of LL.D. in 1938. He was appointed a CBE in 1920, CB in 1936, and a knighthood in 1947.

== Death ==
Never married, Bryner Jones died on 10 December 1954 and was buried at Brithdir, where his grandfather Cadwaladr Jones (1783-1867) had been Congregational minister. In 1957, the Royal Welsh Agricultural Society inaugurated its prestigious Sir Bryner Jones Memorial Trophy, an annual award for outstanding achievement in a nominated sector of agriculture in Wales.

== Publications ==
- Livestock of the Farm (6 volumes) The Gresham Publishing Company London 1918
- Egwyddorion gwrteithio, Jarvis & Foster, London 1907
- Welsh Home-Spun Studies of Rural Wales, written in conjunction with Alun R. Roberts, Welsh Outlook Press 1930

He was a contributor to the Welsh Journal of Agriculture, first published in 1925, on behalf of the Welsh Agricultural Education Conference, of which he was chairman.

== Bibliography ==
- Edward Lewis Eliss (1972). The University College of Wales Aberystwyth, 1872–1972. Aberystwyth: University of Wales Press.
- A. W. Ashby; I. L. Evans (1944). The Agriculture of Wales and Monmouthshire, 1943. Cardiff: Honourable Society of Cymmrodorion / Press Board University of Wales.
- Sir John Winnifrith (1962). The Ministry of Agriculture Fisheries and Food. London: Allen & Unwin.

Professional and academic associations
Preceded by Sir E. John Russell	President of the Aberystwyth Old Students' Association; 1929–30	Succeeded by Dr William King
