= William Wilson (English academic) =

English physicist (1875–1965)

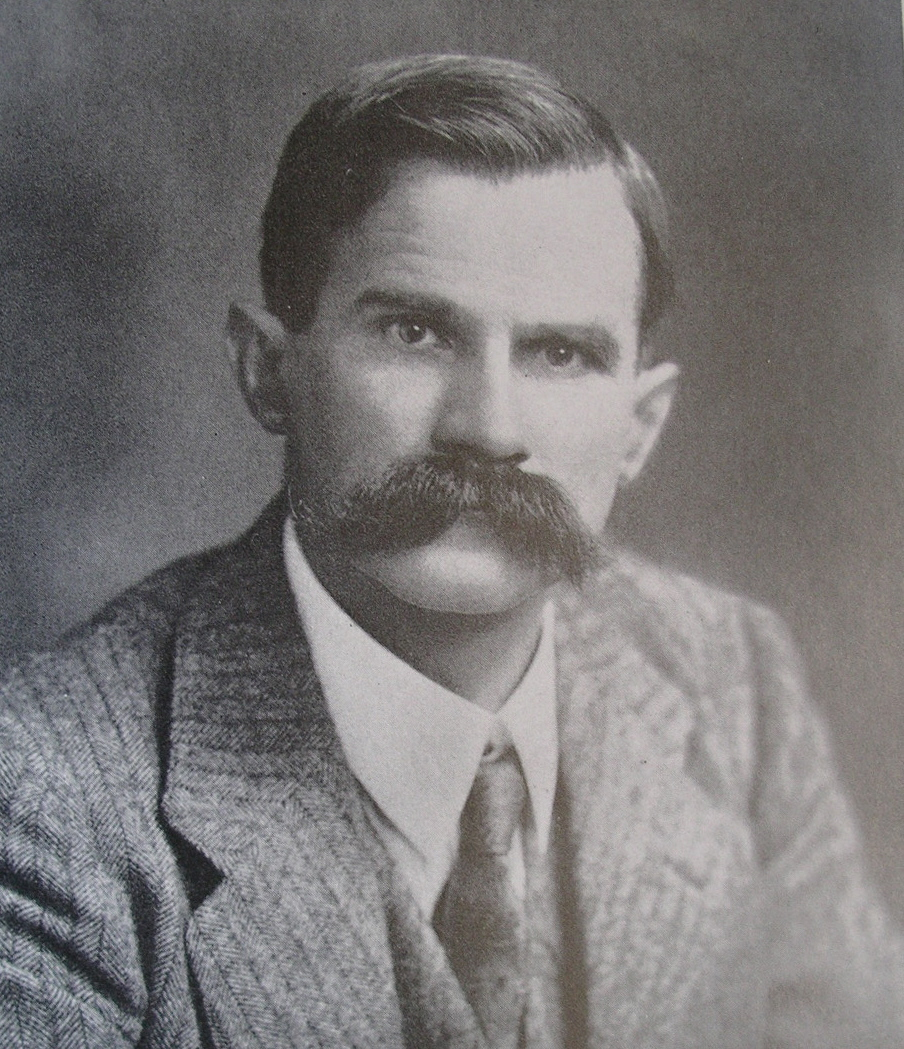
- William Wilson
- Born: 1 March 1875; Goodyhills, Cumberland
- Died: 14 October 1965 (aged 90)
- Education: Aspatria Agricultural College
- Known for: Bohr–Sommerfeld model
- Awards: Fellow of the Royal Society
- Scientific career
- Workplaces: King's College London; Bedford College, London

William Wilson FRS FHAS (1 March 1875 – 14 October 1965) was a leading figure in English academic circles. He was born at Goodyhills, in the Abbey Holme district of Cumberland in 1875. He was educated at the village school at Holme St Cuthbert, Cumberland, before attending the Aspatria Agricultural College, Aspatria, Cumberland.

== Early years ==
William Wilson was born at Goodyhills, in the Abbey Holme district of Cumberland in 1875; the eldest of eleven children to be born to William Osmotherley Wilson and his wife Isabella. William had taken his middle name from his grandmother who was a member of a prominent Quaker family which could trace their ancestry back to Ranulph de Osmundwerlaw and Agnes de Langrigg in the thirteenth century. He began his education at the village school at Holme St Cuthbert, Cumberland, where he excelled. On the recommendation of the master John Routlege he entered and gained a £25 Lancake scholarship, allowing him to attend the Aspatria Agricultural College, Aspatria, Cumberland, at the age of fourteen.

== Aspatria agricultural college ==
Wilson attended the Aspatria Agricultural College between the years 1891–93 under the tutorship of Henry J. Webb. In 1891 the Science and Art Department, South Kensington awarded him a Second Class Advanced Certificate in botany, mechanics, physiology, advanced chemistry model drawing and mathematics. In 1892 at the examination of the Royal Highland and Agricultural Society of Scotland he was awarded a Diploma and Life membership of the society. In the college internal examinations he gained First prizes for chemistry, mathematics and animal philosophy; Certificates of honour for physiology, botany and zoology; for which he won the Principals prize for gaining the highest aggregate marks in these examinations. In his final year he finished ninth place in the examination of the Royal Agricultural Society and was awarded a first class certificate and life membership of the society. Wilson left Aspatria in the summer of 1893 having gained a scholarship to the value of £80 at the Royal College of Science, South Kensington where he studied agriculture and agricultural chemistry.

== Working career ==
Wilson left Aspatria in the summer of 1893 having gained a scholarship to the value of £80 at the Royal College of Science, South Kensington where he studied agriculture and agricultural chemistry but also studied mathematics privately. Between the years 1896 and 1898 he taught at a school in Towcester, Northamptonshire. In 1898 he became Master of Mathematics at Beccles College, Suffolk, and Craven College, Highgate, London. He was determined to extend his understanding of mathematics and learned German, which enabled him to teach at the Berlitz Language Schools, Elberfeld, Germany, and at branches of the school in Dortmund, Münster, Barmen and Cologne, between the years 1901 and 1902. In 1902 he enrolled as a student at Leipzig University, where he obtained a PhD for his research on the photoelectric effect. While studying in Germany he met his future wife, Rose Heathfield, whom he married in 1909. His teaching career started in 1906 following his return from Germany, when he became an assistant lecturer in the Wheatstone laboratory in King's College London. During the years spent at King's College, he developed his work and knowledge on the emission of photons from hot bodies. He also continued being interested in the theory of relativity and quantum theory. Thanks to his knowledge of generalised mechanics, he was able to appreciate the consequences of the postulates introduced by Niels Bohr in the quantum theory field. He also explained the atomic orbits of the electrons and, using a generalized version of Bohr quantization, he derived the formula for the eccentricity of an elliptic orbit. In 1917 he received a doctorate from London University. In 1919 he accepted the position of a readership in the Physics Department in King's College, while in 1921 he was appointed to the Hildred Carlile chair of physics at Bedford College where he ended his working career in 1944. He became a Fellow of the Royal Society, in 1923; a Fellow of King's College London; and a Professor Emeritus in 1944.

== Death ==
William Wilson died at his home in Hereford in 1965 where his son W.F.H.F. Wilson practised as a solicitor.

== Academic publications ==
William Wilson wrote a number of articles and papers and had at least 4 books published within his lifetime. Titles include:-

- A hundred years of physics, Gerald Duckworth and co, London 1950
- Theoretical Physics published in 3 volumes, Methuen and Co, London, 1931–1940
- The microphysical world, Methuen and Co, London, 1951
- Nuclear Physics (translated) Methuen and Co, London, 1953
