= Royal Highland Show =

Annual agricultural show in Scotland

Coordinates: 55°56′27.59″N 3°22′26.44″W

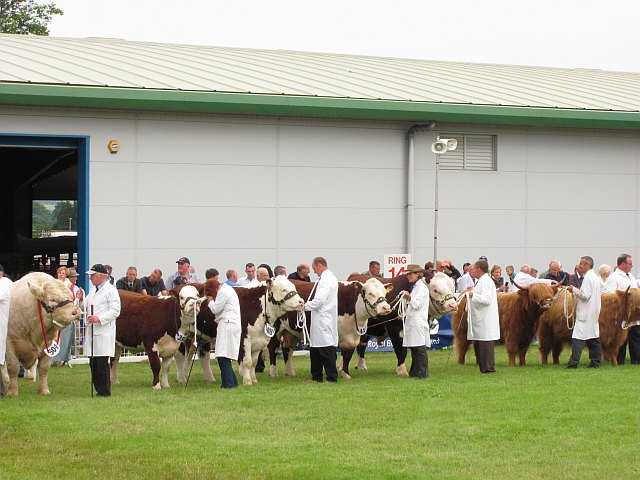
- Cattle judging at the Royal Highland Show, 2010
- Genre: Agriculture
- Begins: June
- Frequency: Annual
- Venue: Royal Highland Showground
- Locations: Ingliston, Edinburgh, Scotland
- Established: 1822; Canongate, Edinburgh, Scotland
- Next event: 19–22 June 2025
- Organiser: Royal Highland and Agricultural Society of Scotland
- Sponsor: Royal Bank of Scotland
- Website: www.royalhighlandshow.org

The Royal Highland Show is Scotland's biggest annual agricultural show. The show is organised by the Royal Highland and Agricultural Society of Scotland.

Held annually in June at the Royal Highland Centre in Ingliston, the event attracts over 1,000 exhibitors, 4,500 head of livestock, and up to 190,000 visitors. It is the premier fixture in Scotland's farming calendar and generates over £200 million in business. Exhibitors compete for the prestige of winning not only a prize ticket, but also for prize money and trophies worth over £1 million.

== History ==
The show first started in 1822, and was located at Edinburgh's Canongate on a site now occupied by the Scottish Parliament. From this point until 1959 the show moved around the towns and cities of Scotland, in one of the RHASS's eight electoral areas - Perth, Stirling, Strathclyde, Aberdeen, Lothian, Borders, Dumfries & Galloway and Highland. In 1960 the Ingliston site became the permanent home of the show, opening on 21 June 1960. The move to a permanent location has helped the show develop beyond its original remit, to become a celebration of Scottish food, countryside and its farming.

Originally the show operated Sunday to Wednesday, but this was later changed to Thursday to Sunday, over the second-last weekend in June, with Livestock competitions being held on the Thursday and Friday.

During the 1948 show held at Inverness, the Royal title was bestowed on the event by King George VI.

There was no show during 2001 because of an outbreak of foot and mouth disease.

In 2010 it reached the landmark anniversary of the 50th year of the show being held in Ingliston and also the 170th show to be staged. The 2010 event had almost 190,000 people attending, which makes it one of the most visited event in years. The 2014 drew in 8,000 more visitors compared to 2013 with a total of 178,659 people attending the event.

In 2015, the show celebrated its 175th event, with its biggest number of visitors of 188,449 visitors were recorded - almost 10,000 higher than last year and 805 more than the previous record attendance at Ingliston in 2010. The show also had visits from the Princess Royal, Nicola Sturgeon, and Richard Lochhead.

== Attractions ==
=== Livestock ===
A range of livestock is exhibited including sheep, cattle, goats, horses, ponies, donkeys, and poultry, with a total of 6000 animals in attendance.

One of the sights of the show is Heavy Horse Turnouts and for the first time ever, in 2006 Ingliston saw the attendance of all UK heavy horse breeds. Clydesdales, Shires, Percherons and — first time visitors to Scotland — two teams of Suffolk Punches travelling from Norfolk and Suffolk.

The show's most prestigious livestock honour, the Queen's Cup, rotates between the champions of the various types of livestock — in 2006 it was awarded to the best animal in the 162 strong goat section.

At the 2015 show there were:

- 20 breeds of 1,000 beef and dairy cattle
- 1,500 sheep
- 2,000 horses
- 100 goats
- More than 500 birds

=== Exhibition and trade ===
The Royal Highland Show is a showcase for Rural and Agricultural products and produce. There are large exhibits of agricultural machinery and supplies, equine supplies and outdoor sporting goods. A wide variety of rural, agricultural and environmental associations set up stall to promote themselves.

The Highland Showground's exhibition halls provide indoor spaces for a shopping arena and a food and drink arena. Both areas are dominated by Scottish producers, but there is a significant presence from other parts of the United Kingdom and form further afield; for instance European wine makers, German salami makers etc. The food and drink arena offers considerable opportunity for taste-testing and has a demonstration kitchen offering visitors suggestions on home to prepare and serve the products on offer. The shopping areas are extended into the main showground by market-style stalls. Other businesses, including banks, supermarkets and food producers have their own arenas to promote their commitment to farming, food production and agriculture.

=== Competition ===
Outside of the exhibition halls and livestock rings, there are a wide range of competitive and display events, including international sheep shearing, show jumping, driving, tug-of-war, dog obedience trials, forestry, falconry, farriery and other rural pursuits.

=== Music ===
Different bands and musical groups play at two bandstands; bands have included the band of HM Royal Marines and many pipe and drum bands. Typically over 50 different bands and musical groups, including school and rock bands, play at the Show.

== Visitors ==
Along with attracting up to 190,000 visitors annually, The Royal Highland Show has a history of attracting VIP visitors. Some more prominent names include:

- Queen Elizabeth II attended multiple times. The First time was in 1960 for the Official opening of the new Ingliston site, the second time was in 1984 for its 25th anniversary, again in 1992, with her final visit in 2009
- Queen Elizabeth The Queen Mother attended in 1954 and 1964.
- Anne, Princess Royal attended in 2008 and 2015.
- Prince Richard, Duke of Gloucester attended in 2006
- Mariann Fischer-Boel, ex-European Agriculture Commissioner

== Gallery ==
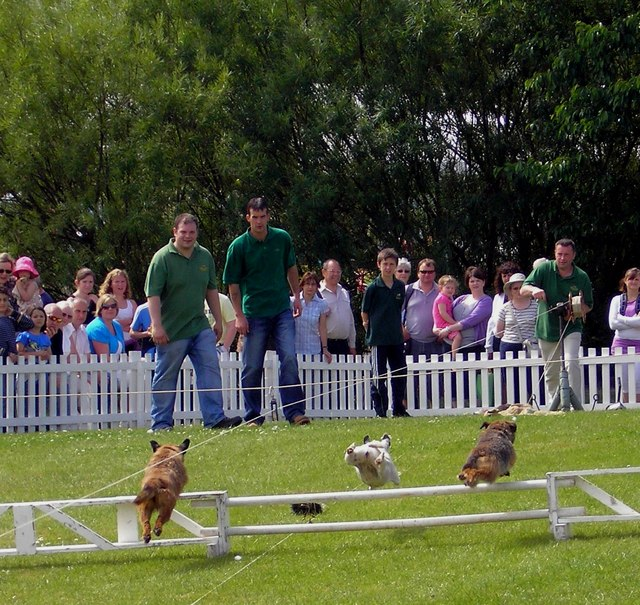
Terrier racing, Royal Highland Show

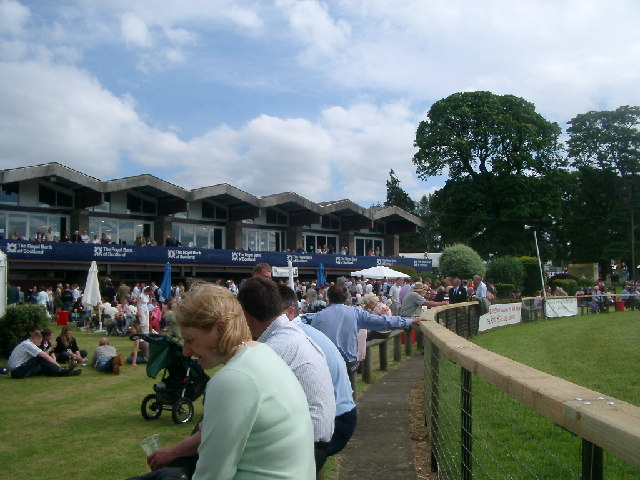
Macrobert Pavilion, Royal Highland Show

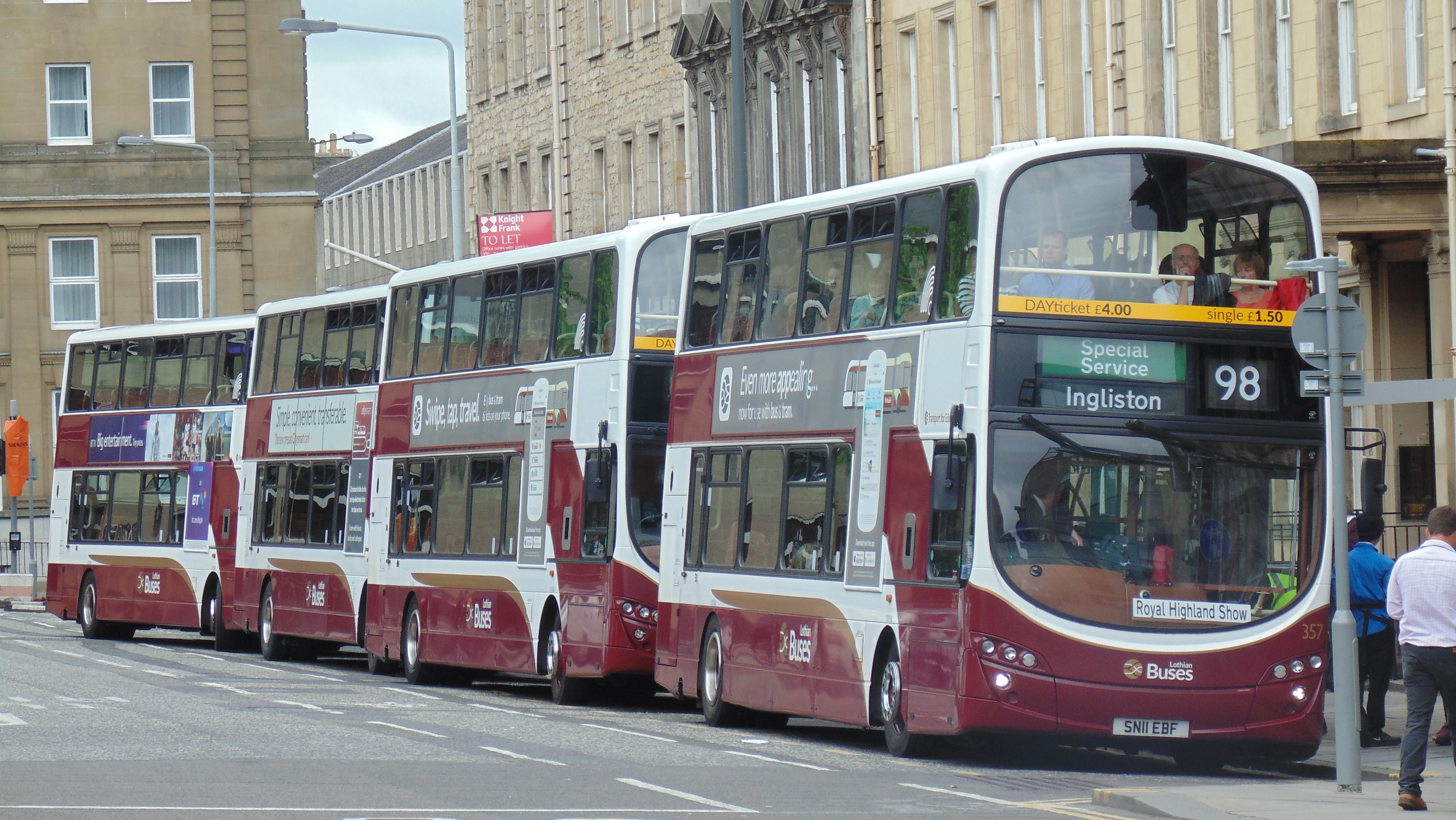
Lothian Buses for the Royal Highland Show, 20 June 2015

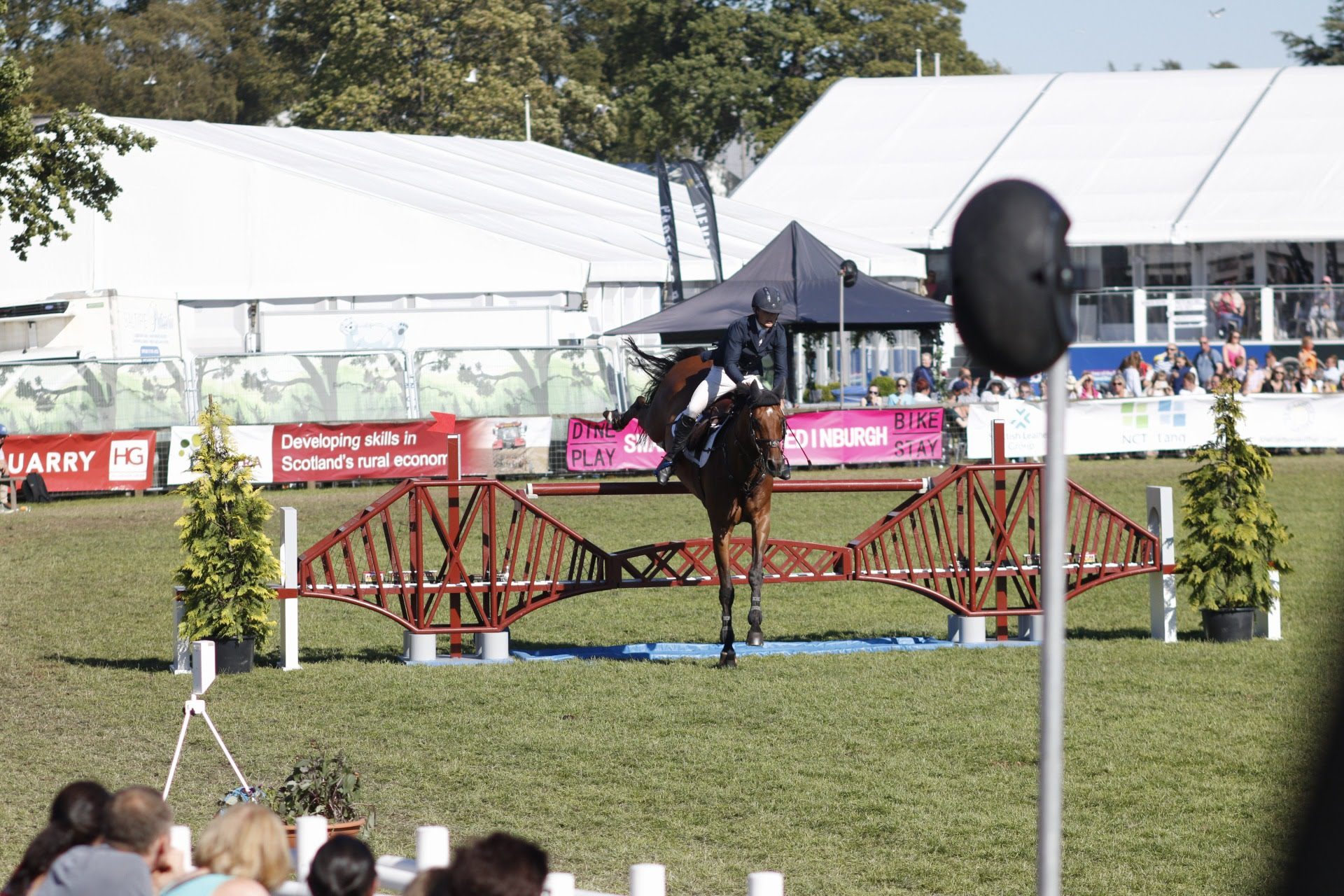
Jumping in the main ring at the Royal Highland Show 2018 over a jump in the shape of the Forth Rail Bridge.

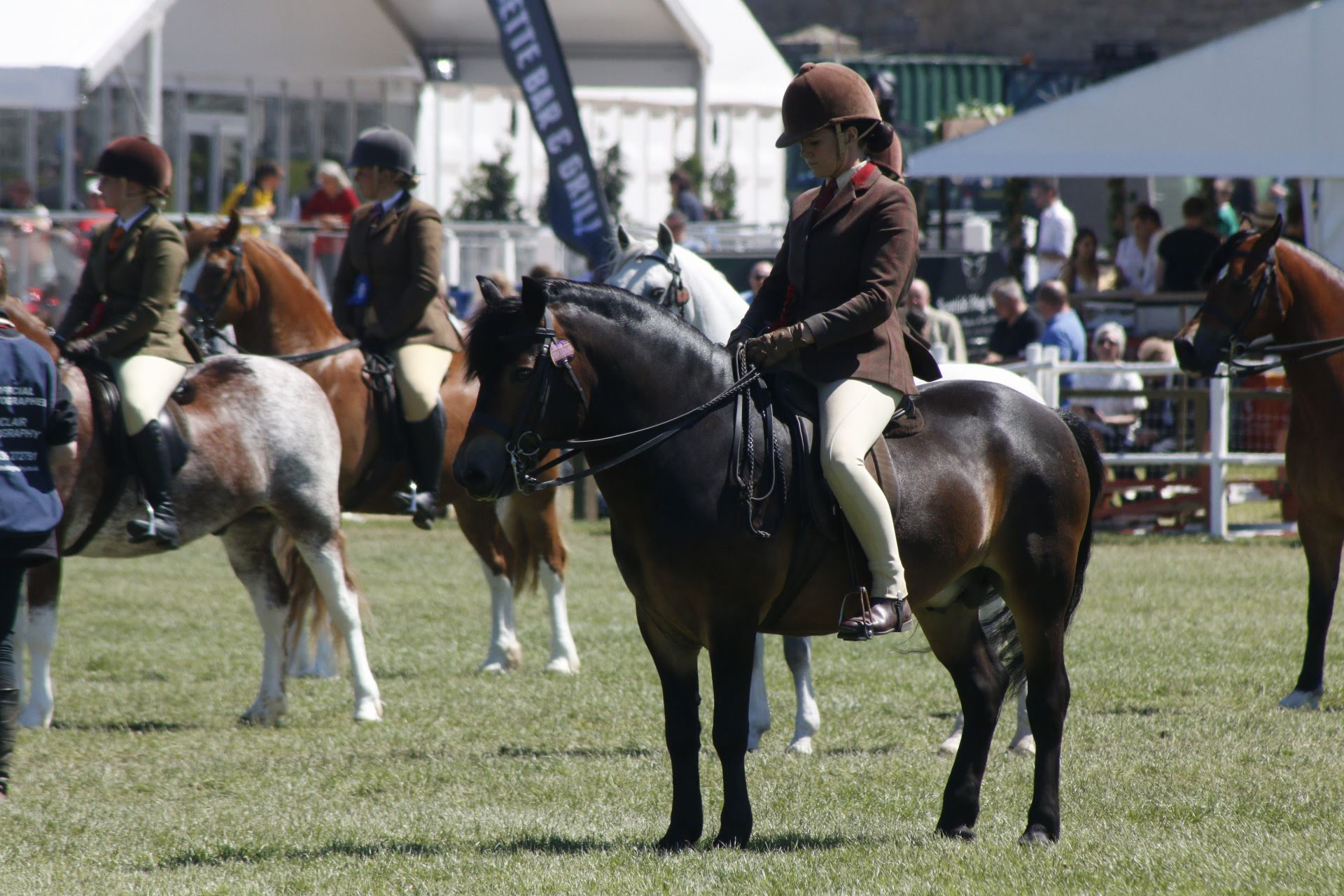
Exmoor stallion, Dunkery Wigeon in the Mountain and Moorland pony championship at the Royal Highland Show 2018, ridden by Hayley Reynolds
