= Prospectus (university) =

Document sent to potential students

A university or school prospectus is a document sent to potential (prospective) students to attract them to apply for admission. It usually contains information about the institution and the available courses, including advice on how to apply and the benefits of accepting a place. Many universities have an individual prospectus for each course or group of courses that they offer. Most universities have both online and paper versions of their prospectus, and they are divided into an undergraduate prospectus and a postgraduate prospectus. If asked, an application form can be sent.

== Appearance ==
The prospectus usually contains information on the individual courses, the staff (professors), notable alumni, the campus, special facilities (like performance halls for music schools or acting stages for drama schools), how to get in contact with the university, and how to get to the university.

Some universities also provide an audio recording of their prospectus being read aloud on CD for the sight-impaired. A prospectus for entry in a specific year or semester/term (e.g. September 2007) is usually available one to one-and-a-half years beforehand.

Some universities also use the term 'prospectus' to mean the formal meeting for proposing a graduate thesis or dissertation.

== Etymology ==
Prospectuses are similar to syllabi because they both give a summary of a class, just like a prospectus would. Although originally a Latin word, in English use, it is pluralized prospectuses. Its Latin plural would be prospectūs.
