= Henry J. Webb =

19th-century English scholar and sportsperson

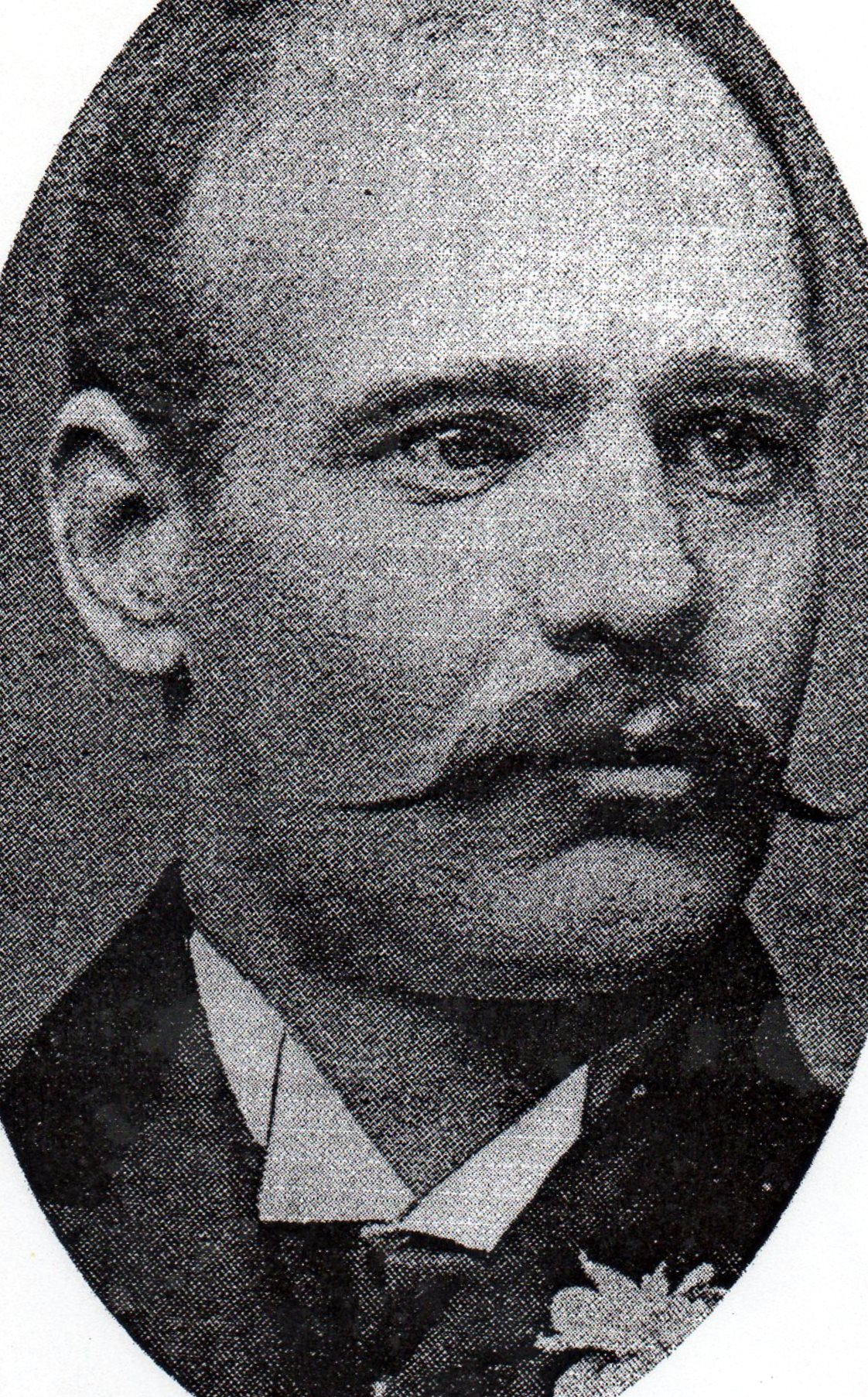
- Principal to the Aspatria Agricultural College
- Born: 1846
- Died: 1893 (aged 46–47)
- Education: University College, London
- Occupation: Botanist

Henry John Webb (1846–1893) was an English scholar, who became a trained botanist before moving into medicine. However, it was eventually agriculture and the training of scientific, practical agriculturalists that eventually caught his imagination. In 1887 he accepted the position of Principal to the Aspatria Agricultural College, a radical institution in the North of England, which a group of enthusiastic amateurs had established in 1874, for the purpose of training the sons of tenant farmers and farm labourers. In 1891 he became sole owner of the College, which he rebuilt and under his guidance it became one of the foremost seats of agricultural learning in England. He was also a successful world record holding cyclist and tricyclist.

== Early life ==
Webb was born at Upper Norwood in 1846, the son of a Professor of Botany and Rural Economy.

== Education ==
Webb began his education at Blackheath, where he passed the Oxford and Cambridge senior examination. On leaving school he became junior English and Science master at Cranford College, Maidenhead. After three years of teaching experience he gained a First Class pass in the matriculation examination set by the University of London. He also obtained a scholarship in biology from the School of Mines, South Kensington; where he studied Zoology, Botany, Chemistry, Experimental Physics and Geology. After three years study he entered University College, London. In 1884 he graduated in first place with a BSc First Class Honours degree in Botany. He also entered an examination for the Licentiate of the College of Preceptors, where he took first place and the Council Prize for natural science.

== Career ==
After a period of teaching, Webb entered University College Hospital, where after two years he passed the examination of the College of Physicians and the intermediate examination for a Bachelor of Medicine. His next appointment was that of Professor of Animal morphology and Physiology at the Birkbeck Institute. During this period he also lectured on Botany at University College School. It was at this juncture that he became interested in agricultural education and after passing an examination with honours at the South Kensington College he proceeded to France to study a variety of agricultural teaching methods. In 1886, after attending Jena University in Germany, he gained his PhD, writing a treatise on the sexual differences of plants. Upon his return to England, Webb applied for the vacant position of Principal to the Aspatria Agricultural College and was accepted in the fore of 120 applicants. Shortly after taking over the role of Principal at Aspatria, he entered a government sponsored examination in the subjects of Agriculture and Agricultural Chemistry, where he finished in first place ahead of forty prominent entrants.

== Sporting achievements ==
Webb was cousin to Captain Matthew Webb (1848–1883), the first recorded person to swim the English Channel, who later lost his life attempting to swim through the Whirlpool rapids below Niagara Falls. Henry was a celebrated athlete in his own right. He was the first to cycle the return journey between London and Portsmouth in a single day. In 1884, he won over £200 in prize money, winning the world 50-mile (80 km) tricycle championship at The Crystal Palace; and the 100-mile (160 km) national championship, which he completed on the Great North Road in 7 hours 35 minutes. Although he held world records at 1/4, 2, 15, 26 and 100 miles, his greatest sporting achievement came after he rode from Lands End to John O'Groats in a time of 7 days 58 minutes cutting 16 hours 47 minutes off the previous record; a phenomenal achievement, in the days before the invention of a freewheel, braking being performed by back treading.

== Parliamentary commission ==
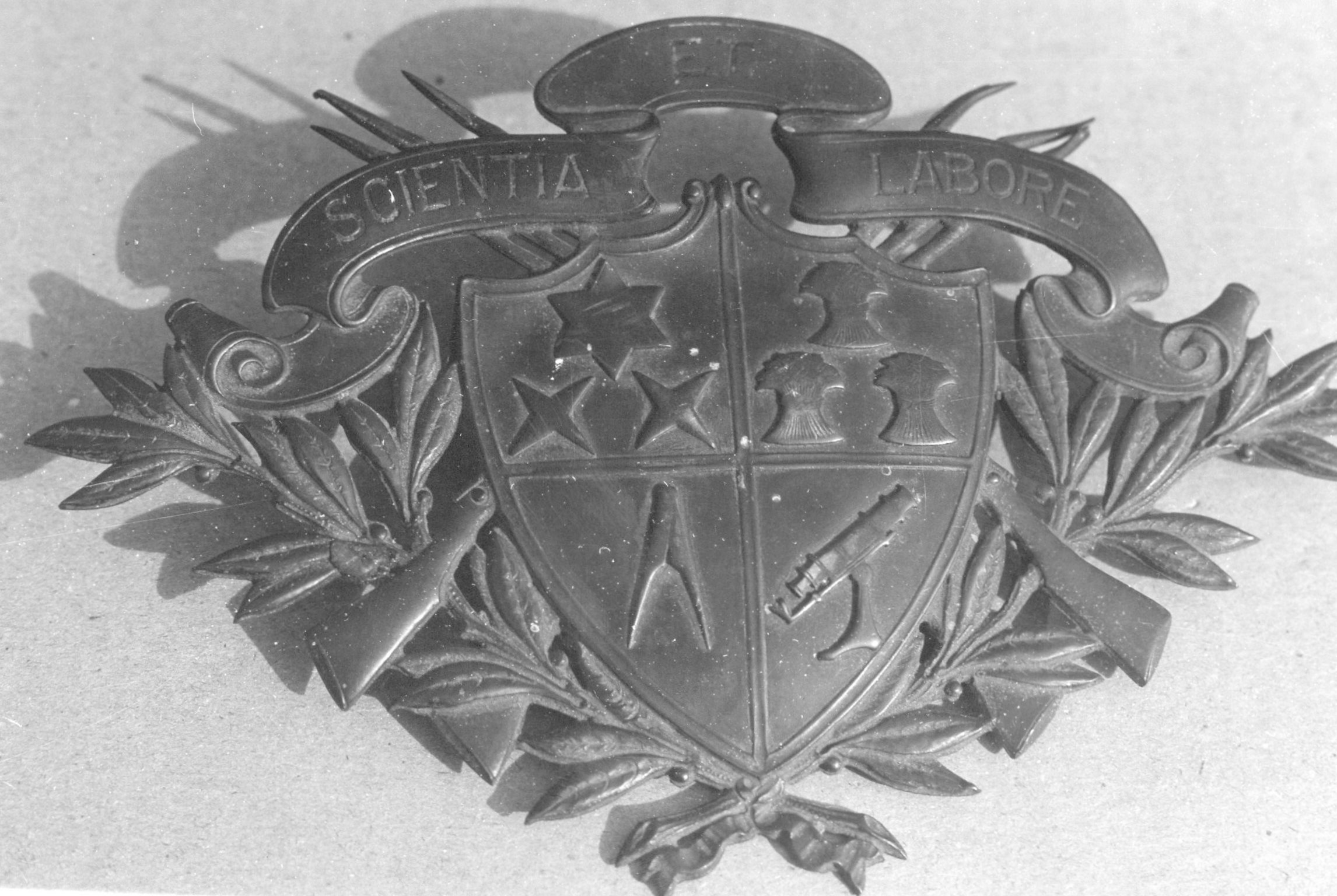
The emblem of the Aspatria Agricultural College

In 1887, in the depth of the agricultural depression, the British Government instigated a Commission under the chairmanship of Sir Richard Paget, 1st Baronet, to enquire into the working activities of Agricultural Colleges and Dairy Schools for the purpose of awarding Government grants. Previous to this report agriculture's only support had been in the form of grants, awarded to maintain students sitting for the theoretical examination of the Science and Arts Department, South Kensington College, London (the S. & A.D.). The commissioners were very critical and highlighted the national cost of inadequate agricultural education and poor Dairy practice. Since the Aspatria Agricultural College was the only institution of its kind in England to provide agricultural education for the sons of tenant farmers and to give elementary instruction in science to farm labourers, Webb was called to give evidence. He described his views as contrary to those held by contemporary authorities in Leeds, Newcastle, Edinburgh, and Cambridge. These administrations, he argued, promoted only scientific and theoretic instruction at the expense of practical work. Webb described his prime objective as reinforcing theoretical knowledge with the practical experience gained from daily instruction on farms, as embodied in the college motto "Scientia et Labore". He also stressed the importance of educating people, irrespective of their age. Webb's advice appears to have carried favour, for the Commission recognised.

The school at Aspatria is on a very different footing to the other institutions mentioned and is doing very good work in admitting students at lower fees. [...] If anything is done to encourage schools of this kind the claims of Aspatria stand in the first rank, for in consequence of the lowliness of its fees it is struggling under great difficulties, but is a type of school which would be of great use to the small farmer class for their sons.

In their published report the Commission recognised many of the faults appertaining to agricultural education and recommended the need for state aid. Their primary proposal endorsed the immediate creation of five regional Dairy Schools in England. Each endowed with an annual working grant of £500. Grants were also available for purchasing buildings, while a further award of £200 was available for equipment and fittings. They made one additional grant and this was a sum of £300 awarded to the Aspatria College. In the ensuing four years Aspatria received a total of £1,350 in government grants.

== Technical education ==
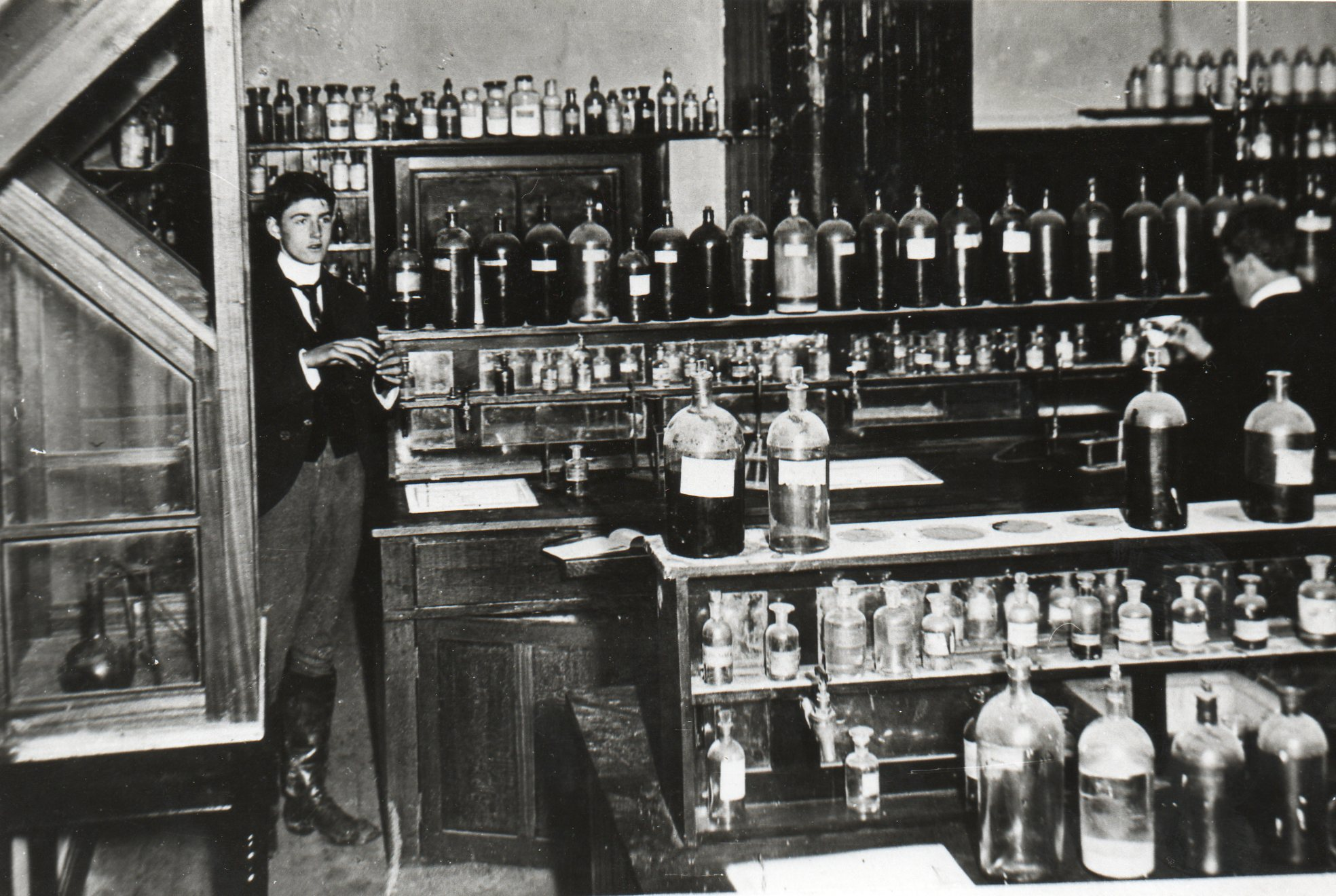
The Science laboratory at Aspatria Agricultural College

An Act by the British parliament in 1888, created Local Authorities in the form of County Councils. The 1889 Technical Education Act allowed these authorities to fund technical and manual instruction out of the rates. In the same year the government established the Board of Agriculture. In 1891, the Technical Education Committee of the Cumberland County Council embarked on their programme of travelling lectures and practical demonstrations. In response, Webb elected to offer instruction on a wide range of agricultural and mining related subjects; and once commissioned threw the entire weight of his enthusiasm into the action. Webb was afterwards appointed lecturer on dairying under the Cumberland County Council, and was a strong advocate of a scientific system of butter making instead of the 'rule of thumb' methods usually applied by farmer's wives. Webb was also engaged as a lecturer on agriculture under the County Council of Lancashire and Cumberland.

== Academic publications ==
Webb wrote a multitude of articles and papers and had at least 6 books published within his lifetime. Titles include:

- Elementary Agriculture: A Text Book etc., (Longmann London 1894)
- Advanced Agriculture, (Longmann 1891 London)
- Agriculture: A Manual for Advanced Science Students, (Longmann London 1914)
- Principles of Agriculture, (Longmann London 1889)
- The Art of Butter Making
- The Dairy and its Equipment, with Practical Management of Milk and Cream Milk: Its Composition and Mode of Production
- The Feeding of Dairy Cattle

== Death ==
In mid November 1893, a group of masters and students competed in a ‘paper chase'. Unfortunately the day was not without its mishaps; and a student named Hammack slipped and gashed his foot on a protruding rock. A minor injury by today's standards, but blood poisoning set in and three weeks later the student died. It was a well-attended funeral. Webb headed a procession of fifty students, who walked in a file from the college to the churchyard. The weather was hostile and later that day Webb developed a chill that quickly evolved into a severe case of pneumonia and death was sudden. A contemporary obituary summed up his life in the following manner:

Dr. Webb was a man who always endeavoured to be abreast of the times. In addition to his thorough scientific knowledge, he possessed a highly developed faculty for organisation. When we realise these facts, it goes a long way to explain why the Aspatria Agricultural College was such a success under his supervision.

== Bibliography ==
- Andrew Humphries (1996). Seeds of Change: 100 years Contribution to Rural Economy. London: Newton Rigg.
