= Royal Highland and Agricultural Society of Scotland =

Scottish charity with Royal Charter aiming at the advancement of agriculture

- Formation: 1784
- Location: Ingliston House, Royal Highland Centre, Ingliston, Edinburgh, EH28 8NB
- Members: ~16,000
- Key people: President: Fiona Armstrong, Lady MacGregor; Chairman: James J Logan

The Royal Highland and Agricultural Society of Scotland (RHASS) was founded in Edinburgh in 1784 as the Highland Society of Edinburgh. The society is responsible for organising the annual Royal Highland Show.

== History ==
The society had its root in 1723 when the Society of Improvers of the Knowledge of Agriculture in Scotland was created in Edinburgh. This society was abandoned in 1746. A similar society under the name Highland Society of Scotland was created in 1784 with 100 members largely in reaction to the subsistence crises of 1782/3 when many of the estates in the highlands and islands of Scotland were not producing enough food to feed tenants.

It received a royal charter in 1787 becoming the Royal Highland Society of Scotland, at which membership rose to 150. By the 1870s, membership grew to 4650. The society granted bursaries for education and also ran the Argyll Fund, which educated "young highland gentleman" for the Navy, which was instigated by John Campbell, 5th Duke of Argyll.

In 1828, they began the Quarterly Journal of Agriculture. From the same time they were housed in a purpose built building on George IV Bridge at the head of Victoria Street in Edinburgh's Old Town. The building also held an agricultural museum. Now attached to Edinburgh Central Library, it houses the music library.

Famous members include Henry Mackenzie (a director), Sir Walter Scott, and James MacDonald, secretary from 1893 to 1912.

== See also ==
- Highland Society of London
- Royal Highland Showground
