= List of English and Welsh endowed schools (19th century) =

This is a list of some of the endowed schools in England and Wales existing in the early part of the 19th century. It is based on the antiquarian Nicholas Carlisle's survey of "Endowed Grammar Schools" published in 1818 with descriptions of 475 schools but the comments are referenced also to the work of the Endowed Schools Commission half a century later. Most English and Welsh endowed schools were at the time described as grammar schools, but by the 18th century there were three groups: older prestigious schools becoming known as "public schools"; schools in manufacturing towns that innovated to some extent in syllabus; and more traditional grammar schools in market towns and rural areas.

A medieval grammar school was one which taught Latin, and this remained an important subject in all the schools, which generally followed the traditions of the universities of Oxford and Cambridge, from which almost all of their graduate schoolmasters came. Some of the schools listed by Carlisle had long been fee-paying public schools, although in most cases (as at Eton and Winchester) retaining some provision for the teaching of "scholars" who paid reduced or no fees.

An endowment for educational purpose was intended by the founder or founders to be legally binding in perpetuity. However the object of such endowments was not always fully honoured by those controlling the schools.

Carlisle compiled his list by means of a questionnaire, which was not always answered. The Commission's report built on his research, while not accepting all his claims on the continuity of certain schools from monastic and chantry foundations, which affected the dating of schools. The chronological list in the report has numerous further details of endowments.

There is little consistency in the actual names of grammar schools from this period. Many were called "free schools". Carlisle used some unorthodox spellings, and he listed Hampshire under its alternative historical name of Southamptonshire.

== Bedfordshire ==
Standard name	Other names	Foundation	Status now	Comments	References
Bedford Grammar School	Bedford School	15 August 1552	Independent	Sir William Harpur Knt, alderman of London, endowed the school in the name of the Commonalty of Bedford, with letters patent granted by King Edward VI. Visitors were elected from the warden and fellows of New College, Oxford. Harpur stood surety of 13 acres and 1 rood of meadow in St Andrew, Holborn for the letters patent. An act of Parliament of 1764 granted 12 acres and a rood on a case decision reserved in chancery to Sir Thomas Fisher, Bt. This land became housing called the Charity Estate. Another act, in 1793, made the town corporation responsible for "repairing leases". New College, Oxford controlled the appointment of master and usher.	
Houghton Conquest Grammar School		5 June 1632	Maintained Lower ('Primary') School	Sir Francis Clerke, MA Cantab, was the founder around 1630, when an almshouse and close (6 acres and 4 small closes called the pighties) were conveyed by deed of title. The school was located in the upper rooms of the alms house. Masters were from Sidney Sussex College, Cambridge. It was formerly a flourishing school that sent scholars to university. An endowment of lands valued at £140 was bequeathed in 1691; In 1720 described thus "here is a publick school endowed...". Trustees included the Earl of Upper Ossory and the Duke of Bedford. In an account published by the Bedfordshire County Records Archive Office, there is continuity shown between the old endowed school and the current local maintained school, Houghton Conquest Lower School The old school and almshouses were demolished in 1970.	

== Berkshire ==
For Eton College see Buckinghamshire.

Standard name	Other names	Foundation	Status now	Comments	References
Abingdon Grammar School	Roysse's School; Abingdon School	1562	Independent	A benefaction by John Roysse, citizen and mercer of London was to an existing grammar school. Two houses in Birchin Lane were bequeathed to Dr Abbott, Archbishop of Canterbury, for his foundation, intended for Balliol College; letters patent were granted on 22 June 1624; and the foundation was further endowed by William Bennet of Christ's Hospital in Abingdon.	
Childrey Grammar School	The Fettiplace School	1515	Defunct	A chantry foundation by William Fettiplace of Childrey, it survived as a school in Chantry House, Childrey until 1726. A new schoolhouse was built in 1732 by Sir George Fettiplace, and kept repaired by Queens College, Oxford, who paid £8 per annum to the schoolmaster. The visitors were the Rector and Scholars of Lincoln College, Oxford. In 1913, the school converted to a primary school. The buildings were closed in the 1940s.	
Newbury Grammar School	St Bartholomew's School	1466	Comprehensive Academy	Originally attached to St Bartholomew's Hospital, London, it was reported on the death of the master on 3 November 1614 that the school was defunct. A new grammar school was granted a charter in 1677.	
Reading Grammar School	Reading School	1445	Grammar School Academy	According to Carlisle's account between 1445 and 1486 a school was founded by John Thorne, Abbot of Reading on instruction from Henry VII. Subsequently, after the dissolution of the monasteries the master was paid by the Crown. In 1557 Sir Thomas White founded two scholarships at St John's College, Oxford. As stated in a charter of 23rd Sept 1560 the town corporation took responsibility for the school in exchange for the grant of lands by the Crown. Archbishop Laud was a benefactor of the school and appointed three visitors 'viz-The Vice-Chancellor of the University of Oxford, The President of St.John's, and the Warden of All Souls College'.	
Wallingford Grammar School	Wallingford School	1659	Comprehensive Academy	Founded by Walter Bigg, alderman of London, and endowed with £10 p.a. A further £20 p.a. was contributed by Sir Thomas Bennett's Charity.	
Wantage Grammar School	King Alfred's Grammar School, King Alfred's Academy	1597	Comprehensive Academy	Wantage town lands held by trustees maintained a grammar school master by an act of Parliament, 39 Eliz (AD 1597). Prior to 1849 the school was located in the town's churchyard. In that year, the millenary of the birth of King Alfred it took the new name and moved to a new site. Carlisle (1818) states "that no Charity can be better managed, or the profits disposed more to the Donor's intentions, than the present"	

== Buckinghamshire ==
Standard name	Other names	Foundation	Status now	Comments	References
Amersham Grammar School	Dr Challoner's Grammar School	1621	Boys' grammar school with academy status	Founded under the will of Robert Chaloner DD. The rector, canon of Windsor, on 20 June 1620, bequeathed £90 by his will and £20 p.a., for the maintenance of a divinity lecturer at Christ Church, Oxford. The free grammar school was established by decree of the Commission of Charitable Uses. Of the pupils, three poor scholars hailed from Goldsborough and Amersham, and Knaresborough, Yorks.	
Aylesbury Grammar School		1598	Boys' grammar school with academy status	A free school was founded by Sir Henry Lee of Ditchley, Oxfordshire around 1584. The documents in Oxford were destroyed in the Civil War in the 1640s, but the premises were bequeathed to the school around 1700. A further endowment was entailed by Henry Phillips, and a free school built in 1718.	
Buckingham Grammar School	The Royal Latin School	1423	Coeducational grammar school with academy status	Refounded by Edward VI in 1548 with an endowment of £10 8s. 1/2d.per annum.	
Eton College	Founded as The King's College of The Blessed Marie of Etone besides Wyndsor	12 September 1440	Independent	Unusually founded by three successive charters in 1441 and 1442. The hope that the foundation would be permanent was represented by the motto Esto perpetua and (according to the lore) by the sable background in the college's coat of arms. The original buildings were in part constructed of durable Kentish stone. King Henry VI founded the college, "habentes in animo ut in secula duraturum jam fundatum Collegium..." (Note: translation: "[we] have in mind that the college now founded will endure for centuries") It was confirmed by act of Parliament on 4 May 1444; and statutes were finalised by Archbishop Waynflete, schoolmaster of Winchester, and founder of Magdalen College, Oxford, on 20 July 1446. Edward IV issued letters patent on 17 July 1468; and granted a lands purchase under the Statutes of Mortmain. Under the papal Bulla Unionis he added an eighth dean to those canons of Windsor. The college's endowments were much reduced by Edward IV after the death of Henry VI.	
Royal Grammar School, High Wycombe		1548	Boys' grammar school with academy status	Town burgesses confirmed the endowment of a school in 1551, but it did not receive a royal charter until 21 July 1562. The master was endowed with a house, garden and orchard of two acres. "Good instruction" followed in Latin.	
Marlow Grammar School	Sir William Borlase's Grammar School	1624	Coeducational grammar school with academy status	Founded by Sir William in memory of Henry Borlase MP on his son's death in 1624. By Sir William's will of October 1628, the school was endowed with lands in the parish, and at Bix Gibwin, Oxfordshire. The governor was customarily the lord of the manor of Davers. (Note: sometimes written as Danvers in modern times, but not in the text. Danvers was associated with Devonshire and Derbyshire.)	

== Cambridgeshire ==
Standard name	Other names	Foundation	Status now	Comments	References
Cambridge Grammar School	The Perse School	1615	Independent	Founded by Stephen Perse MD, senior fellow of Gonville and Caius College, Cambridge. The founder's scholarship favoured entrants to that college. By 1615 there was room for 100 scholars, natives of Cambridge, Barnwell, Chesterton, or Trumpington.	
Ely Grammar School	The King's School, Ely, King's Ely	c. 970, refounded 1541	Independent	Ely's master was appointed by the dean and chapter of the cathedral. Now a boarding school.	
Wisbech Grammar School		1379	Independent	Founded by the Holy Trinity Fraternity of monks. At the Reformation, parliament granted the town and Capital Burgesses a charter and master on an ecclesiastical stipend of £12. Rents of £30 p.a. were used to fund the school by the will of John Crane, in lieu of land tax. Further endowed by Thomas Parke, High Sheriff of Cambridgeshire (1628), and bye-fellowships to Peterhouse College. The fund was later vested with the accountant-general of chancery by the will of William Holmes of Exeter (2 April 1656).	

== Cheshire ==
Standard name	Other names	Foundation	Status now	Comments	References
Audlem Grammar School		1653	Defunct	Founded by Sir William Bolton, Thomas Gamull and Ralph Bolton, citizens of London. A total endowment of £40 was charged equally to the Merchant Taylors Company and to an estate in Coole Lane, Audlem. Closed in 1908. Audlem Senior Mixed Council School opened on the premises in 1913.	
Chester Grammar School	The King's School, Chester	1541	Independent	Founded on the dissolution of St Werburgh Abbey. The dean and chapter appointed 24 boys to the school. The cloisters, dormitory and reader's pulpit were all used by the school. The cathedral was responsible for the master (a lay canon) and his salary.	
Congleton Grammar School		c. 1560	Defunct	Daniel Lysons wrote that Congleton had a grammar school in the reign of Elizabeth I. Not a strong endowment: boys were admitted on reading the Protestant New Testament. It was controlled by the borough (18th century). Benefaction dating from 1708. The school closed in 1901. A Congleton County Girls’ Grammar School was opened in the mid 20th century but had no links to the endowed school.	
Daresbury Grammar School		1600	Defunct	Richard Rider of Preston-on-the-Hill and others endowed with interest of £185 p.a., a grammar school in the parish of Runcorn, to be taught by Oxbridge qualified schoolmasters. The scheme of 13 May 1875 was varied by the scheme of 3 October 1895 and again amended on 12 September 1996 by a resolution under the provisions of s.75 of the Charity Commissioners Act 1993. In 1998 the Daresbury Grammar School Endowment was removed from the UK Government Register of Charities as the endowed funds were spent up.	
Frodsham Grammar School	Helsby High School	1660	Amalgamated	Founded in 1660 by subscription, twenty-four feoffees from neighbouring parishes appointed the schoolmaster. A vestry chantry left an endowment in 1604. Another endowment by Mr Trafford was on condition that the master was appointed by the Company of Apothecaries, Chester. A free school was finally established in 1660. The Old Schoolhouse was completed in 1824. It was planned to move to the Helsby site in 1938, but the new school did not open until 1950. The then Frodsham High School closed in 2009.	
Hargrave Grammar School		1627	Defunct	Sir Thomas Moulson Bt, alderman and lord mayor of London, founded and endowed with £20 p.a. in the parishes of Tarvin and Great Budworth. Patronised by the bishop and chapter of Chester and Lord Grosvenor the school had royalist support.	
Knutsford Grammar School		1549	Defunct	Founded by Sir John Legh with 16 marks (£10 13s 4d) per annum. Waste land was enclosed for lettings of £24 p.a. to pay for the building of a new schoolroom. The Legh family endowed the original foundation, which closed in 1741. Three years later a new school building opened; it continued until 1885. The building was demolished in 1957.	
Lymm Grammar School	Lymm High School	1591	Comprehensive Academy	The later Elizabethan foundation was quickly followed by a royal charter in 1602. By the late 19th century the original site was split up by planners. It remained at Grammar School Lane until 1945, when Oughtringhton Hall was purchased by the county council, to which the school was fully transferred by 1957. On the abolition of the grammar school system, the school, already accepting free pupils, turned comprehensive. Since the 1980s it has merged with the Secondary Modern, with much of the old site redeveloped.	
Macclesfield Grammar School	The King's School	1502	Independent	Sir John Percyvale, later Lord mayor of London, established a chantry school in his home town at the Savage Chapel, in the parish church. The first schoolmaster was William Bridges. By 1854 it had already moved to its current site in Cumberland Street. In 1987 the school became co-educational when it merged with the Girls' High School. A royal visitation followed in 2002, when Queen Elizabeth II was introduced to the school's quinquennial celebrations.	
Malpas Grammar School	Bishop Heber High School	20 March 1527/8	Comprehensive Academy	The original school was founded by Sir Randulph Brereton of Malpas, knight and Chamberlain of Chester; and stood behind the market-place. Robert Whittington of Lichfield (d. 1560) wrote an early English account of the chantry school reading Latin Canticum graduum, De Profundis clamavi ad te Domine ("A Song of degrees: Out of the depths have I cried unto thee, O Lord") from Psalm 129 (Psalm 130 in KJV). Brereton paid the schoolmaster, and funded the school, as did founders Humphrey Dymocke of Wyllington, Owen Brereton and David Dodde of Egge. There was a refounding by Rev. Hugh, Earl Cholmondely in 1697–8.	
Middlewich Grammar School	Middlewich High School	c. 1590	Comprehensive Academy	The endowment was nominated by Sir Iain Frederick Leycester, Bart to a master.	
Stockport Grammar School		1487	Independent	Founded by Sir Edmond Shaa, goldsmith and alderman of the City of London. It moved to its site in the town on Adlington Square in 1608. Between 1830 and 1916 the school was located at the corner of Greek Street and Wellington Road in a building occupying part of the site of the present Stockport College. The school moved again to purpose-built premises at Mile End, then on the outskirts of the town, subsequently absorbing the adjacent site of the town's Convent High School in 1978.	
Tarvin Grammar School	Tarvin Hall School; Collegiate School	1641	Defunct	A charitable foundation by Mr Randall Pickering Jr for the benefit of the poor in the parish, according to a Charitable Commission Report. The pupils used the rare Richard Valpy grammars. Tarvin Hall was used to house the school from 1776. Dr Brindley renamed it the Collegiate School in 1851. He was a progressive (too liberal on discipline and morals for the time), and was asked to quit the following year. The school closed in 1939.	
Wallasey Grammar School	The Kingsway Academy	1656-7	Defunct	Founded by Dutchman Maj. Henry Meolse and brother Capt. William Meolse. From 1799 a building in Breck Road was used. It moved to the Leasowe site in 1967 when it became Wallasey Comprehensive School. Renamed Kingsway School (2014) and became an academy in 2015. It closed in 2018.	
Witton Grammar School	Northwich Grammar School; Sir John Deane's College	1557	Sixth Form College	Founded by Sir John Deane, Prebendary of Lincoln and Rector of St Bartholomew's, London. The school was initially located adjacent to St Helen's, Witton. Sir John Brunner, a wealthy industrialist and benefactor aided the school to construct new buildings in 1908. The school has been a co-educational Sixth Form College since 1978. Since 2014 it has Academy status.	

== Cornwall ==
Standard name	Other names	Foundation	Status now	Comments	References
Bodmin Grammar School	Bodmin County School; Bodmin Community School; Bodmin Community College; Bodmin College	c. 1560	Comprehensive Academy	It was not a free school when founded in Bodmin churchyard. Endowed by Crown lands from the Duchy of Cornwall. A poor boys school, it had no scholarships nor exhibitions, but could take only boys from the town. In the early 19th century it became connected with Clare Hall, Cambridge and the Prideaux family. In 1973, headteacher Arthur Hayward unified the secondary modern and grammar schools to found the (currently named) Bodmin College.	
St Ives Grammar School		1639	Defunct	Founded in the town by charter of King Charles I. The Bishop of Exeter and mayor and Burgesses of St Ives were appointed governors. The schoolhouse was built on Barnoon Hill. The school had an income of only £10 per annum, so had to be closed in 1673.	
Launceston Grammar School	The Royal Grammar School, Launceston College	1685	Comprehensive Academy	The school's benefactor London merchant George Baron, originally from nearby village Tregeare endowed it on 9 October 1685, a benefaction continued by his heirs. He specified a grammar school to the town for £10 p.a., situated behind St Stephen's churchyard payable from revenues from the manor of "Paris Garden" in Christchurch Surrey. The Duke of Northumberland, a significant local landowner, later pledged a further £15 p.a.	
Liskeard Grammar School	Liskeard County School; Liskeard School and Community College	1550	Comprehensive Academy	There was no endowment, but it was under the patronage of the Duchy of Cornwall, when it was originally built on the site of a Norman castle. Closed by act of Parliament in 1834 it was refounded in 1908 as Liskeard County School. From 1945 to closure in 1978 it was Liskeard Grammar School.	
Penryn Grammar School		c. 1580	Defunct	Founded by the Duchy on behalf of Queen Elizabeth I in the parish of St Gluvias with a meagre endowment of £6 18s., the school originally opened with only three pupils. In 1758 John Verran bequeathed by will £1,000, to which James Humphrey Esq added £3,000 in 1823.	
Saltash Grammar School	Saltash Free School	c. 1580	Defunct	A free school was founded by the Duchy in the name of Queen Elizabeth with an endowment of £7 p.a.	
Truro Grammar School	Truro Cathedral School	c. 1580	Defunct	Styled a free school; one of its original benefactors was County Recorder, Viscount Falmouth, who contributed a "generous" £25 p.a., and donated three gold medals. There was a scholarship and two exhibitions to Exeter College, Oxford according to a deed of trust in chancery on 14 March 1767. On £30 p.a. they afforded one scholar to Exeter College, Oxford. Closed in 1982. The old building was converted into an inn.	

== Cumberland ==
Standard name	Other names	Foundation	Status now	Comments	References
St Bees Grammar School	The Free Grammar School of Archbishop of Canterbury, Edmund Grindall in Kyrby Beacock alias St Beghes, in the County of Cumberland; St Bees School	24 April 1583	Independent	Among its benefactors were the Provost of Queen's College, Oxford and the Rector of Egremont, "the said Letters Patent to be purchased and obtained by the said Wardens and Governors shall be fulfilled." Endowed with "Palmer's Fields", Croydon, Surrey worth £50 p.a. After Grindall's death a second patent was issued on 15 June. The land came into the possession of Sir Thomas Chaloner, who bequeathed it. (Note: bequeathed means he left the property in his will; "so bequeathed it" means he left the land to St Bees Grammar School)The school's endowment was augmented on 25 June 1604 by fields and meadows in Kirkby Beacock. The school became co-educational in 1978. The school closed in 2015 but re-opened three years later.	
Saint Bees College	St Bees Theological College	1817	Defunct	Founded by Rt Rev George Henry Law, DD, Bishop of Chester. The perpetual curacy was created by Queen Anne's Bounty to a total of £300. The Earl of Lonsdale built a reading room in the old abbey for the students known as literates. The school declined and closed in 1895.	
Blencow Grammar School	The Free Queen Elizabeth Grammar School	7 December 1577	Defunct	The free grammar school was founded by Thomas Burbank near Penrith in the name of Queen Elizabeth I. Originally endowed with lands in Northamptonshire, it was expanded by owners at Brixworth and Culgaith in Cumberland. A rentcharge on Yanwath Hall continued the Earl of Lonsdale's commitment to education in the county. The school closed in 1911 and the premises converted to a private residence in 1917.	
Bromfield Grammar School		7 May 1612	Defunct	In his will Richard Osmotherley, citizen and mercer of London, left a foundation for the poor children of Langrigg and Bromfield payable by the Merchant Taylors' Company; nine scholars were paid for, out of London rents. Rare use of Ward's grammars was exercised here. (Note: There were a number of Latin grammars published by various teachers through Oxford and Cambridge Universities. Some were more popular than others.)	
Burgh by Sands Grammar School	Burgh by Sands School	1543	Maintained (State) Primary School	Little is known about the origins of this school. The nonconformist living was ejected in 1662; a Quaker meeting-house opened. The schoolhouse was converted into a barn and used as a vestry by 1786, when Thomas Pattinson bequeathed a free education to the deserving poor of three parishes. (Note: These were Long Burgh, Moorhouse and Burgh-by-Sands. A distinction was made between the deserving poor and the non-deserving, who received alms for begging.) There was a charity school at Burgh, to which Richard Hodgson gave the interest of £50 p.a., and John Liddell the interest of £25 p.a.	
Carlisle Grammar School	Trinity School, Carlisle	685	Comprehensive Academy	Founded as a priory school in 685, and subsequently became the school of Carlisle Cathedral. The establishment included a grammar master in the year 1557.	
Cockermouth Grammar School		1676	Defunct	Founded by Philip, Lord Wharton, Sir Richard Grahame and others, and endowed in 1719. Embleton parish scholars paid a fleece tax on entry: a library was donated by the Bishop of Chester. From 1776 William Wordsworth was taught by Rev. Joseph Gilbanks at the school, but may have moved to Penrith, and then Hawkshead, where he was in 1779 quite unhappy. From 1881 it was opened by Gladstone's Home Secretary, Sir William Harcourt, as the Cockermouth Industrial School for Boys. The school was a two-storey complex, housed in a U-shaped yard. The school closed in 1921, but was later re-opened as a secondary school. It was redesignated as Cockermouth Grammar School by the Education Act 1944, but closed for the last time in 1990.	
Crosthwaite Grammar School	Common and Free School at Crosthwaite; Crosthwaite and Lyth Grammar School; Crosthwaite Primary School	18 February 1616	State Primary School	Founded in the reign of James I by George Cocke of the town for an endowment in his will, by an Inquisition held at Keswick. It responded to an earlier Ecclesiastical Causes Inquiry (1 October 1571) by the Province of York. By 1818 the land was valued at interest £100 p.a., and 260 scholars were at the school. An unruly nonconforming establishment that denied the vicar's right to appoint the headmaster; cock-fighting was only abolished there around 1800.	
Culgaith and Blencarn Grammar School	Howrigg School in Kirkland	1775	Defunct	Founded in the chapelry of Culgaith with 100 acres on Culgaith Moor by the Enclosure Commissioners. A schoolhouse was established at Blencarn Gate. A mortgage was taken out on the 100 acres of farmland to fund the school house and master. The land was sub-divided as ordered. The vicar of the parish was the schoolmaster, but the school remained as an elementary school and never completed the transition into a grammar school.	
Dalston Grammar School		c. 1660	Defunct	Original benefaction was by Dr. Edward Rainbowe, Lord Bishop of Carlisle. The original Church Stock was looted during the Civil War. In the new endowment Manors of Dalton and New Hall. On the murder of a tenant all customs of the manor were forfeited to the bishop. An Indenture was drafted in favour of Jonathan Green of Hawksdale. In his will Green named Robert Thomlinson of the Gill gave a parcel of New Hall held the messuage and tenement with the Appurtenances in trust for the school. Enclosure Act 1803 secured a further 8 acres. Michael Strong's will of 1814 introduced girls to a free grammar education.	
Dean Grammar School	The Free Grammar School at Dean; Dean Church of England School	1596	State Primary school	Founded by John Fox, Goldsmith, with a rent charge of £10 p.a. The Goldsmiths Company appointed the master.	
Hunsonby Grammar School		1726	Defunct	Founded by Joseph Hutchinson, Esq., on the death of his mother, when the reversion of the estate at Gawtree was used to support the school. 20 or 30 children from the Township of Hunsonby and Windscale were eligible for a free education.	
Maughanby Grammar School	The Free School at Maughanby	1634	Defunct	Founded by a Prebendary of Carlisle, Rev. Edward Mayplett, Vicar of Addingham, and endowed with a house and 70 acres, which was let out. The school was induced to instruct "in the Cathechism of the Church of England" using the Westminster Grammars.	
Penrith Grammar School	Penrith Free Grammar School	1564	Coeducarional grammar school with academy status	Earlier chantry foundation in 1395 by William de Strickland, later Bishop of Carlisle, but a school existed on the site as early as 1340. The chantry was dissolved in 1547, and paid to the Crown. Sir Thomas Smith, Dean of Carlisle, granted a charter in the Seigniory and chief town in the Forest of Inglewood, and endowed it with £6 p.a. The Eton Latin grammars were used, and Lady Hastings sponsored an exhibition to Queen's, Oxford.	
Plumbland Grammar School	The Free School at Plumbland	29 June 1759	Defunct	Captain John Sibson, merchant, founded by his will; he endowed a schoolhouse. Two rooms were for the classics and other subjects.	
Thursby Grammar School		1802	Defunct	Founded by Thomas Thomlinson of Newburn, NC, who had settled at Thursby. In 1798 £354 was bequeathed under the supervision of Sir Wattel Brisco, Bart., of Crofton Hall for the master. Non-classical curriculum of the three R's reading under Ward's Latin and Greek grammars.	
Uldale Grammar School		1726	Defunct	Matthew Caldbeck of Ruthwaite was the founder. He endowed £100 on condition that parcels of parish lands in Uldale and Ireby should be used.	
Whitcham and Millom Grammar School		1549	Defunct	Elizabethan Rev. Robert Hodgson of Whitcham founded the school. An annuity of 16 livres (Note: old English pounds) in consequence of a decree in chancery (1687–91). A school of Edward VI was founded by royal decree and £16 p.a. paid by the Auditor of Cumberland. Poor stock was also granted with interest from the rector, Robert Crompton in 1630. There were no university places nor exhibitions; ten pupils went free.	
Wigton Grammar School	The Nelson Thomlinson School	1730	Comprehensive	Robert Thomlinson, D.D., Rector of Wickham and his brother, Rector of Rothbury (1719) founded a school and endowed it with £20 p.a., arising from a rent-charge on the estate at Houghton Castle. The original Wigton chantry was for the poor boys of the parish. Four from Aspatria went free; they fell into dilapidation, before rescued by the endowed school four miles away.	
Wreay Grammar School		1655	Defunct	The chapel of Wreay was founded by a petition to Edward Rainbow, Bishop of Carlisle. A schoolhouse was built in 1751. Twelve men acted as trustees to appoint the master. John Brown Esq. of Melguards bequeathed £200, with which his heirs the Losh family purchased land to support the school. An annual tradition took place on Shrove Tuesday involving teams of boys competing for a silver bell which subsequently was attached to the hat of the victorious team's captain.	

== Derbyshire ==
Standard name	Other names	Foundation	Status now	Comments	References
Ashbourne Grammar School	Queen Elizabeth's Grammar School	15 July 1585	Comprehensive Academy	Sir Thomas Cockayne and others founded the school on a petition to the Queen, and letters patent granted under the Great Seal. He vested trusteeship for governance in his heirs and successors. In 1610 Roger Oldfield donated £70 for land purchase; and Duke of Devonshire paid £6 p.a. for a head master, 1667.	
Chesterfield Grammar School	The Chapel School; Brookfield Community School, Chesterfield	1598	Comprehensive Academy	founded by the will of Godfrey Foljambe, Esq., of Watton in 1594, and endowed with £18 6s 8d., out of the Attenborough estate, County of Nottingham. The Corporation four years later gave permission to build a new school house. Being non-preferment establishment a chapel was built on Holy Well Street opposite St Helen's Fields. The foundation was approved by the Archbishop of York. Closed in 1990, its final site is now occupied by Brookfield Community School.	
Derby Grammar School	Derby School	c. 1160	Defunct	Originated by Walter Durdant. Refounded at St Peter's churchyard in 1554, the old grammar school closed in 1989 and was replaced by Derby Moor Academy, but in 1994 some of its old boys founded Derby Grammar School to replace it.	
Dronfield Grammar School	Dronfield Henry Fanshawe School	1579	Comprehensive	founded by Thomas Fanshaw Esq., Remembrancer of the Court of Exchequer, and endowed with lands in the parishes of Dronfield, Chesterfield and Eckington to the value of £30 p.a. Now Dronfield Henry Fanshawe School	
Hartshorn Grammar School		1626	Defunct	Founded by rector of the parish, William Dethick, it endowed Ticknall, near Burton-on-Trent. The scholars numbered from 40 to 70. The master was paid (1818) £30 per annum.	
Repton Grammar School	Now Repton School	1556	Independent	Three benefactors were married to daughters of the deceased founder, Sir John Port, who conveyed the property for a free grammar school in the reign of Queen Mary I. It became a Victorian public school.	
Risley Grammar School		1598	State Primary School	Sir Michael Willoughby and wife Catherine endowed funds from the manor of Wilsthorp to pay for a free grammar school at Risley, near Derby. Today the buildings are divided between the former Latin School (closed 1914) and a Church of England Primary School (Risley Lower Grammar CE (VC) Primary School).	
Wirksworth Grammar School	Anthony Gell School	1575	Comprehensive Academy	Founded by Anthony Gell of Hopton Hall and endowed with land at Wirksworth, Kirk Ireton, and Kniveton.	

== Devon ==
Standard name	Other names	Foundation	Status now	Comments	References
Ashburton Grammar School	St Lawrence Chapel School	1547	Defunct	A chantry school was built at St Lawrence, Ashburton from 1314. Henry VIII's Chantries Act 1545 abolished the old catholic schools to modernise establishments. In its place the grammar school was founded by William Blundell, endowed with land in the parishes of Staverton, Aveton Gifford and North Huish.	
Barnstaple Grammar School		1642	Defunct	Richard Ferris, a merchant, founded with annuity of £10, charged to the parish of Paracombe.	
Bideford Grammar School		1657	Defunct	The grammar school was rebuilt in 1657 by order of John Darracott, mayor; on an earlier foundation under the Bartholomew Act 1662. Maintenance of £200 by Mrs Stucley (d.1689); repaired buildings in 1780. A modest seat by the church with no emoluments.	
Chudleigh Grammar School		1668	Defunct	Founded by John Pinsent of Combe, a native of Chudleigh, lived in the parish of Croydon, Surrey. he was a prothonotary of common pleas. Endowment of £30 p.a. for maintenance of the master. It followed the doctrine of the Church of England and the Eton Grammar. Pynsent spent £200 on building the schoolhouse next the churchyard. The schoolhouse is now a private residence.	
Crediton Grammar School	The King's Newe Gramer Scole of Crediton; Queen Elizabeth's Grammar School, Crediton	1547	Comprehensive; Academy	The twelve governors of the hereditaments of the goods of the Church of Crediton otherwise Kyrton, Devon. Late King Henry VIII granted £200 consideration. In August 1547, the charter was granted the Bishop of Exeter, and lands in St Lawrence. The governors also nominated the Vicar of Crediton. For poor of Exminster and Crediton. Att-Gen. Sir Vicary Gibbs v. Rev John Rudhall (7 July 1808)	
Exeter Hospital of Saint John Baptist	The Free Grammar School; The Free English School; The Blue School	1240	Defunct	founded by brothers Gilbert and John Long. It was confirmed by King Henry III and Pope Boniface. Later 18th-century extensions to the chapel for boarders accommodation. Two schools were located here i.e. The Free Grammar School and The Free English School (also known as The Blue School).	
Exeter High Grammar School	Exeter Cathedral School	1343	Independent	Founded by Richard de Braylegh, Dean of Exeter on the chapter's lands. Sir John Acland of Culme-John endowed two scholars to Exeter College, Oxford (14 September 1609). Established on the profits of the high school about 1750. At the same time Canon Reynolds bequeathed £1,550 to establish Exhibitioners.	
Exeter Free Grammar School	The Free Grammar School; Exeter School	1 August 1633	Independent	Founded by the "godlie intencion of Thomas Walker"; the "Maior and Common Counsell" of Exeter by statute and ordinance. Adopted the arms of Hugh Crossing's family. At the time of Carlisle's book the school was accommodated within the premises of The Hospital of Saint John Baptist (see above).	
Honiton Grammar School	Allhallows College	1515	Defunct	Founded and endowed with £12 p.a., arising out of town lands. The modern college is located at Rousden, near Lyme Regis, Dorset. The Old Honitonians owe their origins to the Devonian school. The school closed in 1998.	
Kingsbridge Grammar School		1681	Defunct	Founded by Thomas Crispin, a fuller of Exeter; endowed by Washbear Hays in parish of Bradninch, Devon to the value of £30 p.a. The former school premises in Fore Street are now Grade II listed.	
Saint Mary of Ottery Grammar School	The King's School, Ottery St Mary	1337	State Secondary/6th Form College	Founded by John Grandsson, Bishop of Exeter who purchased the manor and church of Ottery; refounded by letters patent in 1545; a charter was granted in 1574.	
Plymouth Grammar School		1562	Defunct	The Corporation of Plymouth established a grammar school on the Charter House model; they paid a master £10 p.a. Some free places for deserving local boys and also fee-paying pupils; in final years coeducational; closed 1937.	
Plympton Grammar School	Hele's School	1653	State Secondary/6th Form College	Founded by Sir John Maynard in fulfilment of the will of Eliaeus Hele of Fardel. Endowed by an appropriation of £1,800, for a fee simple estate in parish of St Mary.	
Blundell's School		1599	Independent	Founded by Peter Blundell, a clothier, of Tiverton for "godly preachers of the Gospel".	
Totnes Grammar School	King Edward VI Community College	1554	Comprehensive; Academy	The Corporation of Totnes purchased the priory, endowed with the freehold of a tenement near Rostabridge, in Harberton valued at £40 p.a. on 60 acres.	

== Dorset ==
Standard name	Other names	Foundation	Status now	Comments	References
Blandford Grammar School	The Blandford School	1646	Comprehensive Academy	Founded by William Middleton, Abbot of Milton on manor and farm of the abbey. From 1970 to 1989 it was a secondary modern school.	
Cranborne Grammar School		1573	Maintained (State) Primary School	The Elizabethan free grammar school was followed a year later by a writing-school; but by 1605 the school was being held in the village's Market House. The Marquess of Salisbury paid for the schoolroom to be built, and it remained in Lord Cranborne's gift. Initially 20 sons of wealthy local tradesmen were educated here. In the 18th century it was converted into a nonconformist Academy by Rev John Thompson, Vicar of Horton. Later in the Victorian era it was a National School for the children of the poor on Christian principles.	
Dorchester Grammar School	The Thomas Hardye School	1579	Comprehensive Academy	Amalgamated with the Dorchester Grammar School for Girls and the Dorchester Modern School.	
Evershot Grammar School	Stickland's School	20 November 1628	Defunct	Founded by Christopher Stickland of Yealden, Bedfordshire, by an indenture in his home town "for the instruction and breeding of men children". An endowment of 80 acres at Over Kingcombe on a seven-year lease, "The schoolmaster nominated... by The Founder; and after by the Feoffees...." Stickland's deceased sister, Petronella Byworth enfeoffed for £50 in her will.	
Gillingham Grammar School	Gillingham School	1516	Comprehensive	According to Carlisle (1818) the founder was unknown. but by a decree of chancery (1598) customary manorial lands were granted "for the instruction of Youth in good literature".	
Milton Abbas Grammar School		1521	Defunct	Founded by William Middleton, Abbot of Milton on manor and farm of the abbey, which was dissolved in 1540. By the deed of 1521, Middleton The grammar school remained in the village until 1805, when it moved to Blandford Forum.	
Shaftesbury Grammar School	Shaftesbury School	1625	Comprehansive Academy	William Whitaker and William Hurman bought land from Jane Grove for £40 to grant occupation for a school in Bimport Street by indenture of enfeoffment a messuage, tenement, and gardens intended for use of mayor, recorder, and capital burgesses of the Borough of Shaston on the deed of conveyance. Latterly it fell into disrepair because the corporation was too poor. The deed was promoted by William Herbert, 3rd Earl of Pembroke.	
Sherborne Grammar School	Sherborne School	1437	Independent	Original foundation from Thomas Copeland. Re-founded by Edward VI in 1551 as King Edward's Free Grammar School for boys; it was granted the dissolved chantry of Martock. The schoolhouse was built on the site of the abbey by Sir John Horsey of Clifton Maybank in 1554. Statutes were made in 1679.	
Wimborne Minster Grammar School	Queen Elizabeth's School, Wimborne Minster	1497	Comprehensive Academy	Founded by Lady Margaret Beaufort, Countess of Richmond and Derby, mother of king Henry VII, by letters patent for a perpetual chantry. The dean and chapter "taught Grammar to all who came for instruction". At the Reformation it was a fee-farm raising tax for the Crown; and then in 1563 an Elizabethan courtier Lord Mountjoye took out a patent. Queen Elizabeth Grammar School merged with Wimborne Secondary School on the present site around 1970.	

== Durham ==
Standard name	Other names	Foundation	Status now	Comments	References
Bishop Auckland Grammar School	Free Grammar School of King James; King James I Academy	1605	Comprehensive Academy	Founded by Anna Swyfte and Ralph Maddison but not in Carlisle. Thomas Morton gave a school house in 1638.	
Darlington Grammar School	Queen Elizabeth Sixth Form College	1567	Sixth Form College	Endowed by Queen Elizabeth I's charter after dissolution of Robert Marshall's chantry. On 19 March 1688, there was an important charter drafted by John Middleton, Counsellor; and another in 1714 by John Cuthbert. Statutes on 3 February 1748 by Edmond Lowson, Robert Turner and Robert Robinson.	
Durham Grammar School	Durham College	1414	Independent	Founded by Bishop Langley	
Houghton le Spring Grammar School	Royal Kepier Grammar School	2 April 1574	Defunct	Known as the 'Apostle of the North', Bernard Gilpin, Rector of Houghton, established the village school in Houghton le Spring. He drafted the charter with John Heath of Kepier; and the two men were its first governors. John Heath was a London merchant who bought the site of the Hospital of St Giles of Kepier, next to Gilesgate, Durham. Their heirs became responsible for the school; a schoolhouse was erected on high ground north-east of the churchyard by Gilpin's will dated 17 October 1582. The school closed in 1922. The current Kepier School adopted the name in 1987.	
Sedgefield Grammar School			Defunct	Founded on Beacon Hill on 5 acres of land with only a field called Howle Hope for endowment of £2 12s.	
Wolsingham Grammar School	Wolsingham School	1614	Comprehensive Academy	Land was leased by the Bishop of Durham. (Note: the grammar school at Wolsingham, if it existed, was not recorded in Carlisle's Concise Description of 1818.)	

== Essex ==
Standard name	Other names	Foundation	Status now	Comments	References
Braintree Grammar School		1649	Defunct	A former draper and grocer of the town, James Coker, endowed the school in 1702. The founder was Ralph Diggin, of Lisle, Southampton who gave land to the master and fellows of Clare Hall, Cambridge to fund scholars.	
Brentwood Grammar School	Brentwood School, Essex	1558	Independent	Sir Anthony Browne was granted a licence by Queen Mary I.	
Chelmsford Grammar School		24 March 1551	Grammar school with academy status	Founded by letters patent at the request of Sir William Petre, Secretary of State, with distinguished local patrons Sir Walter Mildmay, Sir Henry Tirrell, and Henry Mildmay, whose involvement with the school lasted 400 years.	
Chigwell Grammar School	Chigwell School	13 April 1629	Independent	An indenture was ordered by Samuel Harsnet, Archbishop of York to found a grammar school and endow a master, with a remainder for extra food. The trustees included the local vicar and a parson of Loughton plus twelve "discreet Parishoners of Chigwell." "In the Principles of our Christian Religion According to the Order of the Book of Common Prayer...I strictly inhibit...upon penalty of Loss of his Place, that he grant no Otiums...." (Note: Otium literally means "hatred" Otium is Latin for leisure, idleness etc, but Play Days were interpreted as a sin and could be propitiated by work. Accordingly institutions encouraged variously hard work and fasting before Feast Days, Festivals and leave from school.) For example, discipline was firm so "That no scholar upon Pain of Whipping, do make Water within the Walls of the Court-Yard."	
Colchester Grammar School		1207	Grammar school with academy status	There was no endowment until the Reformation (1539). Furthermore, a charter was granted on 14 May 1574.	
Dedham Grammar School	Queen Elizabeth's Free School	1571	Defunct	By his will, 20 July 1571, William Littlebury, gentleman, bequeathed £20 p.a. off Ragmarsh Farm in the parishes of Bradfield and Wrabness for a schoolmaster. The charter of 14 May 1574 ordered the name to be changed to Queen Elizabeth's Free Grammar School. The master must be an Oxbridge graduate, and two scholars were sent to Cambridge. The school closed in 1889. The east end of schoolhouse was made of timber; and a brick west end was added 1723. The whole building had ceased to exist before 1923. The artist John Constable (1776–1837) attended the school.	
Earl's Colne Grammar School		1520	Defunct	Christopher Swallow, clerk, erstwhile Vicar of Messing, endowed the school with Pickstones Farm and Tumbletie Cottage in the parish of Sisted; and Potts, a cottage with land. Despite noble patronage of Aubrey de Vere, Earl of Oxford the deeds were never covered by statute. Closed in 1975.	
Felsted Grammar School	Felsted School	1564	Independent	Richard, Lord Rich, Lord Chancellor founded with "ample provision." The first three headmasters G. manning, M.Holbeach, and C.Glasscock made the school nationally famous. The chapel begun 1873 has been altered several times. The old premises were sold in 1894 and the prep school began. Ten years later a carpentry shop was added. In 1930 a huge fire destroyed much of the school. The old Guild Hall once housing the grammar is now used by the prep school. The Independent Schools Inspectorate rated the school "excellent" in all categories.	
Halsted Grammar School		1594	Defunct	Originally intended for Clavering, Dame Mary Ramsey endowed a schoolhouse with £40 p.a. for the education of 43 children within the town, three of whom were free scholars. The school closed in 1897, with the pupils transferring to Earls Colne Grammar School.	
Maldon Grammar School		2 March 1608	Defunct	founded by Ralph Breder, alderman of Corporation of Maldon bequeathed £300. The left the master's nomination to the feoffees, and later to the town's bailiffs. The Archdeacon of Rochester, Thomas Plume erected a schoolhouse on the medieval site of St Peter's church. He also donated almost his entire library to maintain a keeper, who was bonded not to steal. The school was granted a scholarship to Christ's College, Cambridge.	
Newport Grammar School	Newport Free Grammar School; Joyce Frankland Academy	1588	Comprehensive Academy	Joyce Franckland, was the widow of Robert Trapps, Goldsmith of London, a portionist of Great Tythe, she bequeathed two houses in London, and a tenement in Hertford valued at £23 10s. p.a. She also left a house in Philip Lane, Aldermanbury. Scholarships to Gonvil & Caius College, Cambridge.	
Saffron Walden Grammar School		1522	Defunct	The Vicar of Walden, Rev. John Leche was prepared in his will to found from 24 March 1514. Joan, Lady Bradbury granted a rent-charge on the manor of Willynghall Spayne as party of her contract with the "Treasurer and Chambreleyns of the Fraternitie or gilde of the Holy Trinite in the Parishe of Walden." It was later endowed by Sir William Dawson, and then by Sir Thomas Smith, the Elizabethan courtier. Closed in 1940.	

== Gloucestershire ==
Standard name	Other names	Foundation	Status now	Comments	References
Chipping Campden Grammar School	Chipping Campden School	1487	Comprehensive Academy	Founded by John Fereby (alias Varby). It was endowed with a moiety of the manor of Lynham, in County of Oxford, with a large Finis Close. Subsequently, sold for Barton on the Heath, Warwick and settled by a decree in chancery. Open "to all boys of the Parish" it had a fourth share in an Exhibition to Pembroke College, Oxford. Refounded in 1964 from amalgamations, it then went comprehensive in 1970. In 2013 it became a Co-Operative Trust.	
Cheltenham Grammar School	Pate's Grammar	1574	Grammar School with academy status	founded by Richard Pates Esq., with a schoolmaster in the bishop's nomination. Latterly eight Exhibitioners were granted to Pembroke College, Oxford.	
Cirencester Grammar School		1461	Defunct	Founded and built by Thomas Ruthal, Bishop of Durham, who was born at Cirencester, in 1508. By his will John Jones, gentleman, had left six houses for Masses to his soul. It was endowed with £7 p.a. on chantry lands dissolved and made over to the Commissioners Sir Walter Mildmay and Robert Keyleway, Esq. Now defunct; the school was closed in 1966	
Gloucester Grammar School	The King's School, Gloucester or The College	1410	Independent	Founded by King Henry IV in 1410, Case Grammar School is said to be one of the oldest schools in England to survive in its old form.	
Gloucester, Saint Mary de Crypt Grammar School	The Crypt School	1539	Grammar school with academy status	Foundation originated with Lady Joan Cooke; refounded on the dissolution of the monastery at Llanthony Secunda by the order of parliament.	
Northleach Grammar School		1559	Defunct	Founded by Hugh Westwood Esq., of Chedworth; seised of the rectory and parsonage in his lifetime, his will expressly conveyed a house, garden and close in trust, for the inhabitants of the town's purchase. Westwood's heir entered the estate and sued for it in chancery through a Bill of Complaint in Attorney-General v. Westwood. Closed c. 1904.	
Chipping Sodbury Grammar School			Defunct	Was settled by a decree of chancery in 166? on the surrounding villages of Old Sodbury, Chipping Sodbury and Wickwar.	
Tetbury Grammar School	Sir William Romney's School	c. 1600	Comprehensive Academy	Sir William Rumney, alderman and sheriff of London, founded the school, funded on the profits of fairs and markets in the town. George, Lord Berkeley of Berkeley Castle purchased the advowson, borough, manor and customs to permit the town's incorporation of the school.	
Tewkesbury Grammar School	Tewkesbury School; Tewkesbury Academy	1625	Comprehensive Academy	Founded by William Ferrers, citizen and mercer of London; and endowed by £20 p.a. A charter of William III in 1701 incorporated the body politic.	
Thornbury Grammar School	Marlwood School	1606	Academy	State-funded secondary school in Alveston	
Wickwar Grammar School		1684	Defunct	One story has Alexander Hosea, weaver, founding the school.	
Winchcombe Grammar School	The Royal Grammar School; The King's School	1562	Defunct	The visitor, Lord Chidiock Powlett, receiver-general brought the revenues to the Elizabethan Crown.	
Winchcombe, The Lady Chandos Grammar School		1622	Defunct	Founded by Lady Frances Chandos	
Wotton-under-Edge Grammar School	The Free Grammar School of the Lord Berkeley in Wotton-Under-Edge; Katharine Lady Berkeley's School	1384/5	Comprehensive Academy	Originally the foundation under royal licence of Lady Katherine Berkeley, widow, it miraculously escaped the Reformation, and survived. It was caught by "An Act for the Dissolution of Chantries" however, so a petition heard in Attorney-General v. John Smith (20 January 1622). It was finalised in the King's Bench by decree order of a "beneficial lease", and surrendered to letters patent (24 May 1625) in perpetuity. Rents were reserved for the master's stipend. Ordinances were made real by the Chancellor to the Bishop of Gloucester: well-endowed by several legal benefactors.	

== Hampshire ==
For Hampshire see County of Southampton.

== Herefordshire ==
Standard name	Other names	Foundation	Status now	Comments	References
Bosbury Grammar School		c. 1560	Defunct	Founded by Sir Rowland Morton of The Grange. It was endowed with £8 p.a. by the Receiver of Fee-Farm Rents on the manor of Wormbridge on about 30 acres. A desirable site for which local benefactor Richard Reed of Lugwardine founded an exhibition to Brasenose College, Oxford in 1676. In 1868 it was a National School under inspection (see: Gladstone's National reforms).	
Bromyard Grammar School	Queen Elizabeth High School, Bromyard	Since 1356	Comprehensive Academy	In 1394 a chantry school was founded. After the dissolution of the monasteries, the school was granted a charter for its refoundation as a boys' grammar school by Queen Elizabeth I. It was revived by the Goldsmiths Company (1851). In 1958, the Grammar School, which had been admitting boys and girls since 1914, combined with the secondary school established in 1961 and the school was opened as Bromyard County Secondary School in 1963. It was a Secondary Modern School by 1969; and it is now known as Queen Elizabeth School. In 1976, it became a comprehensive school for pupils aged 11 to 16.	
Colwall Grammar School	The Free Grammar School at Colwall Green	10 December 1612	Defunct	Founded by Humphrey Walwyn, citizen and Grocer of London, in pursuance of his will, "for the poor children of the parish and seven of the poorest children in Little Malvern to be taught freely". An endowment of £600 was left; and the will provided that two wardens would visit the school every three years. Non-classical, most of the 50 children attending in 1868 were under 10 years.	
Hereford Grammar School	Hereford Cathedral School	26 December 1384	Independent	Founded by Bishop Trellick in the cathedral close. A statute for the grammar school ordinances was enacted on 6 March 1583. The will of Dr Charles Langford (d. 1607), dean of Hereford "nominated four scholars...until the Mortmain can be procured." Six years later in 1613 two more scholarships were secured at Since 1636 Vicars Choral had call on school buildings, until new construction in the 1870s. Brasenose College, Oxford (1868) and St John's College, Cambridge held regular scholarships. See also Aylestone Business and Enterprise College.	
Kington Grammar School	Lady Hawkins' School	1632	Comprehensive; Academy	At the west end of Upper Hergest (about 5 km SW of Kington), Margaret, Lady Hawkins, widow, erected a schoolhouse on one acre. The school was endowed with 300 acres in the parish of Kington. Farm fee-rent of £270 p.a. for the master and usher.	
Kinnersley Grammar School	The Free School at Kinnersley		Defunct		
Ledbury Grammar School		1598	Amalgamated	Founded by Elizabeth Hall during Elizabethan era. Refounded in Upper Hall in 1923, amalgamated in 1978 with Ledbury County Secondary School and Canon Frome Secondary School to form John Masefield High School.	
Lucton Grammar School	Lucton School	9 December 1708	Independent	Founded by John Pierrepoint, citizen and vintner of London, by indenture. In 1709 an act of Parliament constituted the body corporate of governors from the City of London. ".. the benefits of the school may generally enjoyed by the sons of Yeomen..."	

== Hertfordshire ==
Standard name	Other names	Foundation	Status now	Comments	References
St Albans Grammar School	St Albans School	1309	Independent	Original statutes from Edward II's parliament. Refounded in 1539 when school moved to St Peter's Church, St Albans. A private act of Parliament, Bourman's School Act 1548 (2 & 3 Edw. 6. c. 14 Pr.), was obtained by Richard Boreman; but it was not formally a free grammar until a charter of 12 May 1553, it which it was empowered to receive rents to the value of £40 p.a. Charters followed in successive reigns, that enumerated the enfranchisement of three taverns, and its duties "towards the maintenance of The Free School."	
Aldenham Grammar School	Aldenham School	1597	Independent	founded by Richard Platt, citizen of London, former Master of the Worshipful Company of Brewers, from letters patent from Elizabeth I in 1596 as "Free Grammar school and Almshouses". The school was east of the almshouses, the master appointed by the Brewers Company; they gained a common seal to master and fellows of St John's College, Cambridge on 28 November 1601.	
Chipping Barnet Grammar School	Queen Elizabeth's School, Barnet	24 March 1573	Boys' grammar with academy status	After Dudley's petition to the Queen, the applicant Edward Underne was granted a charter to found a free grammar school "for instruction and bringing up boys...". There is a body corporate by perpetual succession.	
Berkhampstead Grammar School	Berkhamsted School	14 October 1541	Independent	Founded by John Incent, Dean of St Paul's, London and a native of Berkhamsted, by letters patent, it was duly incorporated, impleaded and granted a common seal. A handsome brick building was erected in the north-east of the churchyard. A chief master was appointed on 23 March 1545. The school was endowed to a value of £40 p.a. Visitor every third year was the warden of All Souls College, Oxford by a Decretal Order (1744); later subject to Lord Eldon's Charity Jurisdictional Commission (1814). The original school was amalgamated in 1997.	
Buntingford Grammar School	Freman College	1633	Comprehensive Academy	Founded by Mrs Elizabeth Freeman, widow of Aspeden Hall, and "the overplus" with nine acres in Great Munden. The Bishop of Salisbury, Dr. Seth Ward divided between the fellows of Christ's College, Cambridge on a generous foundation of £1,000 settled by payment for four scholarships of £12 p.a. from the Wimbush estate. Restricted to locals only, the scholars were nominated by Rector of Aspeden and Vicar of Layston.	
Hertford Grammar School	Richard Hale School	16 April 1617	Comprehensive Academy	Richard Hale, Esq., made 2 Guineas p.a. as schoolmaster in a profitable concern! the founder "pro eruditione et instructione Puerorum et Juvenum" (for the teaching and instruction of Boys and Youths) Hale acquired letters patent. His son and heir, Bernard Hale, S.T.P., created seven scholarships at Peterhouse, Cambridge. Viscount Melbourne took an interest in the appointment of governors. Founder was merchant Richard Hale, who wished to "erect a grammar school for the instruction of children in the Latin tongue and other literature in the town of Hertford". The original school building was in use for 313 years from 1617 to 1930, and still stands near to All Saints' Church. For most of its life the school was known as the "Hertford Grammar School" until 1967, when it was renamed to coincide with the 350th anniversary. Girls are introduced to a Sixth Form. Academy status was realised in 2013.	
Stansted Abbots Grammar School	Stanstead Abbotts Grammar School	10 November 1635	Defunct	Founded by Sir Edward Baesh for sons of the village inhabitants. The deed offered a rent-charge payable to the governors of Hertford grammar for a master on £20 pa. But under Endowed Schools Act 1869 the Baesh Scholarship Endowment scheme was split to support Ware and Hertford grammar schools. Premises in Cappell Lane are still extant and now a private residence.	
Stevenage Grammar School	Alleyne's Grammar School; Alleyne's School; The Thomas Alleyne Academy	1558	Comprehensive Academy	The school took the current name in 2013.	
Bishop Stortford Grammar School		1579	Defunct	Margaret, wife of wealthy merchant William Dane, of the Ironmongers Company was born in the town, so when William died he bequeathed £50 for endowment of poor school. Margaret (d.1579) left £2000 in her will to build a schoolhouse, as well as £5 p.a. for maintenance. A Latin and Writing school was attached to a growing library. Scholarships were sponsored to Cambridge. By the end of the 18th century the school however was defunct. Carlisle stated in his work '...no longer exists. The whole Establishment, together with the School-house is in ruins'.	

== Huntingdonshire ==
Standard name	Other names	Foundation	Status now	Comments	References
Godmanchester Grammar School		20 September 1558	Defunct	Richard Robins left the school money in his last will and testament. Premises are now a community centre. The school, after later life as a village 'National School', closed in 1948.	
Huntingdon Grammar School	Huntingdon Free Grammar School; Hinchingbrooke School	Recognised 1570	Comprehsnive Academy	An earlier school existed in the time of Henry II.	

== Kent ==
Standard name	Other names	Foundation	Status now	Comments	References
Ashford Grammar School	The Norton Knatchbull School	1630	Boys' grammar school with academy status	Founded 'a free school here and endowed' by Sir Norton Knatchbull (later the family of baronets and Lords Brabourne). In the school's deeds, dated from 22 February 1638, a master was salaried £30 pa. The school was built in 1635 west of the church (known as Dr Dilks Hall) on Church of England episcopalian doctrine. There were strong ties to Cambridge University, who prompted library building (1715). Academic studies prospered in the 18th century as the curriculum broadened (1760) into French, Maths, and accounting. Re-founded in 1878. The school moved to Hythe Road in 1881, but it was demolished and re-built in 1956. It changed its name in 1973 but still bears the Knatchbull shield.	
Biddenden Grammar School	John Mayne Church of England Primary School	1522	Maintained (State) Primary School	The school was founded by John Mayne, who lived in the parish.	
Canterbury Grammar School	The King's School, Canterbury	597 refounded 8 April 1541	Independent	Mission of St Augustine founded the School AD597 in Canterbury; was converted to a public school in the Victorian period and now predominantly boarding. The Independent Schools Inspectorate in 2017 stated it provided "outstanding academic results". The premises used for the junior school was donated in 1925 by Violet the widow of politician Lord Milner. The main school opened a sports hall in 1999 and a new music department in 2016.	
Charing Grammar School		28 September 1761	Defunct	The school was founded by Mrs Elizabeth Ludwell.	
Cranbrook Grammar School	Cranbrook School, Kent	1518	Co-educational State Grammar	"William Lynche to found a frescole howse for all the pour children of the towne..." in Richard Baker's will (1504). Simon Lynche and a yeoman of King's Armoury, John Blubery received a royal charter (1574) from Queen Elizabeth I for the endowment. Celebrated 500th anniversary in 2018 for which a full history was published by archivist, Peter Allen. OFSTED school is "outstanding".	
Feversham Grammar School	Queen Elizabeth's Grammar School, Faversham	10 December 1527	Voluntary-aided co-educational grammar school	Since its foundation in the 12th century there has always been a school in Faversham. The earliest grammar school (1420) was later endowed by John Cole before the Reformation by the Grace of Henry VIII from Ewell Farm. On petition the grammar school was successfully endowed to re-open in 1576. Mayor Henry Wreight (d.1840) endowed a commercial legacy in his will. The school merged with the local girls school, and became co-educational in 1967.	
Goudhurst Grammar School		1670	Defunct	John Horsmonden left £35 per year for a master, a 'pious and learned man' but no provision for school buildings. A further £5 per year was provided to teach the poor. Lands at Tenterden provided an income, but the school failed in 1833. A National School merger was discussed but went unfunded: one was built on the site of the old grammar school in 1875. Horsmonden's endowment was used for higher education purposes until liquidated in 1960s.	
Lewisham (Blackheath) Grammar School	Colfe's Grammar School; Colfe's School	1494	Independent	A chantry school at the Reformation, it was refounded in 1568 by Rev John Glyn; and later endowed by Abraham Colfe as a free grammar school in 1652.	
Maidstone Grammar School		1549	State-run Grammar School	The original Grey Friars Order School on Gabriel's Hill dates to 1348. In 1390s it moved to All Saints College by the church. In early 15th century it moved to Earl Street. Protector Somerset, from whom the town's corporation gained a reversion granted by a royal charter, officially founded the grammar school. By 1930 it was at Barton Road, Maidstone. In 2010-11 it acquired a Learning Centre and Sixth Form. The school reverted to entry at 13 in 1973 and a traditional House system was established in 2007. The school regularly sends pupils to Oxbridge.	
Rochester King's School		1541	Independent	Dates from the foundation of the Diocese of Rochester in 604, although according to tradition there was a school here when St Augustine founded it.	
New Romney Grammar School	Southland's Grammar School; John Southland's Community Comprehensive School; The Marsh Academy	c. 1610	Non-selective (secondary modern) with academy status	John Southland of New Romney endowed the school and almshouses for the poor; "and should teach from time to time two poor children to write and read the English tongue, and cast accoumpt, until they should come to the age of 14 years clearly". The schoolhouse was situated in St Nicholas near the church. The John Southland Trust scheme was renewed from 22 December 1916, and was renewed by parliament in 1923 "to go to poor children".	
Sandwich Grammar School	Sir Roger Manwood's School	1563	Grammar school with academy status	founded by Roger Manwood	
Sevenoaks Grammar School	Sevenoaks School	1432	Independent	Founded by William Sevenoke via a 1432 bequest.	
Sutton Valence Grammar School	Sutton Valence School	1576	Independent	Founded as a free grammar school by William Lambe, a master of the Clothworkers Company	
Tenterden Grammar School		1521	Defunct	Mayor John Mantell, grazier, of Kenchill (d.1702) endowed £200.	
The Free Grammar School in Tonbridge	Tonbridge School	1553	Independent	Founded in 1553 by Andrew Judde	
Wye Grammar School		1447	Defunct	Original foundation in 1447 by John Kempe. Refounded as a grammar school, 1627. Schoolroom is extant, known as 'The Latin School' 6 High Street, Wye.	

== Lancashire ==
Standard name	Other names	Foundation	Status now	Comments	References
Blackburn Grammar School	Queen Elizabeth's Grammar School	1509	Comprehensive Academy	Became direct grant from 1944, independent in 1976, joined the state school sector in 2014.	
Blackrod Grammar School	Rivington and Blackrod High School	1586	Comprehensive Academy	An original endowment in 1566, by James Pilkington, Bishop of Durham preceded John Holmes' foundation. Rivington and Blackrod Grammar Schools were amalgamated in 1875. In 1973 Rivington and Blackrod grammar schools amalgamated with Horwich County Secondary School to form the Rivington & Blackrod High School.	
Great Bolton Grammar School		1516	Independent	Endowed in 1524 by William Haigh of Wigan. Amalgamation in 1899 of Day School, High School for Girls with the High School for Boys.	
Burnley Grammar School		1552	Defunct	Founded by Gilbert Fairbank on closure of chantry schools by King Edward VI.	
Bury Grammar School		c. 1570	Independent		
Cartmel Grammar School	Cartmel Gatehouse Priory	1624	Defunct	The school was closed in 1790. It was founded in a former Augustinian priory building.	
Chorley Grammar School	Parklands High School	1611	Comprehensive Academy	The grammar school was founded William Hawkshead and Thomas Ainscow, the parish churchwardens. The high school was opened in 1962; it converted to academy status in 2012.	
Clitheroe Royal Grammar School		1554	Grammar School Academy	Founded in the names of the Catholic King Philip II of Spain and Queen Mary I, converted to academy status in 2011 out of the Girls Grammar (established 1958) and the Boys Grammar, which had amalgamated in 1985.	
Farnworth Grammar School		1715	Defunct	Closed in 1982.	
Hawkshead Grammar School		1585	Defunct	Founded by Edwin Sandys the school was closed in 1909; the building is now a museum.	
Lancaster Royal Grammar School		1469	Grammar School Academy	Founded by John Gardyner. An endowment was recorded in 1615, but the school was also documented in the corporation's books c. 1495.	
Leyland Grammar School		1524	Defunct		
Liverpool Grammar School	Liverpool Collegiate School	1840	Defunct	Opened in 1843 by William Gladstone MP, it achieved state grammar school status in 1907 on purchase by Liverpool City Council. Oulton High School merged (1943).	
Manchester Grammar School		1515	Independent	The grammar school became independent in 1976 on the abolition of the Direct Grant system.	
Middleton Grammar School		11 August 1572	Defunct	Founded by Alexander Nowell, D.D, Dean of St Paul's, London. Letters patent were granted from Lord Burghley on 24 June 1572 authorising the establishment by charter of foundation vested in the fellows of Brasenose College, Oxford. It became co-educational, and a new building erected in 1782.	
Prescot Grammar School	The Prescot School	1544	Comprehensive Academy		
Preston Grammar School			Defunct		
Rivington Grammar School	The Free Grammar School of Queen Elizabeth in Rivington; Rivington and Blackrod High School	13 May 1566	Comprehensive Academy	Situated in the parish of Bolton le Moors, Rivington grammar school was founded by letters patent on 13 May 1566 granted to James Pilkington, Bishop of Durham. Rivington and Blackrod Grammar Schools were amalgamated in 1875.	
Rochdale Grammar School		1 January 1565	Defunct	The school was founded on indenture granted by Matthew Parker, Doctor of Divinity, Archbishop of Canterbury.	
Whalley Grammar School		1549	Defunct	founded by King Edward VI with a small endowment of only 20 marks.	
Wigan Grammar School		11 January 1619	Defunct	James Leigh, gentleman, granted an indenture to trustees in land for the foundation of a grammar school.	
Winwick Grammar School		c. 1600	Defunct	Gwalter Legh, Esquire founded the grammar school near Warrington for a small endowment of only £10 marks per annum.	

== Leicestershire ==
Standard name	Other names	Foundation	Status now	Comments	References
Appleby Parva Grammar School	Sir John Moore Church of England Primary School	1697	Primary School	Founded by Sir John Moore MP, merchant of London. President of Christ's Hospital, he was a great benefactor. John Mould-Moore, who inherited by statute on 2 June 1702, endowed the estate with 228 acres. The large building was designed by Sir Christopher Wren; being 100 ft long, 50 ft wide, it was mentioned in Boswell's Life of Johnson. The headmaster had to have an MA from Oxford. The school was also associated with Swift and Pope.	
Ashby de la Zouch Grammar School	Ashby School	1567	Comprehensive Academy	Founded by Henry, Earl of Huntingdon who wrote the statutes in 1575. The head was paid from a "surplusage" out of the land rents. Trustees v. Rev. Lloyd was a famous case in chancery to determine pecuniary liability.	
Market Bosworth Grammar School	Dixie Grammar School	1593	Independent	Founded by Sir Wolstan Dixie, lord mayor of London. By his will the Skinners Company gained control; they endowed and built it from ashlar stone. Letters patent were issued on 11 May 1601 under common seal. Fellowships at Emmanuel, Cambridge to supply the masters. In Attorney-General, ex parte J Farmer, W Vincent, T Baker, v. Dixie family (1662) negligence and mismanagement was imputed against the Dixie family.	
Market Harborough Grammar School	Smith's Charity School; County Grammar School of Edward VII; Market Harborough Grammar School; Robert Smyth School; Robert Smyth Academy; Market Harborough Upper School	20 November 1614	Comprehensive Academy	Robert Smith, a citizen of London, founded a grammar school in his native town of Market Harborough. The school closed in 1892. The schoolroom, still extant is a prominent feature of Church Square, Market Harborough.	
Kibworth Grammar School	Beauchamp Grammar School; Beauchamp College	1450	Comprehensive Academy	A school was built in the close of Thomas Kilpeck.	
Leicester Grammar School		7 April 1573	Independent	Ancient statutes subscribed by Earl of Huntingdon. A charter was declared to convert the decayed church for £35: for 40 boarders in a corporation dwelling-house.	
Loughborough Grammar School		29 April 1495	Independent	Original foundation by Thomas Burton. A trust for a free school was endowed in 1597. Feoffees determined the rules for scholars.	
Melton Mowbray Grammar School	King Edward VII School, Melton Mowbray	1347	Defunct	The original foundation for Edward III, was refounded during the reformation. There were two schools, boys and girls, with poor scholars to Lincoln College, Oxford. The successor school closed in 2011	

== Lincolnshire ==
Standard name	Other names	Foundation	Status now	Comments	References
Alford Grammar School	The Free Grammar School of Queen Elizabeth I	1565	Grammar School; Academy	Deed from 1565, stone laid by Francis Stanning, merchant who endowed with £50. Encouraged by Lord Burghley. In the 19th century it also took boarders.	
Boston Grammar School		1554	Grammar School; Academy	Founded and endowed by Queen Mary I.	
Bourne Grammar School		1330	Grammar School; Academy	Re-founded again after the Reformation by William Trollope, later 2nd baronet of Casewick in the County of Lincoln.	
Butterwick Grammar School		2 November 1665	Maintained (state) Primary School	Founded by Anthony Pinchbeck, yeoman, endowed with lands of four surrounding parishes.	
Caistor Grammar School			Grammar School; Academy	Founded in the will of Francis Rawlinson, clerk, and Rector of St Nicholas, South Kelsey. The land belonged to Sir Edward Ayscough secured by licence of mortmain. Rawlinson bought the tithes for £130 on Clerk's Ale at Easter. Patronage passed to Boucherett family, and scholars to Jesus College, Cambridge.	
Gainsborough Grammar School		20 December 1630	Grammar School; Academy	Endowed by Queen Elizabeth I, and incorporated with lands, hereditaments and premises for the poor children of the town. Re-founded in 1795 after dereliction, by vicar, Rev Urquhart.	
Glanford Bridge Grammar School	Brigg Grammar School; Sir John Nelthorpe School	11 September 1669	Comprehensive; Community school	Endowed by a farm at Fulsby, and lands at Horncastle. Boys born in Brigg, and total of 80 pupils. Trustees used tythes of Market Rasen.	
Grantham Grammar School		1500	Grammar School; Academy	Founded by Richard Fox, Bishop of Winchester Indenture included President of Corpus Christi, Oxford, and William Disney of Norton Disney.	
Grimsby Grammar School		1547	Defunct	Founded by letters patent at The Chantry Farm for £40 5s 6d. There were subsequent trustees who paid benefices out of lands. There was a grammar school in Grimsby in 1329, with a later refoundation of 1547 in the reign of Edward VI.	
Holbeach Grammar School	George Farmer Secondary School; George Farmer Technology and Language College	12 July 1547	Amalgamated	Founded by George Farmer of St Andrew's, Holborn. A master was appointed "without any salary...". Amalgamated and now part of University Academy Holbeach, sponsored by the University of Lincoln	
Horncastle Grammar School		25 January 1571	Grammar School; Academy	Founded by letters patent with uncertain revenues from land threatened with inundation.	
Laceby Grammar School	Stanford School	25 June 1712	State primary school	Founded in pursuance of the will of Philip Stanford of Laceby,	
Lincoln Cathedral Chapter School	The Close Grammar School, Lincoln		Amalgamated	In 1584 it was united with the corporation school in Lincoln.	
Lincoln Grammar School	Lincoln Free School	1584	Amalgamated	An amalgamation of the City Free School and the Cathedral Chapter School	
Louth Grammar School	King Edward VI Grammar School, Louth	21 September 1552	Grammar School; Academy	Founded by letters patent. The St Mary's Church was converted as a schoolhouse. It was granted a charter (1702) by Queen Anne and Statutes and Ordinances (1796).	
Louth Park Grammar School		1139	Defunct	Abbey founded by Tanner, Bishop of Lincoln for Cistercians at Haverholm and dedicated to the Virgin. At Reformation the Louth Park Abbey estate was granted to Charles Brandon, 1st Duke of Suffolk.	
Moulton Grammar School		19 September 1560	Grammar School; Academy	Founded by will of John Harrox, yeoman, and endowed with land in Moulton and Whaplode.	
New Sleaford Grammar School	Carre's Grammar School; The Free and Common School	1 September 1604	Grammar School; Academy	Robert Carr, Esq of Aswardby was the founder	
Spalding Grammar School			Grammar School; Academy	Founded by John Gamblyn and John Blank by letters patent from Charles I. A local school, but no scholarships, among endowments was the Chapelry of Cowbit. The statutes (1681) equipped St John's, Cambridge to choose the master.	
Stamford Grammar School	Radcliffe's School, The Free Grammar School	1532	Independent	Medieval attempts made by Oxford to suppress schools at Stamford. St John's College built a magnificent schoolhouse; given by Matthew Bellot, secretary to Burghley. The lord appointed 24 scholars courtesy of the Earl of Exeter.	
Wainfleet Grammar School	Skegness Grammar School	c. 1484, William Wainfleet	Grammar School; Academy	Founded by William Waynflete, Bishop of Winchester, Lord Chancellor to Henry VI. Magdalen, Oxford bought and repaired the school buildings from 1755. It was patronised by the Society of Antiquaries, which wrote a book about the school in the 18th century. In 1933 Magdalen College School at Wainfleet closed and was relocated to newer and larger buildings at Skegness where it became Skegness Grammar School.	
Wragby Grammar School		1632	Defunct	By will of William Hansard, Esq land was conveyed to Thomas Grantham, Esq Lord of the manor of Standon, Wragby. For many years owned by the Sir Edmund Turnor's family.	

== London ==
Standard name	Other names	Foundation	Status now	Comments	References
Allhallows Barking Grammar School		1689	Defunct	Founded by James Hickson in Plough Yard, Seething Lane for 20 poor children of the parishes of Allhallows Barking and St John, Wapping.	
Charterhouse School		1349	Independent	Founded in 1611 by Thomas Sutton on the site of the old Carthusian priory. Since 1872 located at Godalming, Surrey.	
Christ's Hospital School	The Hospitals of Edward the Sixth, King of England, of Christ, Bridewell, and Saint Thomas the Apostle	26 June 1553	Independent	The House of The Greyfriars was endowed, and the cloisters donated by King Edward VI. The school was located at Newgate for over 350 years before moving to Hertford and eventually to Horsham in 1902.	
Mercers' Chapel Grammar School	The School of Saint Thomas of Acons in the Parish of St Michael Pater Noster Royal; Mercers' School	1447	Defunct	Founded by Henry VI, it was refounded by Sir Thomas Gresham on 28 September 1541, and endowed by the Mercers Company, with an act of Parliament. It was closed in 1959	
Merchant Taylors' School		1561	Independent	1561 - 1875, located in Suffolk Lane; 1875 - 1933 located in Charterhouse Square at site vacated by Charterhouse School; Since 1933 located in Hertfordshire near Northwood.	
St Paul's School, London		1103	Independent	Re-founded by Dean Colet in 1509. Re-located to Hammersmith in 1884. Re-located to Barnes in 1968.	
Westminster School		1370's	Independent	Refounded by Elizabeth I in 1560	

== Middlesex ==
Standard name	Other names	Foundation	Status now	Comments	References
Enfield Grammar School		1505	Comprehensive Academy	Originally Blossom's chantry c. 1470, John Carew (or Crowe) enfeoffed a freehold, Paynetts, for uses and purposes of a school "to teach children...to read Latin and English, and to understand Grammar, and to write their Latines according to the use and trade of Grammar Scholes."	
Hampton Grammar School	now Hampton School	7 March 1556	Independent	Founded in the will of Robert Hamonde of Harefield. By a loophole, his heir Robert was able to convey estate to Francis Newdegate, Esq. £3 p.a. paid to vicar to teach.	
Harrow Grammar School	now Harrow School	19 February 1571	Independent	Founder John Lyon "used to give and pay for the teaching of thirty poor Children...until said building finished...." Letters patent of Queen Elizabeth I granted; followed by statutes (18 February 1590), which constituted the governors as a body corporate. £5 towards two scholars at Gonville and Caius College, Cambridge. In the case of Attorney-General v. Dixie, school governors became subject to removal in fraud cases.	
Highgate Grammar School	now Highgate School	6 April 1565	Independent	Founded by Sir Roger Cholmeley, knight, Lord Chief Justice, for the education of poor boys. Other governors included Sir William Hewett, Richard Martin, and Aldermen Roger Carew, Richard Heywood, Richard Hodges, and Jasper Cholmeley, who made the school a body corporate.	

== Monmouthshire ==
Standard name	Other names	Foundation	Status now	Comments	References
Abergavenny Grammar School	King Henry VIII School, Abergavenny	24 July 1542	Comprehensive		
Llandeilo Cresseney Grammar School		1654	Defunct	A Free Grammar School was founded in the Llantilio Crossenny village, on 10 August 1654, by James Powell, gentleman of Cymmerau. In 1924 a history of the grammar school was published by local historian Joseph Bradney.	
Monmouth Grammar School	Monmouth School and Haberdashers' Monmouth School	c. 1613	Independent	Haberdashers' Company	
Usk Grammar School		1621	Defunct	Founded by Roger Edwardsin 1621 the school closed in 1956. The school premises in Maryport Street are Grade II listed and currently house a Youth Services centre.	

== Norfolk ==
Standard name	Other names	Foundation	Status now	Comments	References
Aylesham Grammar School		1564		The manor's medieval foundation belonged to Edward III. (Note: an apputenance to the Royal Demesne. The King was the Tenant-in-Chief meaning he had total feudal authority over his personal demesne.) Refounded by Robert Jannys, mayor of Norwich in 1564, and endowed with £10, paid by the city's Treasurer; scholarships were endowed at Corpus Christi College, Cambridge.	
Harleston Grammar School	Harleston Sancroft Academy	1688	Comprehensive Academy	The school was first established by Archbishop William Sancroft, who by deed on 25 June 1688 granted £54 a year to Emmanuel College, Cambridge to pay a clergyman to teach in Harleston. Sancroft had to gain permission from the monarch James II to found the school.	
Hingham Grammar School		1727		Founded by William Parlett, before moving to the present site in Hardingham Street. The old grammar school is a listed building (1977). A Congregational chapel was added in 1836.	
Holt Grammar School	Gresham's School	1555	Independent	International Baccalaureate School	
King's Lynn Grammar School	King Edward VII School, King's Lynn	1510	Comprehensive Academy	Sports college	
Norwich Grammar School	King Edward VI's Grammar School, now Norwich School	1547	Independent		
Scarning Grammar School		1604		In 1604 a local farmer William Seckar left his house and land to his wife Alice for so long as she should survive, but stipulated that on her death the income from the estate should be used for "maintenance of one free school, to be kept for ever in the said house, while the world endure, in Scarning."	
Snettesham Grammar School		1708	Defunct	Founded by the will of Anthony Hall, yeoman of Snettesham, on five acres put in trust for 20 poor boys of the parish. In 1920 the school was sold for demolition and its carrstone; only the old sanatorium remained.	
Thetford Grammar School		631; 1566	Independent	Refounded by Sir Richard Fulmerston, a Roman Catholic knight who was an MP, and with the patronage of the Duke of Norfolk. Amalgamated with girls grammar in 1975 before independence in 1981.	
North Walsham Grammar School	Paston College	1 October 1606	Sixth Form College	Founded by Sir William Paston, a notable merchant. In 1766 a new building. The school later amalgamated with the girls' grammar school. It became voluntary aided in 1953, and voluntary controlled in 1971. It became a sixth form college in 1984.	
Little Walsingham Grammar School		1639	Defunct	Founded in 1639 by Richard Bond	
Wymondham Grammar School		1637	Defunct	Founded in 1637 by Sir John Sedley. A new grammar school of the same name was established in 1951 and has now become Wymondham College	

== Northamptonshire ==
Standard name	Other names	Foundation	Status now	Comments	References
Aynhoe Grammar School		1620	Defunct	Founded by the will of Mrs Mary Cartwright, her heirs were enabled to appoint the schoolmaster. Twenty-five scholars and ten poor children survived on only a £20 annual rent-charge.	
Blakesley Grammar School		1669		Founded on about 70 acres in Blakesley Field by the will of William Foxley. The Rectors of Braden and Maidford and the vicar of the village of Blakesley were the trustees. A £90 rent with £15 land values. The school between 20 and 30 schools at first.	
Blissworth Grammar School	Roger Wake's Chauntre and Free Scole	1548	Defunct	Lady Elizabeth Wake built a school on chantry land. It was endowed with lands and tenements in the county of £12 p.a. Wake controlled the mastership.	
Brackley Grammar School	Magdalen College School, Brackley	1153	Comprehensive; Academy	A medieval Earl of Leicester held a school in the hospital at Brackley, but Lord Lovell disposed of it to the President of Magdalen College, Oxford. It was indemnified by the trustees of the diocese of Lincoln. After the chantry was also transferred to Magdalen, the fellows eventually endowed a free school in 1549; the college acted as visitor.	
Daventry Grammar School		1576	Defunct	founded by William Parker of Daventry, a wealthy London merchant. By 1600 there was a fifty-acre establishment. It was originally situated in New Street, before being moved in 1937. Closed in the 1980s it merged with the Secondary Modern.	
Findon Grammar School		1542	Defunct	The Feee School at Findon was founded by Richaed Waltee, Citizen of London, and a native of this place, who, in 1542, gave £500. for building a Free School, and maintaining a Master and Usher.	
Fotheringhay Grammar School			Defunct	Endowed by the Elizabethan grant, distinguished courtiers endowed the grammar school, and appointed a nominee as schoolmaster. Local children could go free. Closed in 1859	
Guilesborough Grammar School	Guilsborough Grammar School	1668	Defunct	founded by the deeds of Sir John Langham. Ten trustees and the heirs of the founder were granted the right of appointing the schoolmasters. Fifty children from the local townships were allowed to attend. From the start there were no free scholars but seven boarders.	
Higham Ferrers Grammar School		1422	Defunct	Founded by Henry Chichele, Archbishop of Canterbury and Lord Chancellor to King Henry V by letters patent. Refounded in 1543. About forty children of the parish were taught here.	
Northampton Grammar School	Northampton School for Boys	1542	Comprehensive; Academy	a deed granted by Thomas Chipsey founded by which the corporation was appointed to superintend the appointment of a school master. An usher was endowed in 1689 to teach Latin; and the city corporation limited the number of free scholars to twenty-five.	
Oundle Grammar School	Oundle School; Laxton Grammar School	1556	Independent	Founded by Sir William Laxton with an almshouse. The Grocers Company appointed the schoolmaster and usher. Taylor's Exhibition was paid in default to the head boy because there were no scholars to claim it.	
Peterborough Grammar School	The King's (The Cathedral) School	1541	Comprehensive; Academy		
Preston Capes Grammar School					
Rothwell Grammar School		1427	Defunct		
Towcester Grammar School	Sponne School	1430	Comprehensive Academy		
Wellingborough Grammar School		1595	Independent		

== Northumberland ==
Standard name	Other names	Foundation	Status now	Comments	References
Allendale Grammar School		1700	Defunct	Founded at St Brides Hill, and built in 1704. endowments of £250 to found a grammar school on the west side of East Allendale.	
Alnwick Grammar School	The Duke's County Middle School; The Duke's Boys’ Grammar School	1810	Amalgamated	Founded in 1810 by the Duke of Northumberland. In 1979 at the time of secondary reorganisation, the school together with Alnwick Secondary Modern School, Seahouses Secondary Modern School, Glendale County Secondary School and St Mary's RC Secondary Modern School was integrated within The Duchess's Community High School	
Haydon Bridge Grammar School	Shaftoe Trust Grammar School	1685	State primary school (academy)	Founded in 1685 by the Rev. John Shaftoe. The school is now the Wise Shaftoe Trust Academy.	
Hexham Grammar School	Queen Elizabeth High School	1599	Comprehensive Academy	The royal charter was followed by an additional endowment in 1684. The town's Elizabethan Hallgate was sold in 2012.	
Morpeth Grammar School	The King Edward VI School, Morpeth	1550	Comprehensive Academy	refounded by William Turner	
Newcastle-upon-Tyne Grammar School	Royal Grammar School	1545	Independent	Founded adjacent to the cathedral by Thomas Horsley, merchant and mayor of Newcastle; granted an Elizabethan charter. Moved to Jesmond in 1906.	
Rothbury Grammar School	Rothbury Free Grammar School; Thomlinson's School; Dr Thomlinson Church of England Middle School	1720	Community School; Middle School		
Stamfordham Grammar School		1663		Stamfordham Grammar School was founded and endowed by Sir Thomas Widdrington in 1663	

== Nottinghamshire ==
Standard name	Other names	Foundation	Status now	Comments	References
Mansfield Grammar School	Queen Elizabeth's Academy; Queen Elizabeth's Grammar School (QEGS)	1561	Comprehensive; Academy		
Newark Grammar School	Magnus Church of England Academy	21 February 1531	Comprehensive; Academy	Founded by an indenture of Thomas Magnus.	
Normanton Grammar School	The Freeston Academy; Outwood Academy Freeston	16th Century	Comprehensive; Academy		
Nottingham Grammar School	Nottingham High School	1382	Independent	Founded by "Scolemaystre" William Adbolton during the reign of Richard II (1377 - 1399) The free grammar school was re-established in 1512 by Sir Thomas Lovell at Bellar Gate.	
East Retford Grammar School	King Edward VI Grammar School; Retford Oaks Academy	1551	Comprehensive; Academy		
Southwell Grammar School	The Minster School, Southwell	23 June 1512	Comprehensive; Academy	There had been a chantry and choral school at the Minster since 956 AD. The Free Grammar Collegiate chapter was founded by Robert Batemanson by charter from Henry VIII.	
Tuxford Grammar School	Read Grammar School	1669	Defunct	Founded from a bequest made by Charles Read in 1669. Closed 1915.	

== Oxfordshire ==
Standard name	Other names	Foundation	Status now	Comments	References
East Adderbury Grammar School	The Free Grammar School at East Adderbury	1589	Defunct	Founded in 1589 by a bequest made by Christopher Rawlins. The current village primary school is named Christopher Rawlins Church of England Primary School. There was previously the East Adderbury Boys' Church of England School, a successor of the grammar school.	
Steeple Aston Grammar School		1639	Defunct	Samuel Radcliffe of Brasenose College, Oxford and rector of Steeple Aston founded the school in 1639. By the end of the 19th century it had become a Church of England elementary school. The building is now a private residence.	
Banbury Grammar School	St John's Hospital School, Banbury	13th Century	Defunct	The Hospital of St John was a 13th-century foundation, The scholarship became recognised in the 16th century under schoolmaster John Stanbridge who was appointed in 1501.	
Burford Grammar School	Burford School	1571	Comprehensive Academy		
Bampton Grammar School		1653	Defunct	Robert Vesey of Chimney bequeathed in 1635 £300 for the founding of a school at Bampton. The school opened in 1653. The building is now used as a community centre.	
Charlebury Grammar School		1675	Defunct	Ann Walker spinster of London in 1667 made provision in a bequest 'to make a certaine house in the said town [Charlbury] called the Towne house (and theretofore used for a school house) fitt for a free schoole and for the habitation of a master'. The school opened in 1675 and closed in 1909.	
Dorchester-on-Thames Grammar School	Dorchester Free School	1652	Defunct	John Fettiplace of Swinbrook, the lay impropriator of Dorchester Abbey, was the founder in 1652. In 1858 the school became the village elementary school.	
Ewelme Grammar School		1437	State primary school (Church of England)	Founded by William de la Pole, 4th Earl of Suffolk, as an almshouse with a teacher. The school advises that it has the oldest school building in the UK still in use as a state school.	
Henley Grammar School	Henley College	1604	Sixth Form College	Only Sixth Form college in the county	
Abingdon School	Roysse's School (until the 1960s)	1256, Benedictine monks	Independent		
Magdalen College School		1480, Bishop William Waynflete	Independent	Became a Direct Grant school in 1949; became independent by 1976.	
Chipping Norton Grammar School		1450	Defunct	Became a National (Church of England) elementary school in 1859.	
Thame Grammar School	Lord Williams's School	1570	Comprehensive Academy	The school opened in 1570, having been founded at the bequest of John Williams, 1st Baron Williams of Thame, after his death in 1559.	
Watlington Grammar School	Successor institution is Icknield Community College (1956)	1665	Amalgamated	Endowed in 1665 by Thomas Stonor as a grammar school for boys, and in 1731 Dame Alice Tipping of Ewelme gave a further endowment to increase the number of pupils.	
Witney Grammar School	The Henry Box School	1660	Comprehensive Academy	The school was founded in 1660 by grocer Henry Box in his hometown after becoming a successful businessman in London.	
New Woodstock Grammar School		1585	Defunct		

== Rutland ==
Standard name	Other names	Foundation	Status now	Comments	References
Oakham Grammar School	Oakham School	1584	Independent	Robert Johnson founded (two) free grammar schools in the reign of Queen Elizabeth I.	
Uppingham Grammar School	Uppingham School	1584	Independent	Robert Johnson founded (two) free grammar schools in the reign of Queen Elizabeth I.	

== Shropshire ==
Standard name	Other names	Foundation	Status now	Comments	References
Bridgnorth Grammar School	Bridgnorth Endowed School (1974)	1503	Comprehensive Academy	Founded by Sir Rowland Hayward, judge, and others for the corporation of the town on chantry revenues of St Leonard's church of £8 p.a.	
Donington Grammar School		1627		Founded by Thomas Alcocke and endowed with £13 6s 8d p.a. (20 marks. Additional funds from Richard Stevenson's will (1658) on lands at Arleston "with an annuity for a school at Wroxeter, where the school was originally maintained." Master's appointment vested in the Earl of Darlington.	
Market Drayton Grammar School	The Free Grammar School of St Mary's Hall, Drayton-in-Hales; The Grove School (1965)	6 November 1556	Comprehensive Academy	Founded by Sir Rowland Hill, knight, citizen and alderman of London, was endowed with £20 for master and usher. At his death the school was supported by the lord of the manor and the Vicar of Drayton.	
Halesowen Grammar School	The Earls High School (1972)	1652	Comprehensive Academy	Founded by a commission of chancery around 1653, endowed with lands valued at £130 p.a.	
Ludlow Grammar School		1552	Sixth form college	Originally a King Edward VI foundation, entry was restricted to those who passed a Latin test, the school being "for erudition of Youth in the Latin Tongue". Endowed in 1607 by Charles Langford, Dean of Hereford, in the sum of £53 4s. p.a. Educated four boys wearing black gowns. (Note: Radley College maintains a tradition of black gowns to this day.) The school closed and merged in 1967, before conversion to a tertiary sector college, now Ludlow College.	
Newport (Shropshire) Grammar School	Haberdasher Adams' Grammar School	27 November 1656	State grammar with academy status	Founded by William Adams, and endowed with a capital messuage called Knighton Grange, lands, tenements, and hereditaments in Knighton and Adbaston in Staffordshire; and Woodease in Shropshire. At the Restoration a sum of £5 was granted out of Crown land revenue in addition to the 21-year lease at £175 p.a. derived from Adams estate.	
Oswestry Grammar School	Oswestry Free Grammar School	1407	Independent	Davy Holbeche MP, lawyer, High Steward of Oswestry, "who gave £10 to it", founded and endowed with his wife Guinevere, in the reign of Henry IV. A Bishop's Inquisition on 17 Sept 1635 before the Bishop of St Asaph and Sir Robert Eyton, Knt, .	
Shrewsbury Grammar School	Shrewsbury School	1552, Edward VI	Independent	The collegiate churches of St Mary and St Chad were dissolved for the maintenance of a grammar school. Founded by Hugh Edwards, mercer of London and Richard Whitacre, Bailiff of Shrewsbury, they acquired the tithes of Astley, Sansaw, Clive, Leaton and Almond Park and the property of the two churches, an endowment of £20 p.a.	
Wellington Grammar School		1549	Defunct	The founding Commissioners directed that a master be maintained from the proceeds of the Receiver of Court of Augmentations.	
Wem Grammar School	Thomas Adams School	1650	Comprehensive Academy	Sir Thomas Adams.	
Whitchurch Grammar School	Sir John Talbot's School	1550	Comprehensive Academy	Sir John Talbot.	

== Somerset ==
Standard name	Other names	Foundation	Status now	Comments	References
Bath Grammar School	King Edward's School, Bath	1553	Independent	Founded as the Free Grammar School of Edward VI at Bath.	
Bridgwater Grammar School		1561		Elizabeth I granted the parish tithes on to a charge of £6 13s. 4d., for a master's maintenance. At these demise circa 1620, the Crown granted to Philips & Morris letters patent for the same sum, who thereafter sold the said patent to the Corporation of Bridgewater. The appointment of the Master lay with the Bishop of Bath and Wells	
Bristol Grammar School	The City of Bristol Free Grammar School	1532	Independent	St Bartholomew's Hospital was conveyed by executors of Robert Thorne, Sir Thomas West and Lord de la Warre to the City of Bristol to erect a free grammar school.	
The College Grammar School, Bristol				Founded and endowed in the Lower College Green	
Redcliff Grammar School, Bristol	Queen Elizabeth's Free Grammar and Writing School; Redcliffe Endowed Boys' School; St Mary Redcliffe and Temple School	30 June 1571	Comprehensive Academy	Founded and endowed in the east end of Saint Mary's Crypt, Redcliff Church. Redcliffe Boys' School merged with Temple Colston School in 1969, creating the co-educational St Mary Redcliffe and Temple school as a comprehensive voluntary aided school.	
Bruton Grammar School	King's School, Bruton	1520	Independent	Richard FitzJames, Bishop of London, Sir John FitzJames LCJ and Dr. John Edmondes, clerk. Refounded under charter of King's Licence in c. 1550 by William Gilberte, last Abbot of Bruton Monastery. Endowed of schoolhouse on an acre adjoining the tenements of Bruton High Street, acquired by said Sir John, lord of the manor valued at £11 5s. p.a.	
Crewkerne Grammar School		1499	Defunct	John de Combe was the original founder. Refounded and endowed during the Reformation by Dr Hody and others c. 1550, and as free grammar school refounded in 1577. Rev. William Owsley, Rector of Puckington founded four exhibitions to Oxford University (see also Ilminster). The school closed in 1904; the building is used as a municipal church hall.	
Frome Grammar School	The Free Grammar School at Frome in the Forest of Selwood	c. 1550	Defunct	Founded during the reign of Edward VI and endowed with £6 p.a. and then a further £5 p.a.	
Ilminster Grammar School		18 May 1550	Defunct	Humphry Walrond of Sea, Ilminster and Henry Greenfylde founded and endowed with a schoolhouse and leasehold estates. 17th-century endowment from the Manor of Swanage. Four exhibitions to Wadham College, Oxford were available if not taken up by Crewkerne. The school closed in 1971.	
Langport Grammar School	Successor school is Huish Episcopi Academy	1670	Comprehensive Academy	Founded by Thomas Gillett, and endowed with land in Isle Abbots to value of £70 p.a..	
Martock Grammar School		1661	Defunct	Founded by William Strode, lord of the manor of Martock, endowed with house and garden for £12 p.a. in perpetuity. The lordship demised later into a sinecure.	
Taunton Grammar School		1522	Defunct	Founded by Richard Foxe, Bishop of Winchester and Lord Privy Seal endowed with a small manor and commodious master's house. Closed 1870. Today building is Taunton's Municipal Hall.	
Wells Grammar School	Wells Cathedral School	1180	Independent		

== County of Southampton ==
Carlisle referred to Hampshire as Southampton.

Standard name	Other names	Foundation	Status now	Comments	References
Alresford Grammar School	Perins School	1698	Comprehensive Academy	Henry Perin founded and purchased the school ground. Endowment of arable land under trustees.	
Alton Grammar School	Eggar's School	1641	Comprehensive Academy	Founded at Holyborne, High London Road by John Eggar of Montgomery in the Parish of Crondall, in the County of Southampton by a private act of Parliament, John Eggar's Free School Act 1640 (16 Cha. 1. c. 7 Pr.). Fourteen freeholder feoffees in the Hundred of Alton managed the school, which opened on 11 April 1642 under the first master Rev. Henry Welsted.	
Andover Grammar School	John Hanson Community School	1569	Comprehensive Community School	Founded by John Hanson of Andover, endowed with £200 "for the founding and towards the maintenance of a Free Schoole, in this Towne..." on land donated by Richard Blake.	
Basingstoke Grammar School	Queen Mary's School for Boys, Basingstoke	1556	Sixth Form College	A chantry school was converted to a grammar school in the reign of Mary I. A school and free chapel were founded by Bishop Fox and Sir John, Lord Sandes under licence to King Henry VIII. Through a process of amalgamations and transfers the current institution is the Queen Mary's College, Basingstoke.	
Godshill Grammar School	The Free Grammar School at Godshill on the Isle of Wight; Godshill Primary School	1615	State Primary School	Founded by Sir Richard Worsley, Bart., and endowed with The Chantry House for a master and two acres and £11 6s. 8d. towards the master's support in addition to Philip Andrews £5 (1593), and John Rice 13s. 4d. in 1608.	
Gosport Grammar School		17th century	Defunct	Founded and endowed by Lady Clancarty, a dwelling-house adjoining Lower South Street and the Wavil (later known as Weevil) brewhouse. The school went into decline after Lord Clancarty's estates were forfeited by the Crown. The early endowed school has no connection with the 20th-century Gosport County Grammar School.	
Newport Grammar School	King James I Grammar School (adopted in 1954)	c. 1618	Defunct	30 acres of meadow at Hunny Hill north of Lukely Brook were enclosed by the Earl of Southampton and appropriated to the school's benefit. Endowed by the Gentlemen of the Island in conjunction with the Corporation of Newport. The school (under the name of King James I Grammar School) closed in 1969.	
Portsmouth Grammar School		1732	Independent	William Smith MD. (died 11 February 1732) left an endowment in his will to Christ Church, Oxford to found a school, now let at £200 p.a.	
Southampton Grammar School	King Edward VI School, Southampton	4 June 1553	Independent	When William Capon died in 1550 he left a will endowment for a new grammar school in St Mary's parish, Southampton to be founded by letters patent. It was originally endowed with £10 p.a. from the corporation on a site at Winkle Street.	
Winchester College		1373	Independent	Founded by William of Wykeham, the school opened on 1 Sept 1373 under Master Richard de Herton "to instruct diligently in Grammatical learning as many poor scholars as the bishop should send him...". Winchester Society was founded in 1376, the warden of which was fellow of Merton College, Oxford. The foundation included 70 scholars. On 5 March 1380 he founded New College, Oxford: "Wynchester in Oxenford". Refounded in 1547. By the 16th century it was virtually an endowed grammar school for the city of Winchester, with about 100 commoners enrolled.	

== Staffordshire ==
Standard name	Other names	Foundation	Status now	Comments	References
Brewood Grammar School		1553	Middle School (Brewood CE Middle Academy)	A chantry school in the diocese of Lichfield; it was refounded in 1553 after the Dissolution of the Monasteries.	
Dilhorne Grammar School	Dilhorne Free Grammar School	1533	State primary school (Dilhorne Endowed CE Primary School)	The early foundation was connected with the Earl of Huntingdon. Successor school is Dilhorne Endowed C.E. Primary School	
Lichfield Grammar School	King Edward VI School, Lichfield	1495	Comprehensive	Bishop Smythe founded the free grammar school as patron of St John's Church. Endowed on 15 Sept 1555 by Dr Richard Walker, Dean of Chester, gave land and houses at Elmhurst and Curborough, value of £50 p.a. for a master and usher.	
Newcastle-under-Lyme Grammar School	Through amalgamation Newcastle-under-Lyme School	1692	Independent	John Cotton of Alkington in 1692, in the parish of Whitchurch, Shropshire, by his will gave £100 "for the maintenance of a school."	
Rolleston Grammar School		c. 1520	Defunct	Founded by Robert Sherborne(a native of the village), Bishop of Chichester endowed with £10 p.a. There is an extant school house dating from 1638 used as a village community centre	
Rugeley Grammar School	The Free Grammar School at Rudgeley; Fair Oak Academy; The Hart School	Stated by Carlisle as unknown	Amalgamated	Carlisle mentions earliest available documentation being dated 1609. The grammar school closed in 1967.	
Stafford Grammar School	The Public Free Grammar School of King Edward VI in Stafford	10 December 1550	Independent	Founded on 6 January 1546, devised in Robert Lees will. Refounded 1982 as an independent day school.	
Stone Grammar School	Alleyne's High School; Alleyne's Academy	1558	Comprehensive Academy	Founded pursuant to the will of Thomas Alleyne (died 1558), endowed with 20 Marks p.a., vested in the master, fellows, and scholars of Trinity College, Cambridge.	
Tamworth Grammar School	Landau Forte Academy	1588	Comprehensive Academy	Queen Elizabeth's boys grammar school, it amalgamated with Secondary Modern to form a Queen Elizabeth's Mercian Comprehensive school in 1979, before converting to academy status in 2011.	
Uttoxeter Grammar School	Thomas Alleyne's High School	1558	Comprehensive Academy	Pursuant to the will of Thomas Alleyne, endowed with 20 Marks p.a., vested in the master of Trinity College, Cambridge. The original number of boys was 14. Academy status since 2015.	
Walsall Grammar School	Queen Mary's Grammar School, Walsall	1554	Grammar School; Academy	George and Nicholas Hawe endowed the lands of the parishes of Walsall, Tipton and Norton, Staffordshire from dissolved chantries, with an income arising of £400 p.a and some coal mines. The boys' grammar school has opted for academy status.	
Wolverhampton Grammar School		22 September 1515	Independent	Founded by Sir Stephen Jenyns, knight and alderman of London, "for the instruction of Youth in good Morals and Learning...for the better sustenation of a Master, and also an Usher... for other necessary Charities there to be performed."	

== Suffolk ==
Standard name	Other names	Foundation	Status now	Comments	References
Beccles Grammar School	Fauconberge Grammar School	1713	Defunct	Founded under the will of Rev. Henry Fauconberge, LL.D. from a messuage, farm and lands in Corton, and Flixton in the County of Suffolk. The school closed in 1926.	
Botesdale Grammar School		1560's	Defunct	Founded near Eye, Suffolk by Sir Nicholas Bacon, 1st Baronet, of Redgrave.	
Bungay Grammar School	Bungay High School	1575	Comprehensive Academy	In 1565, Lionel Throckmorton of Bungay, endowed a new building on Earsham street; and funded scholarship to Emmanuel, Cambridge. A deed of 20 April 1591 belonging to Rev Thomas Popeson, MA, fellow of King's College Cambridge and the Master of Bungay granted lands; he founded ten scholarships at Emmanuel for the grammar school.	
Bury St Edmunds Grammar School	King Edward VI School, Bury St Edmunds	1550	Comprehensive	An amalgamation with the two Silver Jubilee Schools.	
Clare Grammar School		1669	Defunct	Founded by William Cadge, yeoman, who by his will, bequeathed his farm, Bochards, in the Parish of Barnardiston, County of Suffolk of 55 acres. It was then occupied by Matthew Price, rented at £28 p.a. for the school's endowment.	
Hadleigh Grammar School		1382	Defunct	The grammar school was first mentioned in the reign of Richard II, when a priest John Catour was given mastership.	
Ipswich School	Ipswich Grammar School; Queen Elizabeth's Grammar School, Ipswich	before 1477	Independent	On 2 January 1482, Bailiff Richard Felaw, Portman, and MP gave his houses and lands by will for the master's use. In 1524 Thomas Wolsey alienated Felaw's land for his new foundation at Christ Church, Oxford. Granted a charter by Elizabeth I in 1566.	
Kelsale Grammar School			Defunct	The Charity Estate (1765) endowed by a deed of trust with messuages, land and hereditaments in parishes of Kelsale, Carlton, Middleton with Fordley and Peasenhall, Suffolk.	
Lavenham Grammar School		1647	Defunct	Founded by Richard Peacock, Esq., with £5 p.a. charged on Samfords estate in the parish of Little Waldingfield. The school closed in 1887.	
Needham Market Grammar School	Theobalds Grammar School	1611	Defunct	Sir Francis Theobald of Barking and Needham Market owned the lands on which Theobalds Grammar School was built. The manor was originally Barking-cum-Needham before it became a market town.	
Redgrave Grammar School		1577	Defunct	Founded by Sir Nicholas Bacon, Knt., Lord Keeper, endowed with rent charge of £2 12s. 6d. p.a., and endowed by Corpus Christi College, Cambridge with six scholarships with an annuity of £20, out of the manors of Studdye and Burningham, Norfolk.	
Stoke Grammar School		1547	Defunct	Founded by Matthew Parker DD (who later became Archbishop of Canterbury) at the dissolution of the local chantry school, "for the instruction of Youth in Grammar and the study of Humanity"; later refounded. The Grammar School is not to be confused with Stoke College originally a medieval seminary and now an independent school adopting the name in 1954.	
Sudbury Grammar School		1491	Defunct	Founder William Wood was master of The College of St Gregory in that parish, endowed with farm of 90 acres.	
Woodbridge Grammar School		1577	Independent	Elizabethan foundation for the relief of the parish poor. Founded in 1577 by Thomas Arnott. Refounded in 1662 by Robert Marryott, Francis Burwell and Dorothy Seckford.	

== Surrey ==
Standard name	Other names	Foundation	Status now	Comments	References
Camberwell Grammar School	Wilson's Grammar School; Wilson's School	29 September 1615	Grammar School; Academy	Edward Wilson, clerk founded by letters patent one grammar school at Camberwell.	
Farnham Grammar School	Farnham College	Before 1611	6th Form College	Endowed by Rev. John Harding D.D., President of Magdalen College, Oxford by his will on 31 August 1611.	
Royal Grammar School, Guildford		3 November 1509	Independent	Robert Beckingham, citizen and grocer of London bequeathed a messuage and garden by Castle Ditch, his lands and tenements at Bromley, Kent, and Newington, Surrey [both now London]. Letters patent granted to "The Mayor and Approved Men of Guildford" on 27 January 1553.	
Kingston Grammar School		26 April 1547	Independent	Demised Carthusian priory, London, to Richard Taverner for 21 years from September 1538 at £14 p.a. Letters patent granted by the Court of Augmentation at Westminster, 17 May 1564.	
Saint Olave's Grammar School		27 July 1570	Grammar School	Founded by letters patent in Tooley St, in the Parish of St Olave, Southwark in which "Children and Younglings...are instructed and brought up liberally and prosperously in Grammar, in Accidence, and other Lower Books, to the common utility and profit...." Charter was confirmed on 2 May 1675. Relocated from Southwark to Orpington in 1968.	
Saint Mary Overey Grammar School	Now the Cathedral School of St Saviour & St Mary Overie (Southwark Cathedral)	1562	Church of England Primary School	At the dissolution the priory church was refounded by a charter by "discrete and most creditable inhabitants" endowed with £40; the statutes made a body corporate.	

== Sussex ==
Standard name	Other names	Foundation	Status now	Comments	References
Chichester Grammar School	Oliver Whitby School; The Bluecoat School	1702	Defunct	Founded and endowed by Oliver Whitby of Chichester, by his will of 15 February 1700, devised messuage, lands, tenements, and parsonage in the parish of West Wittering, and lease of prebendary; interest therein to five trustees. "For twelve poor boys to be instructed in Writing, Arithmetic and the Mathematics, with a view of qualifying them more especially for the Sea Service". The school closed in 1950	
Chichester Prebendal Grammar School	The Prebendal School	1497	Independent	Founded by Edward Storey of Boxgrove Priory, and Bishop of Chichester. The only endowment was The Corps of the Prebend of land and tythes at Highley in the parish of Sidlesham, and of portions of tythe in the parishes of Burgham, and Bishopstone, County of Sussex.	
Cuckfield Grammar School		1512	Maintained (state) primary school	Edmund Flower or Edmund Fleur, citizen and merchant taylor of London, endowed the school with lands and tenements of £6 10s. Supplemented by William Spicer, clerk, Parson of Balcombe, the Manor of Redstone, in the Parish of Reigate, in 1529 for £5 p.a. In the 19th century the school became a National (Church of England) school and subsequently became the current Holy Trinity Church of England Primary School. The 16th-century school is now a community centre.	
East Grinstead Grammar School	Imberhorne School	16 August 1708	Comprehensive Community School	Founded by Robert Payne, of Newick, Sussex, by will and endowed with Serreys Farm, a freehold messuage and lands, in the parish of East Grinstead.	
Horsham Grammar School	The College of Richard Collyer	23 January 1532	Sixth Form College	Richard Collyer, citizen and mercer of London, bequeathed realty and personalty.	
Midhurst Grammar School	Midhurst Rother College	15 November 1672	Amalgamated	Founded by Gilbert Hannam, a Coverletmaker, the school was modelled on Winchester College, and endowed by charges on his real and personal estate in Midhurst and Heyshot; for "twelve of the poore men's sonnes in Midhurst aforesaid, such as can ...reade the Bible or Testament."	
Rye Grammar School	Rye College	1636	Comprehensive; Academy		
Southover Grammar School	Southover and Lewes Free Grammar School	1508	Independent	Endowed by Edmund Dudley, an annuity of £20 p.a. out of the Manor of Hamsey, for a free grammar school with the consent of John Ashdown, prior of Lewes. By her will, Agnes vested (1512) in heirs of George Hale, her bequest to the school. Lewes Old Grammar School is the successor institution.	
Steyning Grammar School		16 June 1614	Comprehensive; Academy	Endowed and founded by William Holland, alderman of Chichester donated Brotherhood Hall, manor house and revenues, with consent to appoint a schoolmaster in perpetuity.	

== Warwickshire ==
Standard name	Other names	Foundation	Status now	Comments	References
Atherstone Grammar School		22 December 1573	Defunct	Founded by a royal charter in letters patent for Sir William Devereux, Thomas Fulner and Amias Hill by endowment of 26s. 8d., issuing out of lands and tenements in County of Warwick.	
Birmingham Grammar School	The Royall Free Grammar Schoole in Birmingham, in the County of Warwick; King Edward's School, Birmingham	25 October 1383	Independent	Founded by Thomas de Sheldon, John Colleshull, John Goldsmyth, and William ate Stowe, granted Crown licence lands valued at 20 Marks p.a. in Birmingham and Edgbaston. Refounded on 2 January 1552, granted and ordained by letters patent.	
Coleshill Grammar School	The Coleshill School	1520	Comprehensive Academy		
Coventry Grammar School	King Henry VIII School, Coventry	1546	Independent	Founded by John Hales, who purchased Whitefriars. Refounded in 1573 "besides the Mansion-house and Close adjoining...". Thomas Lane, by his will of 10 January 1656, left money "fitting poor scholars of Coventry for the University...for the space of seven years and a half."	
Dunchurch Grammar School		1708	Defunct	Founded by Francis Boughton, of Cawston Hall, donated the Spittle Moor estate of 16 acres, now let for £90 p.a.	
Nuneaton Grammar School		1553	Defunct	Founded and endowed with three closes of land in Liberties of Coventry belonging to Trinity Gild, known as Lammas land.	
Hampton Lucy Grammar School			Defunct	Founded by William Lucy	
Monk's Kirby Grammar School		19 April 1625	Defunct	Founded by will of Thomas Wale, citizen and mercer of London, gave his manors of Wilbraham, Cambridgeshire, endowed with £300 p.a. Mayor and corporation were trustees.	
Rugby Grammar School	The Free School of Lawrence Sheriff; Rugby School	22 July 1567	Independent	A seminary founded by Lawrence Sheriff, citizen and grocer of London sold property to donate £50 towards building schoolhouse and almshouses in Rugby. Endowed by a Holborn, Middlesex estate, called Brownsover, purchased from John Strete in 1560 for £320.	
Sutton Coldfield Grammar School	Bishop Vesey's Grammar School	1527	Academy	Founded by John Harman, LL.D., later Bishop of Exeter, a school "sufficiently learned and skilful to teach Grammar and Rhetorique within the said Town...feoffment of divers lands" to warden and fellows on 1 October 1544.	
Warwick Grammar School	Warwick School	914	Independent	Refounded in 1540 and endowed with rectories to total of £2,335 p.a. in Counties of Warwick and Worcester, the dissolution was granted to the corporation as trustees of royal bounty.	

== Westmorland ==
Standard name	Other names	Foundation	Status now	Comments	References
Appleby Grammar School		22 March 1574	Comprehensive Academy	Robert Bowes, of Aske, Yorkshire, founded by letters patent and endowed by Queen Elizabeth I with £5 10s 8d. In 1579 with a rent-charge of £20 p.a. on a Manor of Newton Garths in County Durham.	
Bampton Grammar School		1623	Defunct	Founded by Thomas Sutton, DD, Rector of St Saviour's, Southwark collected £500 for the purchase of tithes of corn and hay, in the Parish of Bampton, yielding £70 p.a. Stationery was provided free of charge in 1657. Rent of £15 p.a.	
Barton Grammar School		1649	Defunct	Founded by Gerard Langbaine, DD, Provost of Queen's College, Oxford and Lancelot Dawes, DD, Vicar of Barton. They donated the revenues of estates of Culgnaith and Barton Kirk for endowment.	
Brough Grammar School		1506	Defunct	Founded by John Brunskill, used land at Gibgarth donated by Thomas Blenkinsop, with a chapel "to teach singing, the other to instruct the Children of the place in Grammar." Commissioners Sir Walter Raleigh and Robert Keylway, ordered master "fit...to be settled a fund". In the 19th century the grammar school lapsed.	
Heversham Grammar School	Dallam School	1613	Comprehensive Academy	Founded by Edward Wilson, of Heversham Hall, endowed with "unimproveable rents" in Town of Kendal amounted to £24 1s. 8d. Tithes of Leek to maintain at Queens College, Oxford and Trinity College, Cambridge, "two poor scholars, one in each College", nominated by heirs of Thomas Wilson. Two small "Rice Exhibitions" were endowed at Queen's College, Oxford, a Milner's Exhibition to Magdalene College, Cambridge, and yet another of Lady Elizabeth Hastings.	
Kendal Grammar School	Kirkbie Kendal School	c. 1550	Comprehensive Academy	Founded in Kendal churchyard; and further endowed on sale of rectory of Burton, Westmorland by the Crown in 1578.	
Kirkby Stephen Grammar School		8 November 1566	Comprehensive Academy	Founded by charter of Thomas, Lord Wharton and endowed with a house and garden of £10 p.a. and, a further £12 p.a. chargeable on tithes of Winton, paid by owner the Earl of Lonsdale. Wharton ordained the "said Grant Schoole ...according to the Queen's Majesty's Lycence."	
Kirkby Lonsdale Grammar School	Queen Elizabeth School, Kirkby Lonsdale	1591	Comprehensive Academy	Endowed by Mr. Godsale, of Newton with £100 and, £100 from the town and parish. Lady Curwen of Carus donated a schoolhouse called The Biggins. Mr. Tennant held the reversion of rent-charge on Bedale and Scotton, Yorkshire for a schoolmaster.	
Lowther Grammar School		3 September 1638	Primary School (Lowther Endowed School)	Founded by Richard, son of Sir Christopher Lowther, Knt, Bt., employed a schoolmaster for £100, built in 1640. An endowment to the master of £10 p.a. out of priory of Lambly, Northumberland on £100.	
Measand Grammar School		1711	Defunct	Richard Wright, yeoman, endowed with a messuage and lands was at Nether Scales in the Parish of Orton, valued at £40. A garth was given in 1723 by Richard Law of Cawdale. 20 to 30 children used the Westminster grammars. (Note: Most early grammar schools used either Eton grammars to study both Greek and Latin. Other school systems were used including Westminster grammar, published by Westminster School in the vicinity of parliament, in London. Ward's grammar and Valpy grammar were also used by less well-endowed local free or grammar schools.) The village ceased to exist in 1935, beaing subsumed by Haweswater reservoir.	
Morland Grammar School		1780	Primary School (Morland Area CE Primary School)	Founded by the dean and chapter of Carlisle Cathedral who endowed it with £16 p.a. for the Township of Morland. The children are "admitted at an early age and may remain as long as they please."	
Orton Grammar School		1730	Orton CE Primary School	Original foundation on one acre in Bunflat, a High Field at Orton by Agnes Holme, widow. Built by private subscription; schoolhouse was re-erected in 1808 for £200 by Dr Joseph Burn, vicar; William Holmer; and Margaret Holme, of Orton. It was in trust by 1781 for all poor children of Orton and Raisbeck.	
Ravenstonedale Grammar School		1688	Defunct	Founded by Thomas Fothergill, BD, master of St John's College, Cambridge, Abraham Fothergill, of Chancery Lane, London, Rev. George Fothergill, of Worksop, Nottinghamshire, Richard Fothergill, of Needle House, and George Fothergill of Turn House, all of Ravenstondale Parish. An estate at Bousfield paid rent out to the school for endowments, plus Lord Wharton's annuities of £11 p.a.	
Thrimby Grammar School		2 February 1681	Defunct	Founded by Thomas Fletcher, barrister, of Strickland Low Hall, who granted deeds to Richard Crackenthorpe of Little Strickland, James Webster, clerk, and others an annuity of £10 on Bryam Tenement, High Sandriggs, and Low Sandriggs. The school was demolished c.1814 and replaced by a school at Little Strickland.	
Waitby Grammar School		1680	Defunct	Founded by James Highmore, citizen of London, erected a grammar school "out of his pious charity", and built a school between Waitby and Smardale. In his will he gave £300 to purchase land at Cantley Thwaite to produce an income of £40 p.a. Statutes were approved by the Bishop of Carlisle on 17 May 1694.	
Winton Grammar School		1650	Defunct	Rev. William Morland, M.A., rector of Greystock, a cavalier, founded a school endowed with "several parcels of land in the neighbouring Township of Kaber" at £16 p.a. A schoolhouse was erected in 1659 by R Adamson, R Spenceley, G Shutt, I Bracken, and Robert and Arthur Scaife are memorialised in stone in the village as those responsible for its endowments.	

== Wiltshire ==
Standard name	Other names	Foundation	Status now	Comments	References
Calne Grammar School	The John Bentley School; Kingsbury Green Academy	1557; 29 September 1660	Comprehensive Academy	John Bentley, of Richmond, Surrey founded by his will a school on the proceeds of Fichett Fields, Lincoln's Inn when conveyed in parts to Sir John Berkenhead, knight and sundry others. It followed the Marian foundation of Francis Finamore of Whetham.	
Marlborough Grammar School	St John's Marlborough	1551	Comprehensive Academy	Endowed with lands at Marlborough for the townspeople, the children of foreigners, who settle themselves in the town, shall not be taught gratis" (Note: gratis - full citation "summa non gratis" meant for amount not free. ie. fees to be paid.) With the Earl of Ailesbury as patron, the corporation trustees of the school were aristocratic.	
Salisbury Grammar School	The City of Salisbury School	1546	Defunct	Endowed with £26 1s. 8d. p.a. paid by the mayor to the Exchequer, its royal founder was Queen Elizabeth I. Three boys on foundation read Greek and Latin grammars with no common seal on the town..The school was closed in 1865.	
Salisbury Close Grammar School	Salisbury Choir School, Salisbury Cathedral School	1319	Independent Preparatory School	Founded by Simon de Gandarve. Refounded by Bishop Poole of Old Sarum for eight choristers, clothed, fed and instructed in Latin, writing and arithmetic up to age 14. Day boys and boarders read the Eton Greek and Latin grammars.	

== Worcestershire ==
Standard name	Other names	Foundation	Status now	Comments	References
Bewdley Grammar School		1541-2	Defunct	Endowed in 1591 by will of William Monnox with £6 p.a. on lands at Church Stoke; subsequent endowments from Ballard brothers. A charter was granted c. 1620 "for the better education and instruction of young Children and Youths within the same Borough, Liberties, and Precincts, in good arts, learning, virtue and instruction." The school closed in the 1880s.	
Bromsgrove Grammar School	Bromsgrove School	c. 1550	Independent	Endowed with £7 p.a. payable out of Crown revenues, for boys from Feckenham and Bromsgrove; for scholarships to Sir Thomas Cookes, 2nd Baronet, who linked the school to Worcester College, Oxford from 1693 to the present day.	
Dudley Grammar School	St James Academy, Dudley	1533; 6 October 1562	Comprehensive Academy	Founded by Thomas Wattewood of Stafford, Clothier and Mark Bysmor of London, Still worker. After several mergers in late 20th century it became known as Castle Hill School. The modern academy was built on the same site.	
Evesham Grammar School	The Free Grammar School in the Parish of St Lawrence, Evesham; The Free Grammar School of Prince Henry in Evesham; Prince Henry's High School	5 November 1605	Comprehensive Academy	Charter remodelled grammar schools into one for the town to "instruct the Children of the Town in Latin" on land and house alienated at Dissolution by Abbot of Evesham, Clement Litchfield in 1546; the motto, Parva Magna Crescunt alluded to growing bigger day by day. It was later part of Dr Bell's National Schools system at Evesham. In his will, 5 February 1688, John Gardner, Esq., settled upon the grammar ordering his executors to donate quit rents, £4 6s. 8d. and 18s p.a. from the Goldsmiths Company and St Augustine's, London respectively. After becoming a comprehensive in 1973, the school was converted to a co-educational academy.	
Feckenham Grammar School		1611	Defunct	An ancient Catholic manor in the King's Forest, Feckenham was founded by John and Jane Clarke by an indenture of 4 March 1611. Endowed with 20 nobles p.a. (i.e. £6 13s 4d). Later endowments founded by Sir Thomas Cookes in an indenture of 21 January 1695 included six scholarships at Worcester College, Oxford and the bishop's annuity of £50 p.a. Closes were purchased near common land by Mary and Ann Linton in the parish in order to assign an annuity. Twelve boys each year were taught at no charge.	
Hartlebury Grammar School	The Free Grammar School of Queen Elizabeth I	1383; 7 March 1565	Defunct	Founded by John Gervays. "Gervis Ground" in Elmley Lovett was recovered for the school in Attorney-General v. the Governors of Hartlebury School, 1835. More land in Rushock called 'Stirmy's Ground' was demised in 1479, but returned in proceedings. Much of the land in the parish was flooded meadow on the banks of the Stour when enfeoffed by Robert Buckbarrowe. Many enfeoffees had existed at charter of letters patent on 20 May 1558/9 The governors were "twenty of the most discreet and honest men (magis probioribus) of the Parish shall be a Body Corporate and Politic...", appearing in Bishop Sandys' prepared ordinances governing the school's rules on 7 March 1573. The school closed in 1987.	
Kidderminster Grammar School	King Charles I School	10 October 1634	Comprehensive Academy	Charles I set up a commission to investigate the absence of a free grammar in the town of Kidderminster, and two years later in 1636 the school gained its charter. However Sir Thomas Blount was accredited with founding the school in 1558. Henry Benton, High Bailiff conveyed some land to the school on 12 October 1578.	
Martley Grammar School		1579	Defunct	Endowed by enfeoffment and charitable donations by Henry Bromley who held the terrier of 104 acres. There was an earlier (1315) predecessor chantry school. Accumulated endowments were used to re-establish a school with this name in 1913 which subsequently evolved to the current secondary school the Chantry School, Martley.	
King's Norton Grammar School	King Edward VI King's Norton School for Boys	1434; 1547	Boys' Comprehensive Academy	The earliest possible date of foundation was in 1434. However, there was a Tudor re-foundation at the reformation; it received a charter in 1558. The school was refounded in 1912.	
Rock Grammar School		c. 1550	Defunct	Endowed with £5 14s. p.a. paid out of Crown Land revenues, the school was founded by the church, and was later expanded to a half-acre site. Thomas Cookes provided a scholarship to Worcester College, Oxford, elected by the Provost.	
Stourbridge Grammar School		1430; 17 June 1553	Sixth form college	From a chantry of 1430, the new grammar school was a King Edward VI foundation. Endowed later by letters patent with eight governors "with perpetual succession - and should have a Common Seal." Endowed on the late Chantry churches.	
Wolverley Grammar School		25 October 1620	Defunct	Founded by will of William Sebright, of Blakeshall in the parish of Wolverley by Sir John Sebright of London on messuage of Mark Lane and pasture in Bethnal Green held by free socage. Sir John Sebright obtained an act of Parliament in 1812. The school was closed in 1970, and re-located to new premises to re-open as a comprehensive.	
King's School, Worcester	The King's or Cathedral College School, Worcester	900	Independent	Refounded on 16 January 1540/1 by letters patent with additional endowments of Evesham and Pershore Abbeys: In 1543-4 "forty poor scholars, ten of whom are appointed by the Dean, and three by each of the ten prebendaries of the cathedral...to be taught both grammar and lodgicke and laten tongue, every of them 66s. 8d. [i.e. 10 marks ] by the yere." (Note: originally in Latin Scholares, they became after the Reformation, known as Scholastici emphasizing the move away from monastic boys in cells, towards the dynamics of studying. The 40 are named in Wheeler (1987), p.21.) The school was revived by Thomas Wylde's purchase of Little prytche croft and 4 1/2 acres of Great prytche croft gifted by will on 19 May 1558.	(Note: according to Leach pp.14-5, the puritans burnt the original records of the Trinity Guild in Elizabethan times. Modern interpretation puts the date a year later.)
Royal Grammar School Worcester	The Royal Free Grammar School of Queen Elizabeth in the City of Worcester	685	Independent	One of the oldest surviving schools in Britain. Refounded in 1561 as a school for "petits"; for "the classical education of twelve boys, - and endowed with land and houses of considerable value, which are let on an improvident lease by The Corporation." Under the Chantries Act the Crown induced the city to purchase the Trinity Guild. In 1550 John Oliver acquired the letters patent. Lady Pakington and John Tomes, schoolmaster drafted the charter, granted a re-foundation on 28 February 1561, "for a scole for a.b.c and gramer of the teachinge, erudition, and instruction of children ...in good learnyinge and manors." The name grammar was changed by the royal charter of 20 May 1869. (Note: Chantry schools were founded in the Chapel in Edward III's day, but although dissolved, had nothing to do with the grammar schools had noting to do with the grammar schools. F.V.Follet, A History of the Worcester Royal Grammar School (1951), pp.14-5. For a summary A.R. Wheeler, Royal Grammar School, Worcester (1990), p.13) Eight new governors were appointed under Endowed Schools Act of 15 March 1893.	

== Yorkshire ==
Standard name	Other names	Foundation	Status now	Comments	References
Acaster Selby Grammar School	St Andrew's College	1470	Defunct	Founded by Bishop Robert Stillington, a native of Nether Acaster (older name of Acaster Selby)	
Arksey Grammar School	The Free School at Arksey; Arksey Endowed School	1660	Primary School	Bryan Cooke Esq.'s will (3 January 1660) endowed a grammar school. His son Sir George Cooke, bart built the school and master's house. Rev. Crichley of Doncaster paid £10 p.a. for half a scholarship for a poor boy of Bentley-in-Arksey.	
Batley Grammar School		1613	Comprehensive	Founded by Rev William Lee, Vicar of Stapleford, Cambridge and endowed with 30 acres in the Township of Gomersall yielding £15 p.a. Further endowments followed at Gomersall for £327 8s., and Horbury for £32 5s.	
Bedale Grammar School		Ancient	Defunct	Endowed with £7 11s. 4d at the Dissolution. Additional rent charge of £13 6s. 8d p.a. (20 marks) out of lands at Collough Grange, Lincolnshire. The former schoolhouse is now a private residence.	
Beverley Grammar School		700	Comprehensive Academy	Britain's oldest state school	
Bingley Grammar School		1529	Comprehensive	Since 2011 the school has had specialist status	
Bowes Grammar School		1693	Bowes Hutchinson's C of E (Aided) Primary School	Located near Greta Bridge (a well known staging post). The founder was William Hutchinson. Charles Parkin, nephew of the founder established a scholarship for a Bowes scholar to attend Pembroke College, Cambridge. Not to be confused with the privately run Bowes Academy considered to be the model for Dotheboys Hall with Charles Dickens having researched the press reports of the 1823 legal cases against headmster William Shaw.	
Bradford Grammar School		1553	Independent	Incorporated by letters patent on 10 October 1663 from Charles II. Bradford Grammar School had Direct Grant status until 1975, when it became independent.	
Cawthorne Grammar School	The Free School at Cawthorne	25 June 1639	Now Cawthorne Church Of England (VC) Primary School	£5 4s. paid to schoolmaster by Receiver of the Honour of Pontefract of the Duchy of Lancaster plus an additional sum from the town of £8 2s. 8d.	
Coxwold Grammar School	The Free Grammar School at Coxwold	1603	Defunct	Founded by Sir John Harte knight, citizen, and alderman of London charged his manor of Silton for an annual payment of £36 to the master of the school. The school was closed in 1894 and is now a private residence i.e. The Old Hall, Coxwold	
Doncaster Grammar School	Hall Cross Academy	1350	Comprehensive Academy	the grammar amalgamated with the Doncaster Girls School; converted to academy status in 2012.	
Drax Grammar School	The Free Grammar School at Drax; Read School, Drax	1667	Independent	Founded by a local lawyer and philanthropist, Charles Read (fl. 1660s), gentleman, of Darleton, County of Nottingham, who built a school and almshouses in the town.	
Drighlington Grammar School	The Free Grammar School at Drighlington, near Leeds	1678	Sccessor is Drightlington Primary School.	James Margetson, Archbishop of Armagh, founded a benevolence for the school's endowment from lands, tenements and hereditaments in Drighlington and Newhall. Received letters patent in 1691. Replaced in 1875 by the Drighlington Board School. The latter is now a residential building and there is a modern primary school.	
Giggleswick Grammar School	The Free Grammar School of King Edward the Sixth of Giggleswick	26 May 1553	Independent	Founded by letters patent on the petition of a clerk, John Newell. Six scholarships founded by Mr Carr to Christ's College, Cambridge.	
Guisbrough Grammar School	Prior Pursglove College	19 June 1561	6th Form College	The Grammar School, Almshouse or Hospital in Honour of Our Lord Jesus Christ in the Town of Gisburn. An Elizabethan foundation by letters patent endowed by Prior Robert Pursglove originally £41 4s, by the division of common fields at Bolam, subsequently augmented. Approval of the master's appointment lay with the Archdeacon of Cleaveland. Rebuilt in 1887 by Alfred Waterhouse, and refurbished in 2013.	
Halifax Grammar School	The Free Grammar School of Queen Elizabeth at Skircoat in the Parish of Halifax; The Free Grammar School of Queen Elizabeth at Heath, near Halifax; Heath Grammar School	15 February 1585	Amalgamated now The Crossley Heath School; Grammar School; Academy	Founded by a royal charter procured by Henry Farrer of Ewood at his own expense. Archbishop Blackburn appointed eleven governors nominated, signed and under seal on 23 October 1727.	
Hartford Grammar School		1561	Defunct	Robert Pursglove, clerk, the last prior of Guisbrough Priory, was granted letters patent "for the education and learning of boys and youth..."	
Hemsworth Grammar School	The Free School of Robert Halgate, Archbishop of York; Holgate School, Barnsley	24 October 1546	Relocated and later amalgamated	Founded by Robert Halgate of Hemsworth, Archbishop of York and President of the King's Council in the North on property of a rental charge of £150. (Note: early 16th century Halgate's name was post-medieval etymology, but by Elizabethan period the surname had evolved into a modern form of Holgate) The school was relocated to Barnsley in 1888. In 2012 the school was amalgamated to form part of the Horizon Community College.	
Heptonstall Grammar School		14 July 1642	Defunct	The Free School was founded by Charles Greenwood (fl. 1640s), clerk in holy orders, Rector of Thornhill, by his will dated 14 July 1642	
Hipperholme Grammar School		15 October 1647	Independent	The Free School in Hipperholme was founded by Matthew Broadley of London by his will dated 15 October 1547 "to educate and instruct in Grammar, and other Literature and Learning, the Scholars and Children of the Township and Constablery of Hipperholme cum Brighouse."	
Horton Grammar School		1725	Defunct	Founded by John Armistead, gentleman of Dubcoat, on land purchased by the trustees to the value of £180 p.a. The successor school (Horton CE Primary School) closed in 2017.	
Hull Grammar School	The Free Grammar School of Kingston upon Hull	1486.	Independent; Merged and renamed Tranby School	Refounded in the reign of Edward VI and endowed by John Alcock, of Beverley, Bishop of Rochester, who built the schoolhouse in his own garden beside Trinity Church. Suppressed at Reformation; it was reprieved on remonstrance. (Note: During the Counter-reformation an appeal could be made to parliament against a decision, by customary law this was achieved on petition. The reprieve refers to the fact that the vast majority of religious houses were dissolved and broken up during the 1530s and 1540s. A reprieve to allow an institution to continue was relatively unusual. The Act of Supremacy 1534 gave the King ultimate power over the Church in England and Wales. However Parliament could make an amendment to an act on certain specified institutions.)	
Kirk Leatham Grammar School		1709	Defunct	In his will of 1669, Sir William Turner bequeathed £5,000 for the foundation of a free grammar school, erected by nephew Cholmley Turner in 1709. It is now a museum.	
Kirkby on the Hill Grammar School	The Free Grammar School at Kirkby on the Hill, in the Parish of Kirkby Ravenswath	25 October 1556	Defunct	Founded by John Dakyn LLD, Rector of Kirkby on the Hill by licence granted, nullibi saltem cum cura animarum beneficiatum, neque officiatum, doctum et in arte grammatica peritum, qui pueros ipsius parochiae.... The school closed in 1957, just one year after its 400th anniversary. The former school's building is now a private house and a Grade II* listed building.	
Knaresborough Grammar School	King James's School, Knaresborough	26 October 1617	Comprehensive	Founded by letters patent granted to Robert Chaloner, STD of Knaresborough, Rector of Amersham, issued a rent charge to lands in Wavendon, County of Buckingham. Peter Benson designed the schoolhouse erected in the adjoining churchyard.	
Leeds Grammar School		6 March 1552	Independent	Founded by endowment in the will of William Sheafield, Priest, vested in seventeen feoffees copyhold near Shipscar Bridge, Leeds. Two endowments by John Harrison (1653); Lady Elizabeth Hastings bequeathed on 24 April 1739, £140 Quit Rents to Queens College, Oxford. Additional funds were appropriated in a chancery case (1805).	
Linton Grammar School		11 July 1771	Defunct	Founded by Richard Fountains (alternatively Fountaine and Fountain) a native of the village who became a successful London merchant.	
Old Malton Grammar School	Malton School	1546	Comprehensive	Founded by Dr Robert Holgate, Archbishop of York and endowed with land and tenement valued £20.	
Northallerton Grammar School		October 1327	Comprehensive	May have dated from a royal charter to the Prior of Durham presented John Podesay as master. However an extant document declared on 15 December 1385 that William de Ledes (of the family that founded Leeds) was delicto nobis...Capellano (was chosen our Head). Public subscription was raised in 1777 to rebuild the school. Rev James Wilkinson built a master's house in 1785.	
Penistone Grammar School	The Free Grammar School at Penniston, near Barnesley	1392	Comprehensive	Robert Wattes bequeathed a reading school "unto everie childe that commithe in forme of a scole 1d." Endowed with £100 p.a. "for the education of eight poor girls", Penistone was founded as a reading school. The master of the school was behind the introduction of a fair to the Pennine town via petition. The school was frequently in court for litigation. By 1785 the school house was in ruins. In 2011 a state of the art Learning Centre was opened.	
Pocklington Grammar School		1514	Independent	Founded by John Dolman (or Doweman) LL.D., Archdeacon of Suffolk, endowed by land in East and West Ridings of Yorkshire; annual rent of £1,000 to £1,200. Transferred to St John's College, Cambridge by statute on 8 April 1552.	
Pontefract Grammar School	The King's School, Pontefract	1549	Comprehensive	Endowed until 1563, when presentment transferred to mayor and aldermen of Pontefract. Additional endowment was made in 1583. Refounded by royal charter on 13 February 1792, renamed the King's School, and signed by Attorney-General, John Ord.	
Richmond Grammar School	Richmond School	14 March 1568	Comprehensive Academy	Founded by royal licence in the yard of the Low Church una schola Grammaticalis...pro educatione, institutione, et instructione puerorum et juvenum in Grammatica perpetuis temporibus duratura	
Ripon Grammar School	The Free Grammar School of Queen Mary	27 June 1555	State grammar school	Founded by Anthony Frankish, to the town and parish by letters patent under the Seal of the Duchy of Lancaster.	
Rotherham Grammar School	Thomas Rotherham College	1 September 1584	16-19 Academy	Lawrence Woodnett of Lincoln's Inn and Anthony Collins of London by deed conveyed land to trustees and heirs in Masbrough and Brinsworth as well as Rotherham including house near the town hall. This was refounding of Thomas Rotherham's earlier school. The grammar school closed in 1967, being replaced by a Sixth Form College.	
Royston Grammar School	1608	Defunct	Founded by letters patent on 24 acres valued at £70 p.a.		
Scorton Grammar School		1720	Defunct	By his will Leonard Robinson of Scorton left a property value £200 p.a. to endow a school "to prepare young Gentlemen for the Universities....". The school remained independent but closed in 1991.	
Sedbergh Grammar School		Before 1551	Independent	Chantry foundation of Dr Roger Lupton, Provost of Eton; set up again by letters patent of Edward VI. In the 1860s it came near to closure by the Taunton Commission.	
Sheffield Grammar School	The Free Grammar School of James King of England within the Town of Sheffield in the County of Yorkshire	1605	Defunct	Thomas Smith of Crowland, attorney, left by his will £30 p.a. for the foundation incorporated by letters patent	
Sherburn Grammar School	Hungate Hospital and School	1619	Sherburn Hungate Primary School	Founded by Robert Hungate, Counsellor, endowed with £120 p.a. for the "clothing and maintenance of the boys in the Hospital..." out of land belonging to Robert Oliver Gascoigne, of Parlington.	
Shipton Grammar School		1655	Defunct	Founded by Ann Middleton and endowed with £40 p.a.	
Skipton Grammar School	Ermysted's Grammar School	1 September 1548	State grammar school	William Ermysted, clerk, canon residentiary in St Paul's, London granted Sir Ingram Clyfford all properties at Adyngham, Yorkshire for a Grammar school for "boys resorting thither to be taught".	
Thornton Grammar School	Beckfoot Thornton	1657	Comprehensive Academy	Elizabeth, Viscountess Lumley endowed with £30 p.a. for a master in holy orders to teach the school and read prayers in chapel on ten acres at Thornton. A 19th-century chancery case defined it as a grammar school.	
Tickhill Grammar School		c. 1690	Primary School	Mrs Jane Farmery gave a piece of land in the parish, the rent charge of which educated eighteen boys in English. In 1815 a Sunday School was also founded. Became a National School in 1821. Now Tickhill St Mary's Church of England Primary and Nursery School.	
Topcliffe Grammar School		1549	Defunct.	Letters patent of 1549. A school house was built in 1822 on the site of one previously erected in 1695. The Grade II listed building is located in the north side of the St Columba churchyard.	
Wakefield Grammar School	The Free Grammar School of Queen Elizabeth at Wakefield	1592	Independent	Founded for the "teaching, instructing and bringing up of Children and Youth in Grammar and other learning".	
Worsborough Grammar School			Defunct		
Wragby Grammar School			Defunct		
Yarm Grammar School	Free Grammar School of Thomas Conyers; Conyers' School	7 July 1590	Comprehensive Academy	Endowed by Thomas Conyers of Egglescliffe, County Palatinate of Durham left by his will £9 4s. paid on properties in Yarm and Darlington for "the schole of Yarome for ever." It moved to new premises at Green Lane on becoming a Comprehensive school in 1977.	
Yoresbridge Grammar School		1601	Defunct	Founded and endowed in the Parish of Aysgarth by Anthony Besson with a house at York.	
York Holgate's Free Grammar School	Archbishop Holgate's School	1546	Comprehensive Academy	Endowed by Robert Holgate with £12 p.a. for a master "to read and teach Grammar, and other good authors and works, generally to all scholars..."	
York Horse Fair Grammar School	St Peter's School, York	1330	Independent	Originally founded by a monk, St Paulinus of York in 627 AD. An early patron, Robert de Pykering, Dean of York, dedicated the school to St Mary Magdalene. It was re-founded in 1557 outside the city walls at a place called Horsefair.	

== North Wales ==
Standard name	Other names	Foundation	Status now	Comments	References
St Asaph Grammar School		Not identified in Carlisle's book	Defunct	Founded for the classical instruction of the cathedral choristers. At the time of (Carlisle's) publication, both pupils and school were reported as being abandoned	
Bala Grammar School	Ysgol y Berwyn	1712	Comprehensive	Rev Edmund Mayrick, Chancellor of St Davids, founded and endowed with £15 p.a. and five acres "for 30 poor boys of North Wales"	
Bangor Friars School	Ysgol Friars	24 March 1561	Comprehensive	Geoffrey Glynne bequeathed 'The Friar House' in Bangor to Maurice, late Bishop of Rochester and William, late Bishop of Bangor "to the use and behoof of a Grammar School having continuance for ever...for the better government and instruction of boys...ten poor scholars."	
Beaumaris Grammar School	Ysgol David Hughes	1609	Comprehensive	Lewis Owen, Serjeant of the Larder, bequeathed £20 p.a. for two scholars of Jesus College, Oxford to come from the grammar school.	
Bôd-Twnog Grammar School	Ysgol Botwnnog	1615	Comprehensive	Henry Rowlands, Bishop of Bangor endowed a grammar school near Pwllheli, Gwynedd but "left it in a poor state".	
Denbigh Grammar School		1727	Defunct	Founded and built in the centre of the old town. 33 persons contributed a total of £340 in public subscription. The money purchased an estate in the parish of Tremerchon, Flintshire managed by three trustees. It consisted of 29 acres of land paying rent, and three acres of Henllan donated by Robert Lloyd Tanner and Anne Twiston with two allotments for maintenance of the free grammar school. It was re-opened in 1866 at Bron-y-Parc an ancient Welsh site on Park Street, Denbigh. After the Gladstonian Welsh Intermediate School Act 1884 the school was enlarged and re-designated in 1894 as the County Board School entrusting its funding to the Denbighshire County Council. In 1902 it was greatly expanded to 220 pupils. In 1937 it merged with the Ruthin Girls Schools to create the County boys School in new purpose-built buildings designed by architect James Hughes and built on the Middle Lane site once owned by the latter establishment. It became co-educational in 1938 and apparently was renamed as Denbigh Grammar School in 1948. It remained the main school for the Denbigh and Ruthin District until the abolition of grammar schools by the Labour Government of 1970s. The school closed in 1983. The site was demolished in 2017 against the advice issued by conservationists Cadw six years before.	
Hawarden Grammar School	The Free Grammar School at Hawarden in the County of Flint. Hawarden High School	1609	Comprehensive	Founded by George Ledsham, gentleman and steward of the Inner Temple, London by his will of 4 February 1606 left £300 to a free grammar school forever. During the 1?th century, the Gladstone family became landowners of Hawarden and heavily involved with the school; a new school board became non-denominational and governed by the National Society of Education and Learning: Sir Stephen Glynne was headmaster (1848–1851). By 1870 there were 90 boys. Hawarden won High School of the Year Award 2016.	
Llan Egryn Grammar School	The Free Grammar School at Llan Egryn in the County of Merioneth	1648	Defunct	Founded by Hugh Owen of Tal y Bont (near Llanegryn). Endowed it with £20 p.a. by the Peniarth estate. His son, William Owen, mercer, of London, endowed it with further £400 funded in trust. The Owen family continued its endowment from the Mercers Company of London. Up to four boys annually became apprentices, rather than offered university student awards. William Edward Watkyn Wynn MP was one of the trustees and the rectors of Dollgellau, who with the Owens expanded the school, which in 1812 was in serious debt.	
Llanrwst Grammar School	Ysgol Dyffryn Conwy, Conwy Valley School	1612	Comprehensive	Sir John Wynn, 1st Baronet; there is some doubt, but it is thought to have foundation here, in 1610 by Sir John Wynn. The teaching was located in the building called the 'upper school'. In 1960 it was renamed Ysgol Dyffryn Conwy (Conwy Valley School) to reflect the fact that the school served the wider Conwy Valley. In February 2005 the pupils were all moved to the Sodexo-owned site on Nebo Road.	
Ruabon Grammar School	Rhiwabon Grammar School, in the County of Denbigh. Ysgol Rhiwabon	1575	Comprehensive	The extant buildings were begun in 1618, assisted by a legacy left by Thomas Nevitt in 1632. The vicar of the parish, Dr Lloyd, became the first headmaster. A dedicated and distinguished teacher named Thomas Evans reformed the curriculum in 1710 which still had to read Latin and Greek. Another teacher, George Bagley, paid for kitchens for the school. In 1855 he was replaced by Alfred Lee Taylor, a Cambridge graduate, who oversaw repairs and maintenance to a dilapidated building. The 32nd Charity Commissioners' report noted it had a school-room and a master's room. The original building appears to have had a Victorian conversion into a shop. It was built of red brick with a Welsh slate roof. The original windows date from the early 19th century. The hipped roofs were in place when it was inspected. The downstairs timbered mullion windows to the right of a stack, to which a door was built during the 20th century. The beams were champfered; above the fireplace was a lozenge dated 1698; the purlins and tie-beam above dated from the same period. Iron cramps were added in 19th century for stability. In 1853, the grammar school was reconstituted with new trustees, prompting Mr Bagley's resignation. Sir Watkin Williams-Wynn became patron, paying for the reconstruction of new buildings in 1858 that now represent the oldest part of the old school. It was the first in Wales to receive funds as a County School in 1894, being overseen by the new Denbighshire County Council. It still functioned like a competitive grammar school, with academic selection and examinations for Oxbridge. Headmaster Rev Bowen broached the idea of a girls' school. New classrooms were completed in 1927 and 1938 with laboratories and workshops. The school was divided into four houses: Cynwrig, Madoc, Rhuddallt, Wynnstay. The grammar school and 11-plus system were abolished in 1966/7 and the school became an integrated Comprehensive. In 1988 the buildings received a Grade II listing, and in 1994 they were converted for residential purposes.	
Ruthin Grammar School	The Grammar School at Ruthin in the County of Denbigh	1598	Defunct	Founded by Dr Gabriel Goodman, Dean of Westminster "for the instruction of the boys of the Town of Ruthin - Ruthin, Llan Fwrog, Llan Rhydd, Llanynys, and Llan Elidan.	
Wrexham Grammar School	The Free School at Wrexham in the County of Denbigh	3 October 1728	Defunct	Founded by Dorothy Jeffreys and endowed with £18 p.a., later augmented to £80 p.a.	

== South Wales ==
Monmouthshire is listed separately.

Standard name	Other names	Foundation	Status now	Comments	References
The College of Christ of Brecknock	Christ College, Brecon	1541	Independent	Founded at Aber Gwili at the Reformation of Henry VIII.	
Carmarthen Grammar School	Queen Elizabeth Grammar School Carmarthen	7 July 1576	Defunct	Elizabeth I founded by letters patent at the petition of Walter, Earl of Essex, Richard Davies, Sir James Croft, Griffin, Rece, and Walter Vaughan, aldermen, and Robert Toye, gentleman, Burgess of Caermarthen under "license not exceeding the yearly value of £60." Closed 1978.	
Cardigan Grammar School	Cardigan County School; Cardigan Secondary School	1653	Bilingual comprehensive	The Common Council of the Commission to the Propagation of the Gospel in Wales founded during the Cromwellian Protectorate. It became extinct during the 18th Century. Refounded as the County School in 1895.	
Cowbridge Grammar School	Cowbridge Comprehensive School	1685.	Comprehensive	Initial foundation 1608 by Sir John Stradling. Closed 1974.	
Haverfordwest Grammar School		1488	Defunct	Endowed on 22 November 1614 by Thomas Lloyd, of Killythed, Pembrokeshire, where "scholars may be instructed and taught in such learning and knowledge as are fitting to be taught...." for an income of £84 19s. 4d.,. (Note: translation: In 1818, for real value of £160) It was closed in 1978.	
Lledrod Grammar School	Lledrod Primary School (Ysgol Gynradd Lledrod)	21 May 1745	Defunct	Founded by Rev. Thomas Oliver of Lledrod, Vicar of Dudley, "for the benefit of a limited number of poor boys of his native district", he left a farm valued at £400. The school became the now closed village primary school.	
Presteigne Grammar School	John Beddoes School	20 August 1568.	Defunct	Founded by John Beddoes, by deed in chancery, endowed with lands of £150 plus by eleven trustees. John Beddoes School was closed in 2014. The premises were taken over by Newtown High School,	
Rhayader Grammar School		1673 or earlier	Defunct	Endowed for the education of a limited number of poor children.	
St David's Grammar School		17 May 1654	Defunct	Founded by Adam Houghton on the authority of the Council of State. It is thought to be the only grammar school to be so founded. The school closed in 1957.	
Swansea Grammar School	Bishop Gore School	4 May 1682	Comprehensive	Founded by Bishop Hugh Gore, Lord Bishop of Waterford and Lismore, Ireland, and endowed by deed with 200 acres in Llandyfodwg to Bussey Mansel, of Britton Ferry.	
Ystrad Meurig Grammar School	St John's College	1 October 1757	Defunct	Founded by Edward Richard "for educating twelve poor boys of this parish in the principles of the Church of England".	

== See also ==
- List of the oldest schools in the United Kingdom
- List of direct grant grammar schools
- Armorial of UK schools

== Bibliography ==
- Nichlas Carlisle, A Concise Description of the Endowed Grammar Schools in England and Wales, Volume 1 and 2 [1818] Publisher: Baldwin, Cradock and Joy, London
