= Hagley Park =

Hagley Park may refer to:

- Hagley Park, Christchurch, a public park in Christchurch, New Zealand
- Hagley Park, Worcestershire, a deer park belonging to Hagley Hall (DY9 9LG), England, notable for its follies and poetical associations
- Hagley Hall, Rugeley, a Staffordshire residence and estate also known as Hagley Park during the 19th century; a nearby secondary school called Hagley Park was named after it between 1955 - 2015
- Hagley Park, formerly a residence in Herefordshire, England, now a street on the outskirts of Bartestree (HR1 4DB)
- Hagley Park in Kingston, Jamaica, a parliamentary division and postal zone (Kingston 11) based along Hagley Park Road, and also the name of a local school

== See also ==
- Hagley Park Oval, a cricket oval in Hagley Park, Christchurch, New Zealand
- Hagley Recreation Park, a sports ground in Hagley, Tasmania
