= Hagley Park Academy =

Location
- Burnthill Lane; Rugeley, Staffordshire, WS15 2HZ; United Kingdom
- Coordinates: 52°45′18″N 1°56′37″W

Information
- Type: Academy
- Established: c. 1950s
- Closed: September 2016
- Local authority: Staffordshire
- Department for Education URN: 137103 Tables
- Ofsted: Reports
- Gender: Mixed
- Age: 11 to 18
- Enrolment: 595 as of February 2016
- Houses: Brunel, Cooper, Davy & Jones
- Colour: Blue
- Website: http://www.hagleyparkacademy.org.uk

Hagley Park Academy was originally founded as Hagley Park County Secondary Modern in 1955 and was located in Rugeley, Staffordshire.

== History ==
=== Arson attacks ===
On Monday 3 February 1975 at 11.45pm there was an arson attack that cost £200,000.

On Saturday 19 August 1978 there was an arson attack that cost £150,000. There were 40 firemen, who for 90 minutes, pumped water from the school swimming pool.

Both fires were started by 18 year old Keith Fletcher. His father had been sacked from the school, the former caretaker, after committing an offence. He was possibly a pyromaniac, being 'fascinated by fire engines'. He had made hoax phone calls to attract attention of the fire service.

He started the second fire, when intoxicated, in revenge for his father being sacked. He was given two years at Stafford Court on Friday 3 November 1978, after pleading guilty. The judge was looking at much longer imprisonment.

=== Academy ===
Later it was rebuilt and changed its name to Hagley Park Sports College, becoming Hagley Park Academy between 2011 and 2015. This was a mixed secondary school which was part of the Creative Education Trust, along with Fair Oak Academy and Rugeley Sixth Form Academy.

=== Merger ===
In November 2015 the Creative Education Trust launched a consultation on the possibility of merging its academies in Rugeley. The plans foresaw the new school operating over two sites, with pupils in academic years 7, 8 and 9 housed at the Fair Oak Academy site as a lower school and years 10, 11, 12 and 13 housed at the Hagley Park Academy site as an upper school. The merger commenced in September 2016, and The Hart School opened in its place, using the Hagley Park site to house 'Upper School' years (10, 11, 12 and 13).

From January 2021 to March 2022, during the COVID-19 pandemic, former Hagley Park Academy facilities were used as a free walk-in COVID-19 testing site.
