= SS Charlebury =

List of ships with the same or similar names.

Charlebury was the name of three ships operated by Alexander Shipping Co Ltd.

- SS Charlebury (1906), acquired 1921, sold 1935
- SS Charlebury (1940), torpedoed and sunk in 1942
- SS Charlebury (1941), ex Empire Clive, purchased 1946, sold 1958
