= The Hart School =

Location
- Penkridge Bank Road; Rugeley, Staffordshire, WS15 2UE; England
- Coordinates: 52.759°N 1.950°W

Information
- Type: Academy
- Motto: We Can, We Will, We Do
- Established: September 2016
- School district: Cannock Chase
- Local authority: Staffordshire County
- Trust: Creative Education Trust
- Department for Education URN: 137100 Tables
- Ofsted: Reports
- Chair of Governors: Alan Murphy
- Principal: Rachel Sandham
- Staff: 130
- Gender: Mixed
- Age: 11 to 18
- Enrolment: 1300 estimate
- Capacity: 1400
- Website: www.hartschool.org.uk

The Hart School is a secondary education academy in Rugeley, England, UK. The school is divided across two sites, and was formed in September 2016 following the merger of Hagley Park Academy and Fair Oak Academy. This was consulted upon and approved in the academic year for 2015–16.

The uniform consists of a grey blazer with blue trim; a grey tie with orange, blue and green stripes; a shirt; plain black trousers or a knee-length skirt; and polishable black shoes.

The Hart school has a capacity of 1400 and currently has estimated 1300 admissions.
