= Fair Oak Academy =

Coordinates: 52.7562948°N 1.9568546°W

Location
- Penkridge Bank Road; Rugeley; Staffordshire, S15 2UE; England

Information
- Type: Academy
- Closed: 2016
- Local authority: Staffordshire
- Department for Education URN: 137100 Tables
- Ofsted: Reports
- Gender: Mixed
- Age: 11 to 18

Fair Oak Academy was a mixed secondary school located in Rugeley in the English county of Staffordshire.

Previously known as Fair Oak High School, the school gained specialist status as a Business and Enterprise College and was renamed Fair Oak Business and Enterprise College. In September 2011 the school converted to academy status and was renamed Fair Oak Academy. The school was then sponsored by the Creative Education Trust, along with Hagley Park Academy and Rugeley Sixth Form Academy.

In November 2015 the Creative Education Trust launched a consultation on the possibility of merging its academies in Rugeley. The plans foresaw the new school operating over two sites, with pupils in academic years 7, 8 and 9 housed at the Fair Oak Academy site as a lower school and years 10, 11, 12 and 13 housed at the Hagley Park Academy site as an upper school. The merger commenced in September 2016 with the new combined school known as The Hart School.
