= Cumberland =

Historic county of England

- Historic county
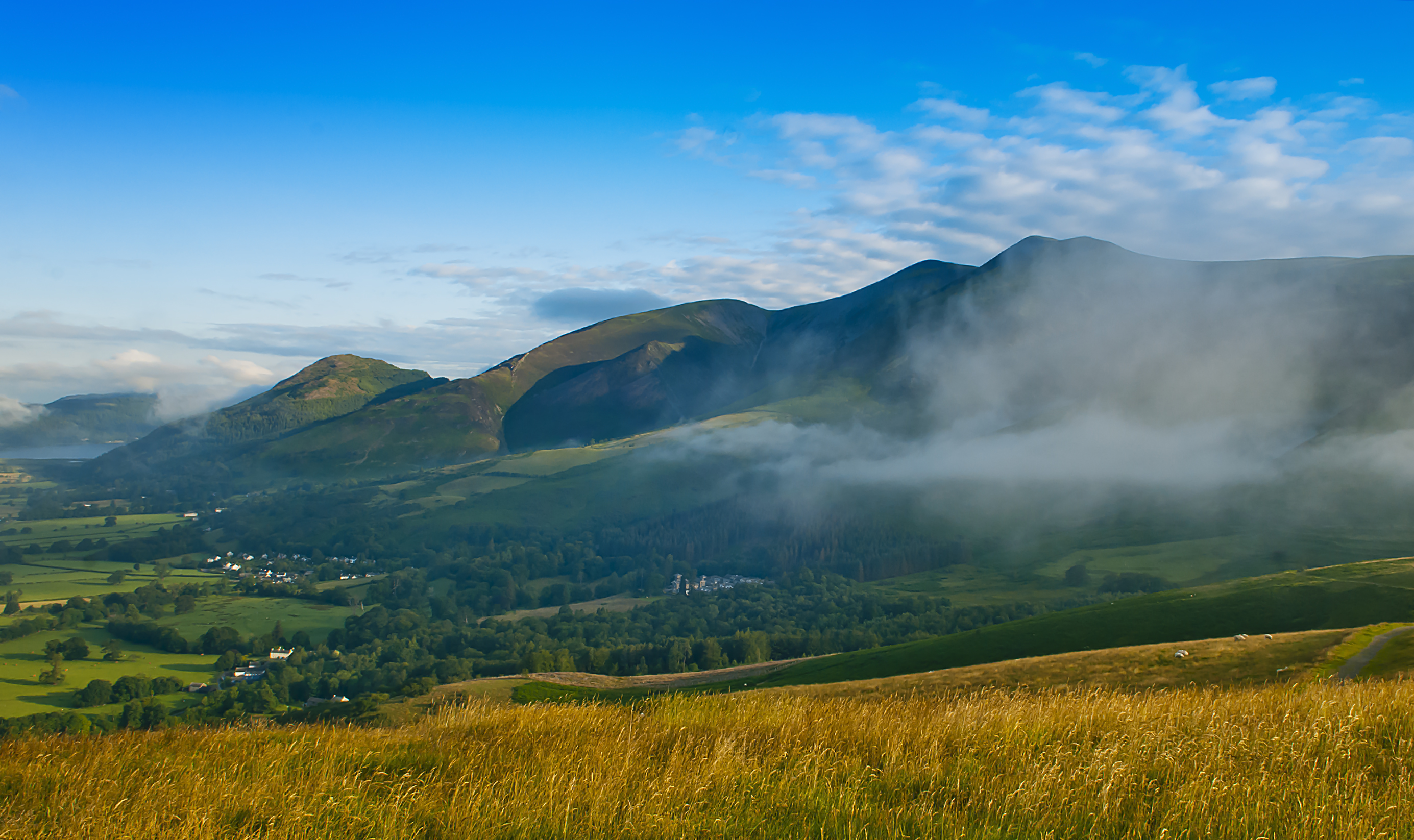
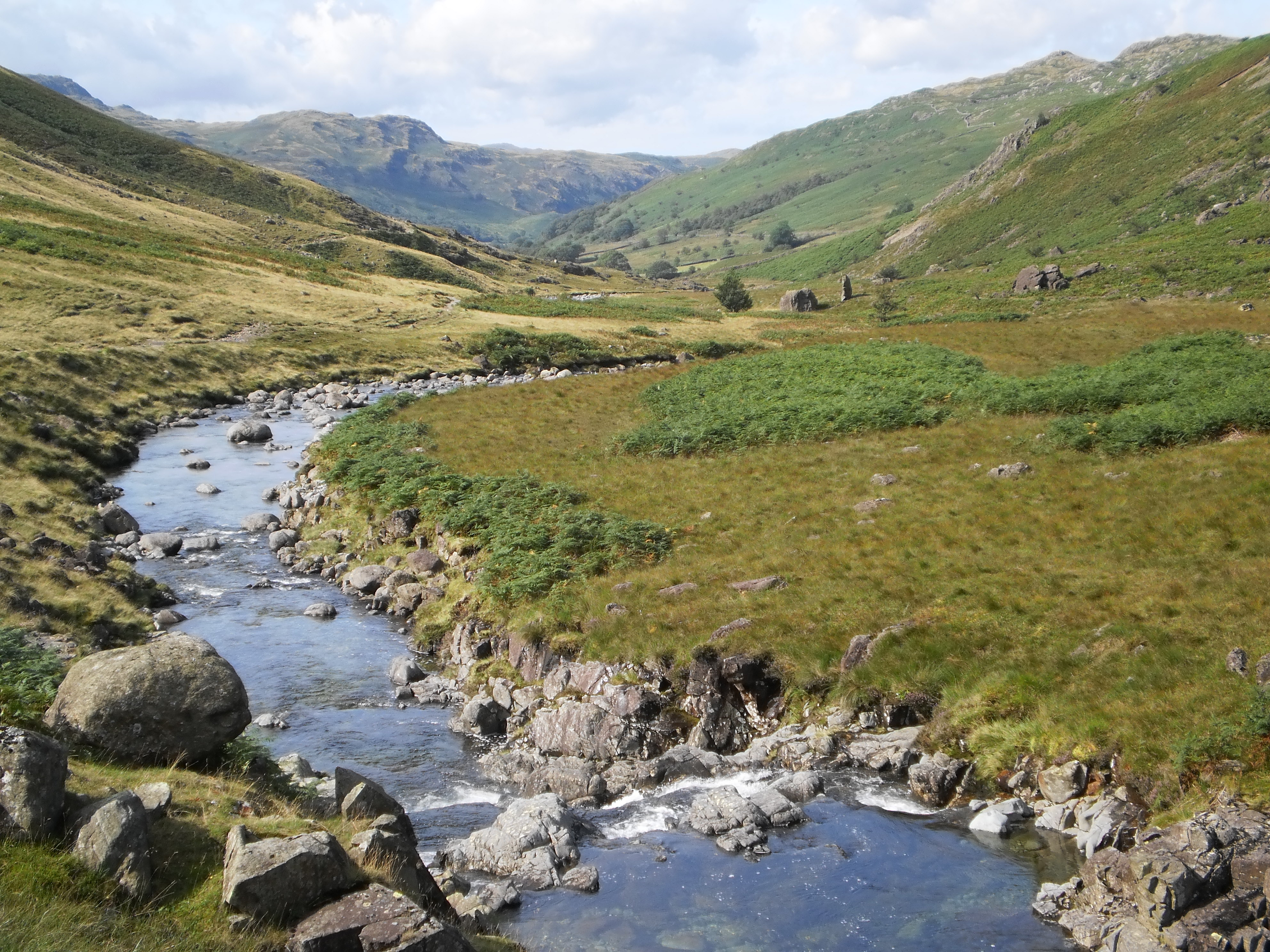
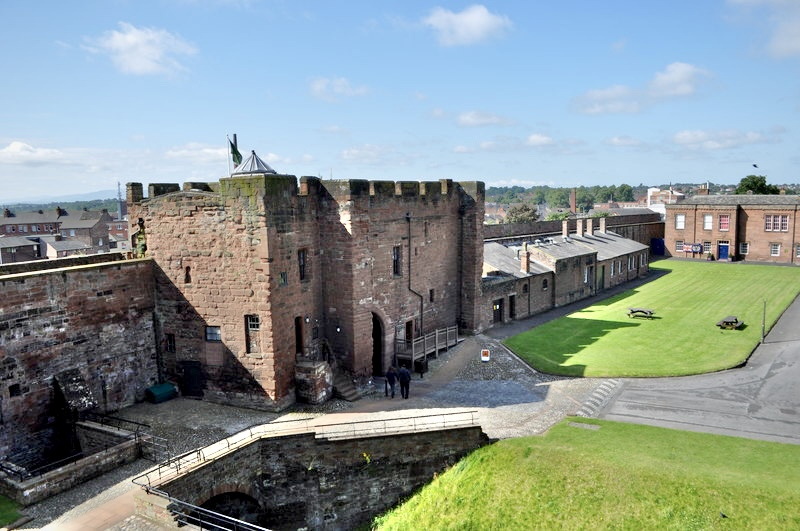
- Skiddaw; River Esk; Carlisle Castle

- Flag

- Area
  - 1831: 969,490 acres (3,923.4 km^{2})1831 Census cited in Vision of Britain – Ancient county data
  - 1911: 973,086 acres (3,937.94 km^{2})
  - 1961: 973,146 acres (3,938.18 km^{2})
  - Coordinates: 54°45′N 3°00′W
- Population
  - 1911: 265,746 Vision of Britain – Cumberland population (density and area)
  - 1961: 294,303
- Density
  - 1911: 0.27/acre (0.67/ha)
  - 1961: 0.3/acre (0.74/ha)
- History
  - Origin: Historic
  - Created: 12th Century
- Status: Historic county (current) Administrative county (1889–1974); Ceremonial county (until 1974)
- Chapman code: CUL
- Government: Cumberland County Council (1889–1974)
  - HQ: Carlisle
- Arms of Cumberland County Council
- Subdivisions
  - Type: Wards
  - Units: Cumberland; Eskdale; Allerdale Above Derwent; Allerdale Below Derwent; Leath

Cumberland (/ˈkʌmbərlənd/ KUM-bər-lənd) is an area of North West England which was historically a county. The county was bordered by Northumberland to the north-east, County Durham to the east, Westmorland to the south-east, Lancashire to the south, and the Scottish counties of Dumfriesshire and Roxburghshire to the north. The county included the city of Carlisle, part of the Lake District and North Pennines, and the Solway Firth coastline.

Cumberland had an administrative function from the 12th century until 1974, when it was subsumed into the non-metropolitan county of Cumbria together with Westmorland and parts of Yorkshire and Lancashire. In 2023, the non-metropolitan county of Cumbria was dissolved and a new unitary authority area of Cumberland was created, which has similar boundaries to the historic county of Cumberland but excludes Penrith.

== Early history ==
In the Early Middle Ages, Cumbria was part of the Kingdom of Strathclyde in the Hen Ogledd, or "Old North", and its people spoke a Brittonic language now called Cumbric. The first record of the term Cumberland appears in AD 945, when the Anglo-Saxon Chronicle recorded that the area was ceded to Malcolm I, king of Alba (Scotland), by King Edmund I of England. As with Cymru, the native Welsh name for Wales, the names Cumberland and Cumbria are derived from kombroges in Common Brittonic, which originally meant 'compatriots'.

At the time of the Domesday Book (AD 1086) most of the future county was part of Scotland, although some villages around Millom, which were the possessions of the Earl of Northumbria, had been incorporated into Yorkshire.

In AD 1092, King William Rufus of England invaded the Carlisle district, settling it with colonists. He created an Earldom of Carlisle, and granted the territory to Ranulf le Meschin. In 1133, Carlisle was made the see of a new diocese, largely identical with the area of the earldom. However, on the death of King Henry I of England in 1135, the area was regained by King David I of Scotland. He was able to consolidate his power and made Carlisle one of his chief seats of government, while England descended into a lengthy civil war. The Cumbric language is believed to have become extinct in the 12th century.

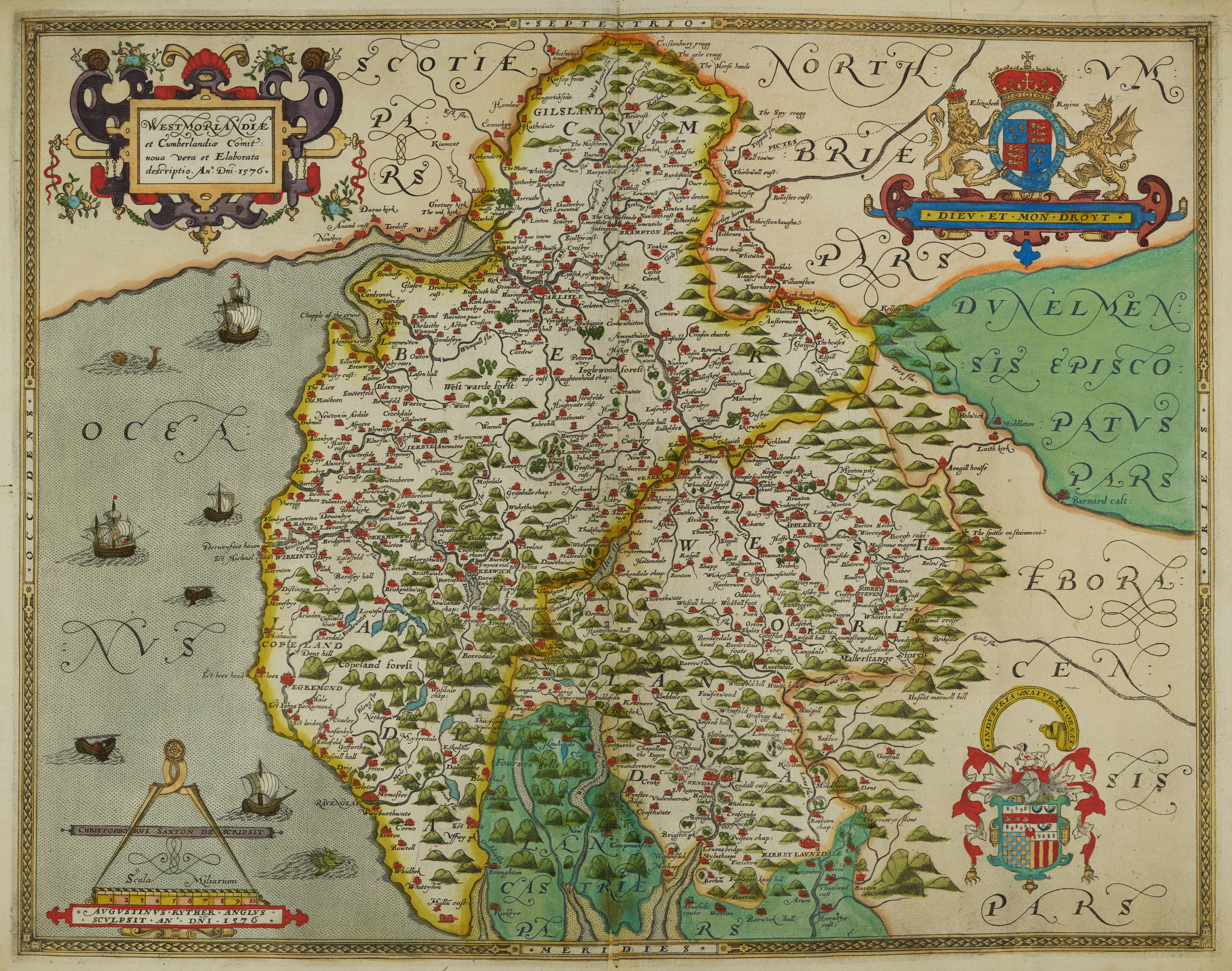
Hand-drawn map of Westmoreland and Cumberland by Christopher Saxton from 1576

The area returned to the English crown in 1157, when Henry II of England took possession of the area (from Malcolm IV of Scotland). Henry II formed two new counties from the former earldom: Westmorland and Carliol – originally an abbreviation of the Latin Carlioliensis '[bishop] of Carlisle'. Westmorland also included areas formerly part of the Earldom of Lancaster. The lead- and silver-mining area of Alston, previously associated with the Liberty of Tynedale was later also added to the new county of Carliol for financial reasons. By 1177, Carliol had become known as Cumberland. The border between England and Scotland was made permanent by the Treaty of York in 1237.

The population of Cumberland in the 1841 census was 178,038.

== Geography ==
The boundaries formed in the 12th century were not changed substantially over the county's existence. There are four English historic counties and two Scottish counties that it borders: Northumberland and County Durham to the east; Westmorland to the south, the Furness part of Lancashire to the southwest; Dumfriesshire to the north and Roxburghshire to the northeast.

To the west the county is bounded by the Solway Firth and the Irish Sea. The northern boundary is formed by the Solway Estuary and the border with Scotland running east to Scotch Knowe at Kershope Burn. The boundary runs south from Scotch Knowe along the Cheviot Hills, then followed a tributary of the River Irthing and crossed Denton Fell to the River Tees. From Tees Head the boundary crosses the Pennines to descend Crowdundale Beck, from where it followed the rivers Eden and Eamont to the centre of Ullswater. The line follows Glencoin Beck to the top of Helvellyn ridge at Wrynose Pass and along the River Duddon (near Millom) to the sea .

The highest point of the county is Scafell Pike, at 3,208 feet (978 m), the highest mountain in England. Carlisle is the county town.

=== Sub-divisions ===
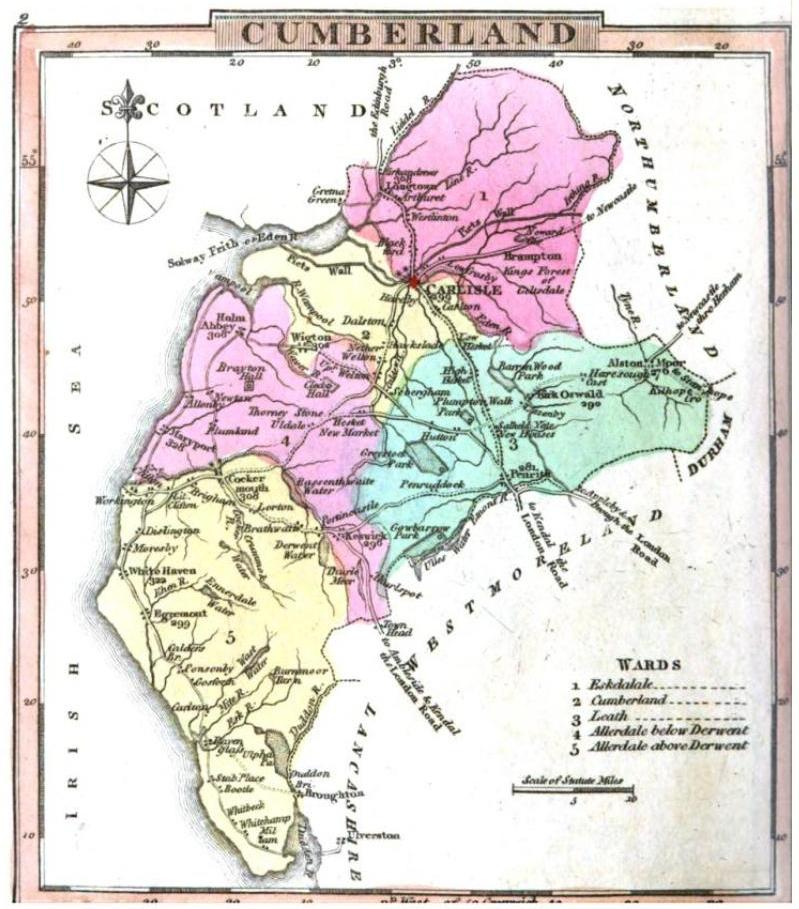
Map of Cumberland showing wards, 1824

The Earldom of Carlisle was partitioned into baronies. When the County of Cumberland was created, the baronies were subdivided as wards, a county sub-division also used in Durham, Northumberland and Westmorland. These originated as military subdivisions used to organise the male inhabitants for the county's defence from Scottish troop incursions.

Each ward was composed of a number of parishes, areas originally formed for ecclesiastical administration. In common with other northern England counties, many ancient parishes in Cumberland were very large, often consisting of a number of distinct townships and hamlets. Many of these ancient parishes eventually became civil parishes and form the lowest level of local government.

==== Allerdale above Derwent ====
Parishes	Notes
Arlecdon	
Beckermet St John	Included part of township of Calder & Beckermet or Calderbridge
Beckermet St Bridget	Included townships of Ennerdale & Kinniside, Eskdale & Wasdale
Bootle	
Brigham	Included townships of Blindbothel, Buttermere, Cockermouth, Eaglesfield, Embleton, Greysouthen, Mosser, Setmurthey, Whinfell
Cleator	
Corney	
Crosthwaite (part)	Included township of Borrowdale
Dean	
Drigg and Carlton	
Egremont	
Gosforth	Included township of Bolton
Haile	
Harrington	
Irton with Santon	Included township of Santon & Murthwaite
Lamplugh	Included townships of Kelton & Winder, Murton
Lorton	Included townships of Brackenthwaite, Wythop
Loweswater	
Millom	Included hamlet of Birker with Austhwaite, township of Ulpha
Moresby	Included township of Parton
Muncaster	
Ponsonby	Included part of township of Calder & Beckermet or Calderbridge
St Bees	Include townships of Hensingham, Lowside Quarter, Netherwasdale, Preston Quarter, Rottington, Sandwith, Wheddicarr, Whitehaven
Waberthwaite	
Whicham	
Whitbeck	
Workington	Included townships of Great Clifton, Little Clifton, Stainburn, Winscales

==== Allerdale below Derwent ====
Parishes	Notes
Allhallows	
Aspatria	Including townships of Hayton & Mealo, Oughterside & Allerby
Bassenthwaite	
Bolton	Including townships of Bolton Gate, Bolton Wood & Quarry Hill, Bolton Lowside, Isel Old Park, Sunderland
Bridekirk	Including townships of Dovenby, Great Broughton, Little Broughton
Bromfield (part)	Including townships of Allonby, Langrigg & Mealrigg, Papcastle, Tallentire, Westnewton
Caldbeck (part)	
Camerton	Including township of Seaton
Crosscanonby	Including townships of Birkby & Canonby, Blennerhasset & Kirkland, Crosby, Maryport
Crosthwaite (part)	Included townships of Castlerigg St John's & Wythburn, Keswick, Ribton, Underskiddaw
Dearham	Including township of Ellenborough & Ewanrigg
Flimby	
Gilcrux	
Holme Cultram	Including townships of Abbey Quarter (or Holme Abbey), Holme East Waver Quarter, Holme St Cuthbert's Quarter, Holme Low Quarter
Ireby	Including townships of High Ireby, Low Ireby
Isel	Including township of Blindcrake and Redmain
Plumbland	
Torpenhow	Including townships of Bewaldeth and Snittlegarth, Bothel & Thrupland
Uldale	
West Ward	

==== Eskdale ====
Parishes	Notes
Arthuret	Included townships of Braconhill, Lineside, Longtown, Netherby
Bewcastle	
Brampton	
Castle Carrock	
Crosby	High & Low
Cumrew	Outside and Inside
Cumwhitton	Included township of Northsceugh
East Farlam	
Hayton	Included townships of Little Crosby, Fenton & Faugh, Talkin
Irthington	Included townships of Kingwater, Laversdale, Newby, Newtown
Kingmoor (hamlet)	Extra-parochial liberty belonging to the Corporation of Carlisle
Kirkandrews upon Esk	Included townships of Kirkandrews Moat, Kirkandrews Nether Quarter, Kirkandrews Upper Quarter, Nichol Forest
Kirklinton	Included townships of Hethersgill, Westlinton (or Levington)
Lanercost	Included townships of Askerton, Burtholme & Banks, Lineside
Nether Denton	
Scaleby	East and West
Stanwix	
Stapleton	Included townships of Belbank, Solport Quarter, Trough
Upper Denton	
Walton	High and Low
West Farlam	

==== Leath ====
Parishes	Notes
Addingham	Included townships of Gamblesby, Glassonby, Hunsonby & Winskill
Ainstable and Rushcroft	
Alston with Garrigill	Included the Chapelry of Garrigill
Caldbeck (part)	Township of Mosedale
Carlisle, St Mary's (part)	Township of Middlesceugh & Braithwaite
Castle Sowerby	
Croglin	
Dacre	
Edenhall	Included township of Langwathby
Great Salkeld	
Greystoke	Included townships of Berrier & Murrah, Bowscale, Hutton John, Hutton Roof, Hutton Soil, Matterdale, Mungrisdale, Threlkeld, Watermillock
Hesket in the Forest	
Hutton in the Forest	
Kirkland	Included townships of Culgaith, Kirkland & Blencarn
Kirkoswald	Included township of Staffield
Lazonby	Included township of Plumpton Wall
Melmerby	
Newton Reigny	Included township of Catterlen
Ousby	
Penrith	
Renwick	
Skirwith	

==== Cumberland Ward ====
Cumberland Ward included Carlisle and Wigton as well as parts of Inglewood Forest. The parish of Stanwix just to the north of Carlisle was partly in both Eskdale and Cumberland wards.

Parishes	Notes
Aikton	
Beaumont	
Bowness	Included townships of Anthorn, Drumburg, Fingland
Bromfield (part)	Included townships of Blencogo, Dundraw
Burgh by Sands	
Carlisle, St Mary's (part)*	Townships of Caldewgate Quarter, Cummersdale Quarter, Wreay
Carlisle St Mary Within*	Included township of Rickergate Quarter
Carlisle St Cuthbert's Within*	
Carlisle St Cuthbert's Without*	
Dalston	
Eaglesfield Abbey*	
Grinsdale	
Kirkandrews upon Eden	
Kirkbampton	
Kirkbride	
Orton	Included township of Baldwinholme
Rockcliffe	
Sebergham	Low and High Quarters
Thursby	
Warwick	
Wetheral	
Wigton	Included townships of Oulton Water, Waverton High & Low, Woodside Quarter

* Parts or all of these parishes and townships constituted the City of Carlisle, and were largely outside the jurisdiction of Cumberland Ward.

== Local government from the 19th century ==
During the 19th century a series of reforms reshaped the local government of the county, creating a system of districts with directly elected councils.

=== Poor law and municipal reform ===
Map of Cumberland in 1845 showing poor law unions and parliamentary divisions

The first changes concerned the administration of the poor law, which was carried at parish level. The Poor Law Amendment Act 1834 provided for the grouping of parishes into poor law unions, each with a central workhouse and an elected board of guardians. Cumberland was divided into nine unions: Alston with Garrigill, Bootle, Brampton, Carlisle, Cockermouth, Longtown, Penrith, Whitehaven and Wigton.

In the following year the Municipal Corporations Act 1835 was passed, reforming boroughs and cities in England and Wales as municipal boroughs with a uniform constitution. The corporation of the City of Carlisle was accordingly remodelled with a popularly elected council consisting of a mayor, aldermen and councillors.

=== Local boards and sanitary districts ===
Outside of municipal boroughs, there was no effective local government until the 1840s. In response to poor sanitary conditions and outbreaks of cholera, the Public Health Act 1848 (11 & 12 Vict. c. 63) and the Local Government Act 1858 allowed for the formation of local boards of health in populous areas. Local boards were responsible among other things for water supply, drainage, sewerage, paving and cleansing. Eleven local boards were initially formed at Brampton, Cleator Moor, Cockermouth, Egremont, Holme Cultram, Keswick, Maryport, Millom, Penrith, Whitehaven, Wigton and Workington.

Further reform under the Public Health Act 1875 (38 & 39 Vict. c. 55) saw the creation of sanitary districts throughout England and Wales. The existing municipal boroughs and local boards became "urban sanitary districts", while "rural sanitary districts" were formed from the remaining areas of the poor law unions.

Three more local boards were formed: Arlecdon and Frizington in 1882, Harrington in 1891 and Aspatria in 1892. In addition Workington and Whitehaven received charters of incorporation to become municipal boroughs in 1883 and 1894 respectively.

=== Local government acts of 1888 and 1894 ===
In 1889, under the Local Government Act 1888, the Cumberland County Council was created as the county council for Cumberland, taking over administrative functions from the Court of Quarter Sessions. The Local Government Act 1894 reconstituted the existing sanitary districts as urban districts and rural districts, each with an elected council.

The Local Government Act 1888 also allowed any municipal borough with a population of 50,000 people or more to become a "county borough", independent of county council control. In 1914, Carlisle successfully applied for this status, ceasing to form part of the administrative county, although remaining within Cumberland for the purposes such as lieutenancy and shrievalty.

=== Reform in 1934 ===
The Local Government Act 1929 imposed the duty on county councils of reviewing the districts within their administrative county so as to form more efficient units of local government. In general, this meant the merging of small or lightly populated areas into larger units. A review was carried in Cumberland in 1934. The following table lists the urban and rural districts before and after the changes.

District 1894–1934	District 1934–1974
Alston with Garrigill RD
Arlecdon & Frizington UD	Part of Ennerdale RD
Aspatria UD	Absorbed by Wigton RD
Bootle RD	Part of Millom RD
Brampton RD	Part of Border RD
Carlisle RD	Part of Border RD
Cleator Moor UD	Part of Ennerdale RD
Cockermouth RD
Cockermouth UD
Egremont UD	Part of Ennerdale RD
Harrington UD	Absorbed by Workington MB
Holme Cultram UD	Absorbed by Wigton RD
Keswick UD
Longtown RD	Part of Border RD
Maryport UD
Penrith RD
Penrith UD
Whitehaven RD	Part of Ennerdale RD

Cumberland in 1960

The distribution of population in 1971 was as follows:1971 Census; Small Area Statistics

District	Population
County Borough of Carlisle	71,580
Cockermouth Urban District	6,366
Keswick Urban District	5,184
Maryport Urban District	11,612
Penrith Urban District	11,308
Municipal Borough of Whitehaven	26,721
Municipal Borough of Workington	28,431
Alston with Garrigill Rural District	1,917
Border Rural District	29,267
Cockermouth Rural District	21,520
Ennerdale Rural District	30,983
Millom Rural District	14,088
Penrith Rural District	11,380
Wigton Rural District	21,830

In 1974, under the Local Government Act 1972, the administrative county and county borough were abolished and their former area was combined with Westmorland and parts of Lancashire and the West Riding of Yorkshire to form the new county of Cumbria. The area from Cumberland went on to form the districts of Carlisle, Allerdale, Copeland and part of Eden.

== Legacy ==
The name continues in use as a geographical and cultural term, and it survives in Cumberland sausages; HMS Cumberland; the Cumberland Fell Runners Club; the Cumberland Athletics Club; and various organisations and companies, such as the local newspapers The Cumberland News, and The West Cumberland Times and Star, and the Cumberland Building Society. It is also mentioned in Macbeth as the kingdom given to Prince Malcolm, and is also the initial setting for the Geoffrey Trease historical novel Cue for Treason.

In June 1994, during the 1990s UK local government reform, the Local Government Commission published draft recommendations, suggesting as one option a North Cumbria unitary authority (also including Appleby, the historic county town of Westmorland). It also suggested that Cumberland could be reinstated as an independent ceremonial county. The final recommendations, published in October 1994, did not include such recommendations, apparently due to lack of expression of support for the proposal to the commission.

The Grass-of-Parnassus was the county flower. It had been associated with the county since 1951, when it was included in the coat of arms granted to the Cumberland County Council. It subsequently featured in the arms granted to Cumbria County Council and Copeland Borough Council, in both cases to represent Cumberland. The flower was also attributed to Cumbria in 2002 as part of a national County flowers of the United Kingdom campaign by the charity Plantlife. In 2012, a flag based on the arms of the former Cumberland County Council was registered as the flag of Cumberland with the Flag Institute.

In 2013, the Secretary of State for Communities and Local Government, Eric Pickles, formally recognised and acknowledged the continued existence of England's 39 historic counties, including Cumberland.

In 2021, it was announced that on 1 April 2023 local government in Cumbria would be reorganised into two unitary authorities, one of which is Cumberland and includes most of the historic county, with the exception of Penrith and the surrounding area. The new authority covers 77% of the area and 90% of the population of the historic county.

== See also ==
- List of Lord Lieutenants for Cumberland
- List of High Sheriffs for Cumberland
- Custos Rotulorum of Cumberland - Keepers of the Rolls
- List of MPs for Cumberland constituency
- Broughan (Cumberland surname)
