= Milecastle 70 =

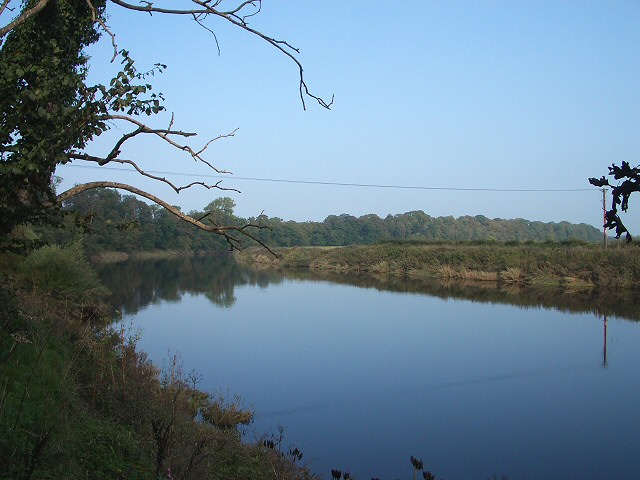
- Milecastle 70 lay next to the River Eden between Kirkandrews and Beaumont

- Location within the former City of Carlisle district Location within Cumbria
- 54.921328°N 3.01324°W
- Type: Milecastle
- Location: Cumbria, England

Milecastle 70 (Braelees) was one of a series of Milecastles or small fortlets built at intervals of approximately one Roman mile along Hadrian's Wall (grid reference NY35155898).

== Description ==
Milecastle 70 is thought to lie between the villages of Kirkandrews-on-Eden and Beaumont to the north of Cowen Bank by the River Eden. The precise location of the milecastle has not yet been found. The measured position is 300 metres north of Braelees towards Monkhill Beck. A geophysical survey in 2000 failed to locate it, and it may have been substantially or completely robbed of stone.

The line of Hadrian's Wall is said to have been confirmed in an excavation close to the site of the milecastle. To the south, at Braelees (NY35245881), many squared dressed stones are said to have been dug out of the garden by the gardener and used for a rockery. To the north, two fragments of what are thought to be the Wall ditch are visible either side of Monkhill Beck (NY35035916), where it survives to a depth of 2 metres, having been used over time as a farm track. To the southwest, a short section of the Vallum ditch, 110 metres in length (NY34745852 to NY34855849), is visible as a slight earthwork on air photographs.

In the early 19th century, part of a Roman cohort stone (RIB 2035) was found in the River Eden, and was placed in a wall at Beaumont (NY34805924). It commemorates the work of the fifth cohort of the Twentieth Legion. In 1934 a Roman altar was found in the footings of an old cottage being demolished at Beaumont (NY347593). The altar was dedicated to Jupiter and the presiding genius of the numerus of Aurelian Moors, Valerianus' and Gallienus' Own. In 1935, a Roman coin was found by a gardener at Braelees (NY35245881).

== Associated turrets ==
Each milecastle on Hadrian's Wall had two associated turret structures. These turrets were positioned approximately one-third and two-thirds of a Roman mile to the west of the Milecastle, and would probably have been manned by part of the milecastle's garrison. The turrets associated with Milecastle 70 are known as Turret 70A (grid reference NY34805929) and Turret 70B (grid reference NY34255930). None of the turrets between Milecastles 59 and 72 were sought or identified prior to 1961, and the exact locations of turrets 70A and 70B are uncertain.

There is no surface trace of Turret 70A. It is believed that Turret 70A is located at a point where Hadrian's Wall changed alignment, and the site is below the motte of the medieval Beaumont motte castle, in the village of Beaumont. Limited excavation in the churchyard extension to the west of the motte in 1928 found evidence of the buried remains of Hadrian's Wall.

Turret 70B is expected to be located about 540 metres west of St Mary's Church to the south of Milldikes Lane. In 1858 Henry Maclauchlan noted a "green spot" near a pond at near this location, and the green spot was still said to be visible in 1961.
