= Milecastle 69 =

Milecastle on Hadrian's Wall

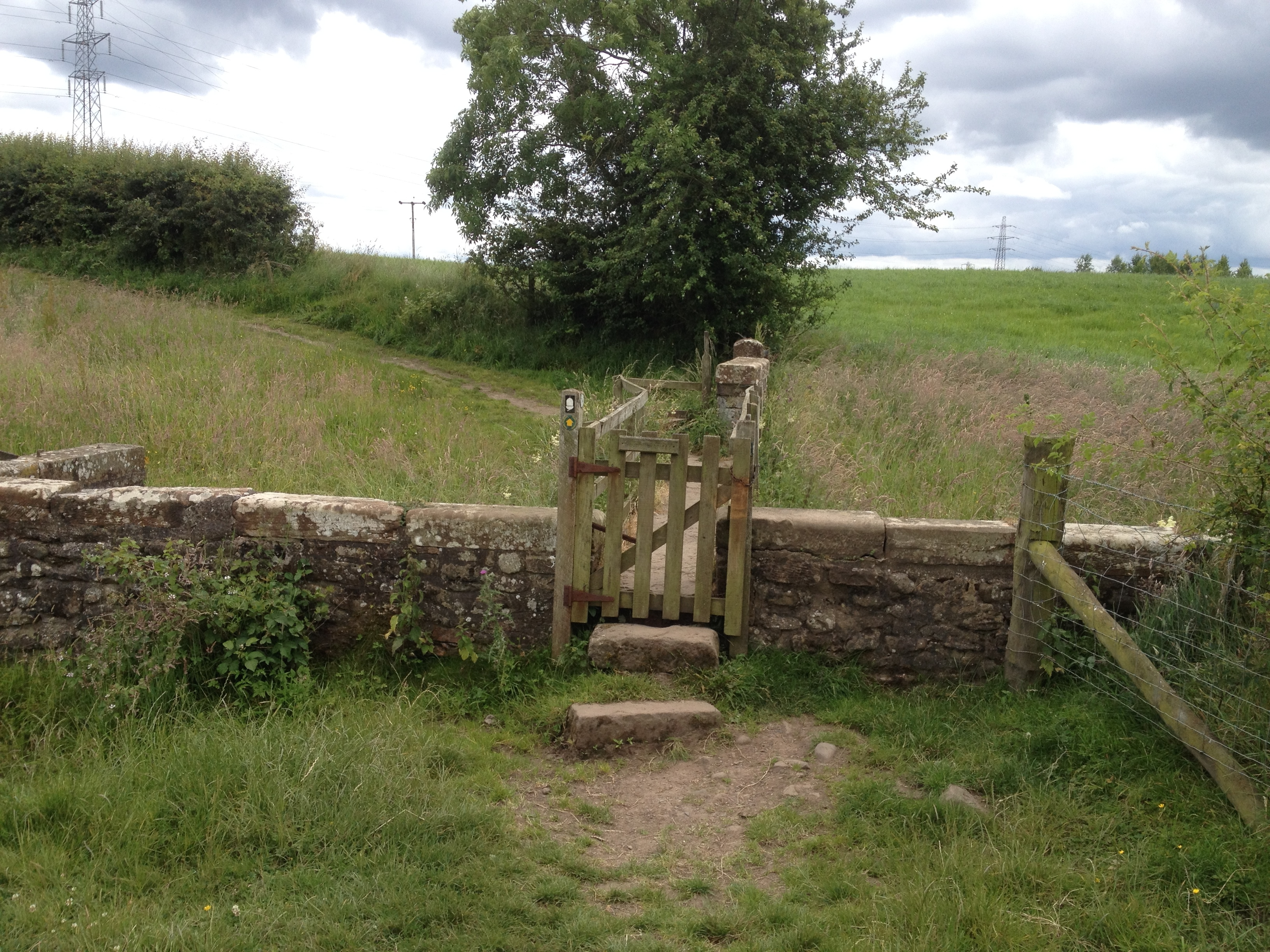
- Sourmilk Bridge (close to the site of Milecastle 69)

- Location within the former City of Carlisle district Location within Cumbria
- 54.913694°N 2.990897°W
- Type: Milecastle
- Location: Cumbria, England

Milecastle 69 (Sourmilk Bridge) was one of a series of Milecastles or small fortlets built at intervals of approximately one Roman mile along Hadrian's Wall (grid reference NY36575811).

== Description ==
Milecastle 69 is thought to lie near the small village of Grinsdale in the civil parish of Beaumont. The precise location of the milecastle has not yet been found. It probably lies somewhere between Sourmilk Bridge and the buildings of Park Farm to the west of Grinsdale. A survey of 1858 noted a quantity of foundation stones close to the stream at Sourmilk Bridge, but since a map of 1746 shows a mill on the east bank of Sourmilk Bridge, it is likely that the stones came from the demolished mill.

== Associated turrets ==
Each milecastle on Hadrian's Wall had two associated turret structures. These turrets were positioned approximately one-third and two-thirds of a Roman mile to the west of the Milecastle, and would probably have been manned by part of the milecastle's garrison. The turrets associated with Milecastle 69 are known as Turret 69A (grid reference NY360581) and Turret 69B (grid reference NY354584). None of the turrets between Milecastles 59 and 72 were sought or identified prior to 1961, and the exact locations of turrets 69A and 69B are uncertain.

Turret 69A probably lies midway between Sourmilk Bridge and where Holme Lane runs closest to the Wall. Turret 69B is probably located beneath the site of St Andrew's Church in the village of Kirkandrews-on-Eden.
