= Listed buildings in Beaumont, Cumbria =

Beaumont is a civil parish in the Cumberland district of Cumbria, England. It contains 26 listed buildings that are recorded in the National Heritage List for England. Of these, one is listed at Grade II*, the middle of the three grades, and the others are at Grade II, the lowest grade. The parish contains the settlements of Beaumont, Kirkandrews-upon-Eden, Monkhill, and Grinsdale, and is otherwise mainly rural. Most of the listed buildings are houses and associated structures, farmhouses and farm buildings. The other listed buildings include churches and associated structures, a former windmill, and a public house.

== Key ==
Grade	Criteria
II*	Particularly important buildings of more than special interest
II	Buildings of national importance and special interest

== Buildings ==
Name and location	Photograph	Date	Notes	Grade
St Mary's Church; 54.92405°N 3.01876°W		Late 12th century	The church was restored in 1784, 1872 and 1888. It is built in calciferous sandstone and red sandstone on a chamfered plinth, and has a green slate roof with coped gables and a cross finial. It consists of a nave, a south porch, a chancel and a north vestry. On the west gable is an open bellcote. At the entrance to the church is a re-used Norman arch.	II*
The Croft; 54.91553°N 3.00712°W	—	Late 17th century	Originally a farmhouse, it is built in clay and cobble on a chamfered stone plinth, and has a thatched roof. It has a single storey with an attic, and there is a single-storey extension to the rear added in 1778. The doorway and sash windows have plain stone surrounds, and in the extension is a dated lintel. Inside are three pairs of full crucks.	II
George Sibson Tomb Chest; 54.91301°N 2.98054°W	—	1715	The tomb chest is in the churchyard of St Kentigern's Church. It is in sandstone, and is rectangular on a chamfered plinth. On the sides are plain panels, and the slab has a chamfered moulded edge. On the slab are carved coats of arms and inscriptions.	II
John Sibson Tomb Chest; 54.91301°N 2.98064°W	—	1734	The tomb chest is in the churchyard of St Kentigern's Church. It is in sandstone, and is rectangular on a chamfered plinth. On the sides are plain panels, and the slab has a chamfered moulded edge. On the slab are inscriptions dated up to 1901.	II
Barn, Manor House; 54.91578°N 3.00879°W	—	Early to mid 18th century	The barn is built in clay, with repairs in brick and cobbles, and a roof of sandstone slabs. It is in a single storey, and has plank doors in a projecting cart entrance.	II
St Kentigern's Church; 54.91306°N 2.98044°W		1738–40	The church was rebuilt on old foundations. It is a small church, it is rendered on a stone plinth, and it has a green slate roof with coped gables and a cross finial. The church consists of a nave, a chancel, and a west tower. The tower has two stages, slit vents, louvred bell openings in a sandstone arch, and a battlemented parapet.	II
Beech House; 54.91624°N 3.01057°W	—	Mid 18th century	The house is in brick with quoins and a green slate roof. There are two storeys, three bays, and sash windows in moulded architraves.	II
Hollow Creek; 54.91526°N 3.00744°W	—	Mid 18th century	A brick farmhouse with a roof of Welsh slate and sandstone slate, in two storeys and three bays. The doorway has a plain surround, and the sash windows have moulded architraves.	II
Knockupworth Hall; 54.89981°N 2.98299°W	—	Late 18th century	A stuccoed house on a chamfered plinth, with quoins and a green slate roof. There are two storeys and three bays, with a two-storey one-bay extension to the left. On the front is a prostyle Roman Doric porch, and the doorway has a moulded architrave. The windows are sashes in moulded surrounds.	II
The Manor House; 54.91563°N 3.00824°W	—	Late 18th century	The main part of the house is in brick with a Welsh slate roof. It has two storeys and three bays. There is a lower two-storey, one-bay extension to the left, and a two-storey wing at the rear, giving an L-shaped plan. In the main part, the original entrance has been converted into a French window; it has an architrave and a moulded and dentilled cornice. The windows are sashes that have segmental arches with keystones and stone sills. The left extension also has quoins, and the rear wing has a ground floor of split river cobbles.	II
Outbuilding, The Manor House; 54.91581°N 3.00838°W	—	Late 18th century	The building is constructed in split river cobbles with sandstone quoins and it has a sandstone slate roof. There are two storeys, two bays, and a two-bay extension. In the main part are a plank door and a loft door, both with quoined surrounds, and in the extension is a garage door and a casement window.	II
Monkhill Windmill; 54.91752°N 3.02643°W		Late 18th century	The former windmill is conical, with three storeys, and is built in sandstone. There are two ground floor entrances with wooden lintels, and windows at three levels.	II
Myrtle Cottage; 54.92497°N 3.01885°W	—	Late 18th century	The house is built in river cobbles and random rubble, with quoins and a slate roof. There are two storeys and three bays, with a one-bay extension on each side. The doorway and sash windows have plain surrounds.	II
Orchard House; 54.92459°N 3.01774°W	—	Late 18th century	A house in red and yellow sandstone on a chamfered stone plinth, with quoins, a moulded cornice, and a slate roof. There are two storeys and three bays, and a single-storey single-bay rendered extension to the right. The windows in the main part of the house are sashes, and in the extension they are casements.	II
Park Farmhouse; 54.91279°N 2.98596°W	—	1777	The farmhouse is rendered, with a slate roof, and has two storeys and three bays. The doorway has a pilastered surround, moulded impost blocks, a patterned fanlight with a segmental arch, and a dated and inscribed false keystone. The windows are sashes in moulded architraves.	II
Eden Bank Farmhouse; 54.92365°N 3.01803°W	—	1796	The front of the farmhouse is stuccoed, and the rear is in cobbles and sandstone. It has a chamfered plinth, quoins, and a greenslate roof. There are two storeys and three bays. The doorway has a radial fanlight with a pilastered surround, a moulded segmental arch, and a false keystone. The windows are sashes in moulded architraves.	II
Bunkershill; 54.88279°N 2.98711°W	—	1797 (probable)	Originally one house and stables, later converted into three dwellings, it is rendered on a chamfered plinth, and has quoins, a moulded cornice and parapet, and a hipped green slate roof. There are two storeys and eleven bays, the right three bays having been the stables. The doorway has an architrave, side windows, and a moulded triangular pediment. On the front are two canted bay windows, the other windows being sashes in architraves. There are also doorways towards the left and in the right return.	II
Beaumont House; 54.92349°N 3.01991°W	—	Late 18th or early 19th century	The house is in brick on a stone plinth, with quoins and a green slate roof. There are two storeys, three bays, a doorway with a plain surround and a fanlight with a segmental arch and a false keystone, and sash windows with flat brick arches and stone sills.	II
The Beeches; 54.91622°N 3.01043°W	—	Late 18th or early 19th century	A brick house with a green slate roof, in two storeys and three bays. The doorway has a moulded surround with impost blocks, and a fanlight with a segmental head and a false keystone. The windows are sashes in plain surrounds.	II
Dovecote; 54.88330°N 2.98801°W	—	Late 18th or early 19th century	The dovecote is in mixed river cobbles and sandstone rubble, and has a Welsh slate roof. It is circular and has two storeys, plank doors and a loft door. Inside there are about 500 brick alcoves for nesting.	II
Park Farm Cottage and barn 54.91287°N 2.98581°W	—	1805	The cottage and barn are in brick on a plinth of cobble and sandstone, with stone dressings and a slate roof. In the centre is a flattened segmental arch with a dated keystone and a quoined surround. The cottage to the left has two storeys, three bays, a doorway with a stone surround, and sash windows that have stone sills and stone lintels with false keystones. The former cottage to the right of the arch has been incorporated into the barn which extends at right angles to the rear. The barn contains a cart entrance and a plank door.	II
Drover's Rest; 54.91805°N 3.02382°W		Early 19th century	A public house, with the main part in brick and former stables to the right mainly in cobbles, all with a green slate roof. It has two storeys, the main part has two bays, and there is a single-storey single-bay lean-to at the left. The doorway has a plain stone surround, and the windows are casements.	II
Wall, Drover's Rest; 54.91794°N 3.02382°W	—	Early 19th century	The low wall in front of the public house is in sandstone, it has rounded coping, and it curves at both ends. Between the wall and the road is a cobbled area.	II
Grinsdale House; 54.91216°N 2.98690°W	—	Early 19th century	A rendered house with eaves modillions and a green slate roof. It has two storeys, three bays, a doorway and sash windows with plain surrounds, and a moulded cornice above the door.	II
Hillcrest; 54.92348°N 3.01899°W	—	Early 19th century	A stuccoed house with a Welsh slate roof. It has two storeys and three bays, flanked by recessed one-bay extensions. The sash windows and the doorway have plain surrounds, and above the door is a fanlight and a moulded cornice.	II
Churchyard wall, St Mary's Church; 54.92410°N 3.01839°W		1897	The wall encloses the south and east sides of the churchyard. It is in mixed sandstone rubble and cobbles with chamfered sandstone coping. There are two openings, each has square gate posts with shaped caps, and one has a wrought iron overthrow.	II
