= Kirkoswald Castle =

Castle in Cumbria, England

- Kirkoswald, Cumbria, England
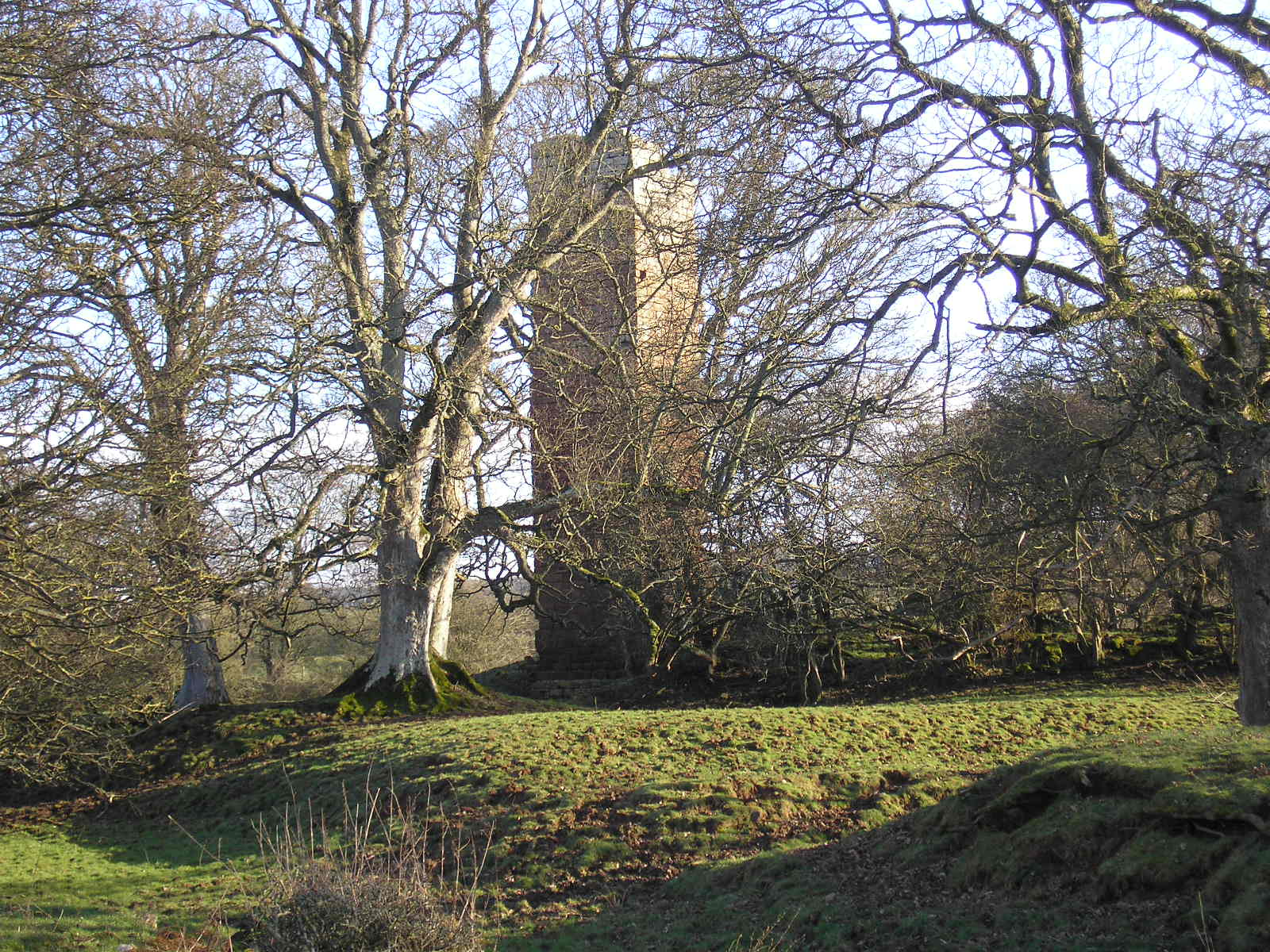
- The remains of Kirkoswald Castle

Site information
- Type: Fortified manor house

Location
- Location in Eden, Cumbria Location in Cumbria, England
- Coordinates: 54.7620°N 2.6863°W
- Grid reference: grid reference NY559410

Site history
- Materials: Red sandstone

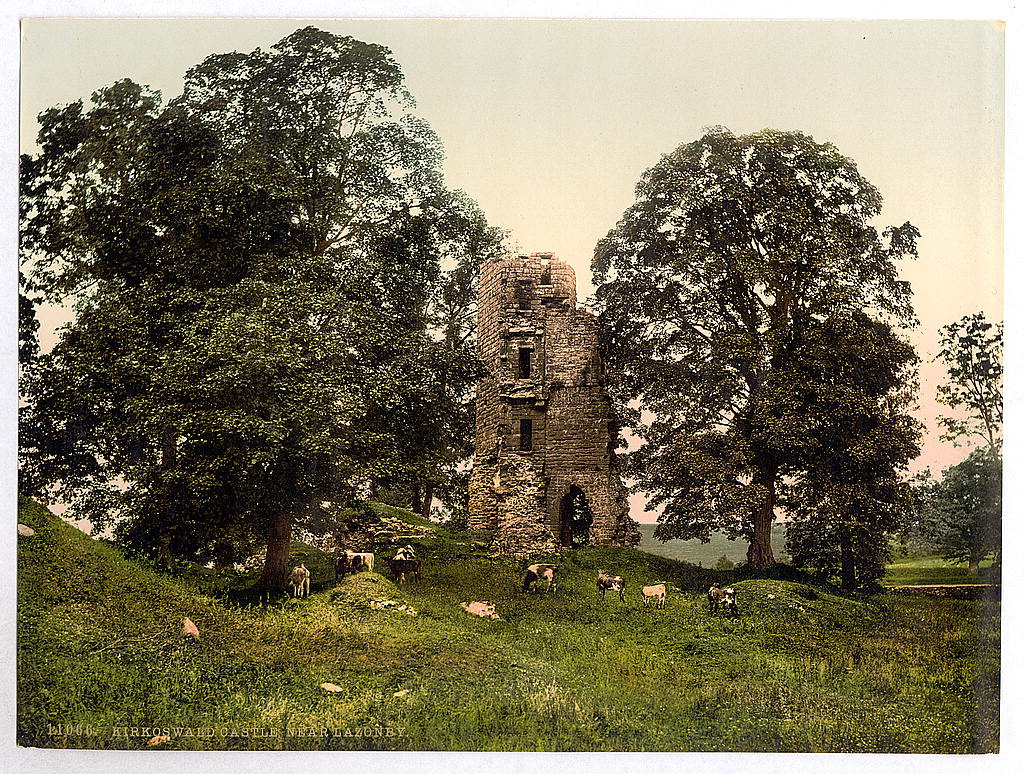
Kirkoswald Castle, photo circa 1895

Kirkoswald Castle is located to the southeast of the village of Kirkoswald, Cumbria, England. It is built from Penrith red sandstone and is still partially standing.

== History ==
A royal licence to crenellate a manor house standing on the site (belonging to Hugh de Morvile) was granted by King John in 1201. In 1314 it was destroyed by the Scots and rebuilt 3 years later in 1317. In 1485 it was greatly expanded and a moat was added. After the death of Thomas Dacre, 2nd Baron Dacre in 1525 the stained glass, panelling and beamed ceilings were moved to Naworth Castle.

It was dismantled between 1610 and 1688.

The castle was first listed on 27 December 1967.

== Present Condition ==
The site exists on farm land with the moat and some of the buildings, including a tower, still visible. A public footpath runs next to the site, which can be visited when the gate is unlocked.

The ruins are recorded in the National Heritage List for England as a designated Grade II listed building, and the ruins together with the moated site on which they stand are a Scheduled Monument.

== See also ==
- Listed buildings in Kirkoswald, Cumbria
- Castles in Great Britain and Ireland
- List of castles in England
