= Melmerby, Cumbria =

Village and civil parish in Cumbria, England

Coordinates: 54.73100°N 2.59937°W

Melmerby
- Village and civil parish
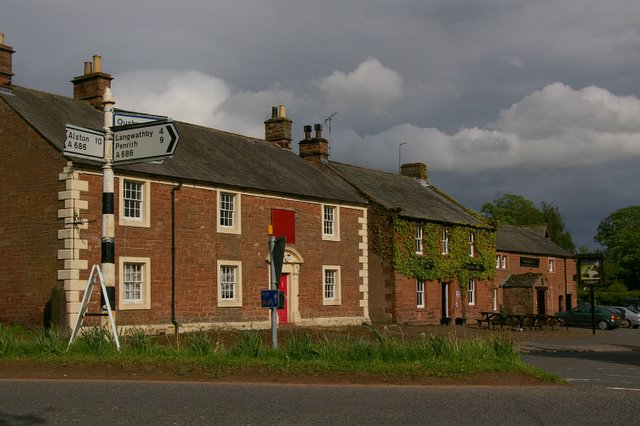
- Old Post Office and Pub, Melmerby

- Location in the former Eden District Location within Cumbria
- OS grid reference: NY615375
- Civil parish: Melmerby
- Unitary authority: Westmorland and Furness
- Ceremonial county: Cumbria
- Region: North West
- Country: England
- Sovereign state: United Kingdom
- Post town: PENRITH
- Postcode district: CA10
- Dialling code: 01768
- Police: Cumbria
- Fire: Cumbria
- Ambulance: North West
- UK Parliament: Penrith and Solway

Melmerby is a village and civil parish in Cumbria, England. It is a small village with a population of around 200. The village is 9 miles to the east of Penrith, which is a thriving community with immediate access to Junction 40 of the M6 motorway and a main-line railway station serving London, Manchester, Edinburgh and Glasgow. Surrounded by verdant countryside, Melmerby sits between the North Pennines with its highest point Cross Fell to the east, and the World Heritage Lake District National Park 10 miles to the west. The River Eden is bridged about 4 miles (6.4 km) away at Langwathby, and Long Meg and Her Daughters, the 3,500-year-old stone circle – the second largest in the country – is nearby at Little Salkeld. In 1931 the parish had a population of 175.

== Governance ==
On 1 April 1934 the parish was merged into Ousby, on 1 April 2019 Melmerby became a separate parish again.

== History ==
Melmerby is supposed to have taken its name from the residence of Máel Muire, a presumed Norse-Gael who lived nearby in the 9th century. The most significant historic buildings surviving in the village today are the 13th-century church of St John the Baptist and the Grade II Listed Melmerby Hall, begun as a defensive structure in the early 14th century. A petition received by Edward II between 1320 and 1326 reads:

"John le Denum petitions the King that whereas he has a castle in Cumberland called Melmerby Tower, which could be kept by a dozen men at arms, he has kept it until now and has often been assailed by the Scots to their great loss, and John's lands are so devastated there and elsewhere that he can no longer bear the expense. He craves help in the form of wages or otherwise until times change, because all the country around would suffer great loss peril and loss if it were taken through lack of garrison."

The hall, built from the local red sandstone, was extended in the 17th century and again in the 18th century in a Georgian style. The 20-acre (81,000 m^{2}) grounds include an archery lawn, walled vegetable gardens, a Victorian castle folly and wooded areas. Features inside include a priest hole and a large inglenook fireplace.

== Modern Melmerby ==
Village residents formed a consumer co-operative and opened a village shop in 2005, which was featured on the BBC's Working Lunch. The shop closed in 2008, but reopened as of 2016.

The area is popular with ramblers. Melmerby Fell is very close and Cross Fell, the highest part of the Pennines, is only three or four miles (6 km) away.

The A686 road passes through the village, and was described in AA Magazine by travel journalist Phil Llewellin:

"England's great wilderness sprawls across the northern Pennines, where the mountains have fascinating names such as Fiend's Fell and Wildboar Fell. Penrith merits a visit after leaving the M6, and memories of the motorway fade as the A686 crosses the River Eden valley. The mood changes dramatically in Melmerby, where the road starts its long climb to the cafe at the top of Hartside Summit, 1,903 feet (580 m) above sea level, with stunning views of the Solway Firth and Scotland.
The road leads to Alston, which claims to be England's highest market town, a charming little place with cobbled streets and quaint buildings. The A686 beyond Alston crosses another breathtaking expanse of windswept upland before running down to the River Allen's beautiful wooded gorge."

Melmerby Fell is a prominent feature of the area.

== See also ==
- Listed buildings in Ousby
