= Broughan =

The Broughan family has a long history including earls, knights and paupers. The first referenced history of the Broughan family occurs during the Norman invasion of England, wherein a family of engineers called Broughan were shipped to England during the conquest to assist in defense destruction. The name itself most likely derives from the old English or French word "Brun," originally a nickname for a person who had brown eyes, hair or even dressed habitually in brown. It is also possible that the name is from the Germanic "Brunwine" or "Brungar."

First known to be seated in Cumberland, the Broughan family today is scattered throughout the world, with known members in England, Australia, Ireland, America and France. Members of note include Tommy Broughan (b. August 1947, Irish politician).
