= Grinsdale =

Village in Cumbria, England

Coordinates: 54.912°N 2.986°W

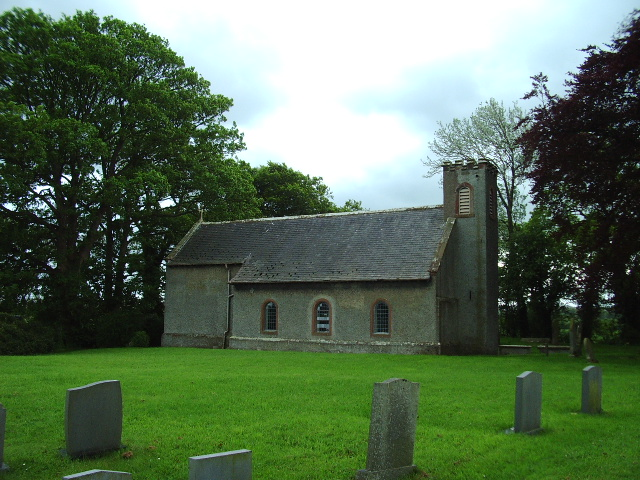
- St Kentigern's Church

- Location in the former Carlisle district, Cumbria Location within Cumbria
- OS grid reference: NY367579
- Civil parish: Beaumont
- Unitary authority: Cumberland
- Ceremonial county: Cumbria
- Region: North West
- Country: England
- Sovereign state: United Kingdom
- Post town: CARLISLE
- Postcode district: CA5
- Dialling code: 01228
- Police: Cumbria
- Fire: Cumbria
- Ambulance: North West
- UK Parliament: Carlisle

Grinsdale is a village and former civil parish, now in the civil parish of Beaumont, in the Cumberland district, in the ceremonial county of Cumbria, England, historically in Cumberland. Grinsdale has a church called St Kentigern's Church. It is the source of the surname. It is also beside the River Eden. The civil parish was merged into Beaumont on 1 April 1934. In 1931 the civil parish had a population of 161.

Grinsdale lies beside the river Eden near Carlisle. Four Roman military marching camps were set up in the area. The rich loamy soil encouraged farming around Grinsdale. Linen manufacture and weaving once provided employment in the hamlet.

Grinsdale's church, St Kentigern, was built in 1740 outside the village and just above the river on the site where a 12th-century church once stood. It has a small west tower, a three-bay nave, and a two-bay chancel with arched windows. The church was restored in 1895.

This place gave name to a family who held Grinsdale under the Barony of Burgh. The elder line failed about King John's time, when the co-heiresses married Newton and Le-Sor. Newton's lands passed by successive marriages to Martindale and Dacre, and having been forfeited to the crown, were granted to Whitmore, and passed by sale to the Dacre family of Kirklinton. A younger brother continued the male line of the family of Grinsdale, and some of his posterity represented the city and the county in parliament. This branch became extinct about the reign of Henry IV when the co-heiresses sold their lands in Grinsdale to the Dentons, of whom they were purchased by the Lowthers about the year 1686. This estate passed to the Earl of Lonsdale, who was lord paramount of the manor, as parcel of his Barony of Burgh.

The church of Grinsdale was given by Hugh de Morville to the priory of Lanercost, and became appropriated to that monastery. King Edward VI granted the rectory of Grinsdale to Sir Thomas Dacre; the great tithes were sold by the Dacre family in 1751, to the respective landholders. The church, which had been many years totally in ruins, was rebuilt about the year 1743 by Joseph Dacre at his own expense.

The Hadrian's Wall Path passes the church, on its way from Carlisle to Bowness-on-Solway via Kirkandrews-on-Eden, Beaumont, Cumbria and Burgh-by-Sands. The site of Milecastle 69 on Hadrian's Wall is thought to lie close to the village.

== See also ==
- Listed buildings in Beaumont, Cumbria
