= Kirkland, Culgaith =

Village in Cumbria, England

Coordinates: 54.686°N 2.547°W

Kirkland
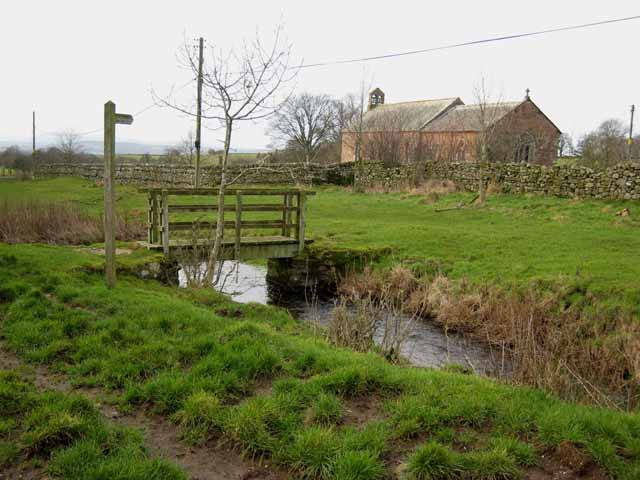
- Kirkland Church in January 2008

- Location in former Eden District, Cumbria Location within Cumbria
- OS grid reference: NY647324
- Civil parish: Culgaith
- Unitary authority: Westmorland and Furness
- Ceremonial county: Cumbria
- Region: North West
- Country: England
- Sovereign state: United Kingdom
- Post town: PENRITH
- Postcode district: CA10
- Dialling code: 01768
- Police: Cumbria
- Fire: Cumbria
- Ambulance: North West
- UK Parliament: Penrith and Solway

Kirkland is a village in the Westmorland and Furness district of the English county of Cumbria. It is in the historic county of Cumberland. There is a fell called Kirkland Fell.

== See also ==
- Listed buildings in Culgaith
