= Monkhill, Cumbria =

Village in Cumbria, England

Coordinates: 54.918°N 3.025°W

Monkhill
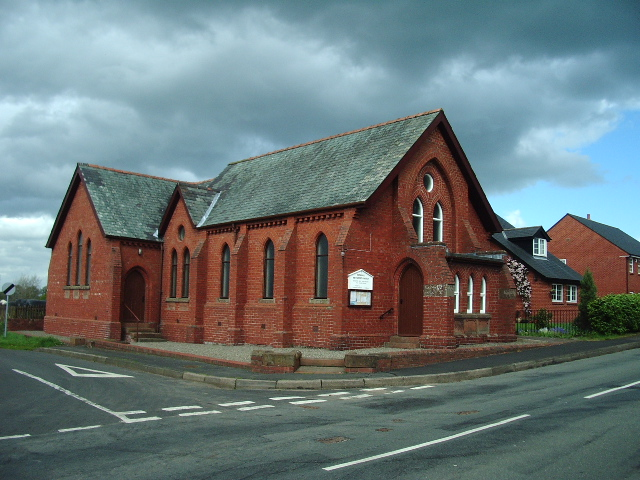
- Monkhill Methodist Church

- Location in the former Carlisle district, Cumbria Location within Cumbria
- OS grid reference: NY342586
- Civil parish: Beaumont
- Unitary authority: Cumberland
- Ceremonial county: Cumbria
- Region: North West
- Country: England
- Sovereign state: United Kingdom
- Post town: CARLISLE
- Postcode district: CA5
- Dialling code: 01228
- Police: Cumbria
- Fire: Cumbria
- Ambulance: North West
- UK Parliament: Carlisle

Monkhill is a small village in the civil parish of Beaumont, in the Cumberland district, in the county of Cumbria, England. Nearby settlements include the small city of Carlisle and the villages of Burgh by Sands and Kirkandrews-on-Eden. Monkhill has a pub called the Drovers Rest Inn and a Methodist Chapel with adjoining School Room which holds local village events. The village is situated on the course of a vallum associated with Hadrian's Wall and is near the narrowest point of the River Eden, the site was a crossing point for Roman troops, Scottish border raiders, and cattle drovers. Monkhill, today, is a quiet little hamlet.

== See also ==
- Listed buildings in Beaumont, Cumbria
