= Listed buildings in Culgaith =

Culgaith is a civil parish in the Westmorland and Furness district of Cumbria, England. It contains 23 buildings that are recorded in the National Heritage List for England. Of these, two are listed at Grade II*, the middle of the three grades, and the others are at Grade II, the lowest grade. The parish contains the villages of Culgaith, Skirwith, and Kirkland and is otherwise rural. The listed buildings consist of houses and associated structures, farmhouses, farm buildings, churches and items in the churchyards, a chapel, a war memorial, and three boundary stones.

== Key ==
Grade	Criteria
II*	Particularly important buildings of more than special interest
II	Buildings of national importance and special interest

== Buildings ==
Name and location	Photograph	Date	Notes	Grade
St Lawrence's Church; 54.68657°N 2.55054°W		13th century	The church was extensively restored in the late 19th century. It is in sandstone with slate roofs, and consists of a nave with an outshut forming a vestry, and a chancel. The nave has quoins and moulded eaves, and the chancel has a chamfered plinth. On the west gable is a gabled bellcote.	II
Churchyard cross 54.68638°N 2.55053°W	—	Medieval (probable)	The cross is in the churchyard of St Lawrence's Church, and has a large plinth block on a stepped base. From this rises the shaft, which is about 8 feet (2.4 m) high, and which has a rectangular plan and chamfered edges. At the top, parts of the three arms remain, and near the centre is a square hole.	II
Millrigg; 54.64790°N 2.60909°W		1597	An L-shaped house that was extended by two bays in the 19th century. It is in sandstone with quoins, and has a slate roof with stone copings. There are two storeys and each range has four bays. On the garden front is a gabled porch and a stair turret; the gable contains a mullioned window and an initialled and dated panel. The doorway has a four-centred arch and a dated lintel. Also on the front are French windows and sashes, one of which is horizontally-sliding. The wing is rendered and has sash windows on the ground floor and casements above. Inside the house is an inglenook and other original features.	II*
Home Farmhouse, washhouse and stables 54.68625°N 2.59789°W	—	Late 17th century (possible)	The oldest part is the stable block, the house was built in the 18th century, and the washhouse was added in 1844. They are in stone with slate roofs. The house is on a chamfered plinth, with quoins, a band, and moulded eaves. It has two storeys, four bays, a doorway in an architrave and with a semicircular pediment, and sash windows in architraves. The washhouse has one storey, a plank door and two sash windows, and the stable has 1 1/2 storeys, quoins, and a small horizontally-sliding sash window.	II
Churchyard walls, gate piers, railings and gate, All Saints' Church; 54.66074°N 2.60599°W	—	18th century	The walls enclose the churchyard and are in sandstone with segmental coping. The gate piers are square and have moulded capitals and pyramidal caps. To the east of the gateway the wall is lower with railings; the railings and gate are in cast iron.	II
Sundial, All Saints' Church; 54.66046°N 2.60572°W	—	Mid-18th century (probable)	The sundial is in the churchyard of All Saints' Church. It has a square plinth on a stepped base, on which is a cylindrical baluster shaft with a moulded capital. On the top is a circular brass plate without a gnomon.	II
Former Post Office; 54.66081°N 2.60671°W	—	18th century	Probably originally two dwellings, it is in stone with quoins and a stone-flag roof. There are two storeys and five bays. Most of the windows are sashes. (Note: Street View in May 2009 shows that the building is no longer in use as a post office.)	II
All Saints' Church; 54.66058°N 2.60556°W		1756	The church was extensively restored in about 1896. It is in sandstone on a chamfered plinth, and has quoins, moulded eaves, and slate roofs with stone copings and an apex cross. The church has a cruciform plan, the transepts being as long as the body of the church. There is a bellcote on the west gable and a gabled west porch.	II
Skirwith Abbey, railings and gate 54.68215°N 2.59881°W	—	Late 18th century	A country house on a moulded plinth, with corner pilasters, some rustication, an eaves cornice, a plain parapet with an open balustrade in the centre, and a hipped slate roof. There are two storeys with a basement, and a symmetrical main front with seven bays. A splayed balustraded stairway leads up to an entrance that has a doorway with an architrave. At the rear is a French window with a pedimented doorcase, and on the sides are two-storey canted bay windows. Around the area are cast iron railings and a gate.	II
Former coach-house and stables, Skirwith Abbey House; 54.68225°N 2.59823°W	—	Late 18th century	The building is in stone with quoins and has a hipped slate roof. There are two storeys and six bays. The building contains a stable door, coach doors, and some blocked entrances. On the south return are rusticated pilasters and a blind Venetian window.	II
Former gardener's quarters, Skirwith Abbey House; 54.68241°N 2.59921°W	—	Late 18th century	The building is in stone with quoins and a hipped slate roof. There are two storeys and six bays. Garage doors have been inserted, and in the upper floor are sash windows. On the south return are rusticated pilasters and a blind Venetian window. At the north end a barn range projects to the rear.	II
Former coach-house, stable, and grooms' quarters, Skirwith Abbey; 54.68236°N 2.59808°W	—	Late 18th to early 19th century	The building is in stone with quoins and a hipped slate roof. It contains a door, sash windows, a coach entrance, and a stable door.	II
Sun Inn; 54.68706°N 2.59734°W		Late 18th to early 19th century	The building is in stone on a plinth, with corner pilasters and a slate roof. It has two storeys and a symmetrical front of three bays. The central doorway has a cornice on brackets, and the windows are sashes.	II
Coach house, Sun Inn; 54.68707°N 2.59708°W	—	Late 18th to early 19th century	The coach house is in stone with a slate roof. It contains a coach entrance with an elliptical head, windows and a door.	II
Methodist Chapel; 54.66086°N 2.60702°W	—	1830	The chapel is in stone on a plinth course, and has stone-flagged eaves and a slate roof with a west apex cross. It has a single storey and a front of three bays. The central doorway has a chamfered surround, and is flanked by one window in each bay. Above the door is an inscribed and dated panel with a moulded frame.	II
Sundial, Millrigg; 54.64785°N 2.60896°W	—	1846	The sundial is in the garden of Millrigg. The pillar and capital have acanthus decoration, and the top is moulded. On the top is a larger main disc, and four smaller discs, two of which have lost their gnomons.	II
Boundary stone 54.70351°N 2.59557°W	—	19th century	The boundary stone is set against the parapet of a bridge. It has angled sides and top, and is inscribed with the names of two townships.	II
Boundary stone 54.68709°N 2.55413°W	—	19th century	The boundary stone is on the north side of the road. It has angled sides and top, and is inscribed with the names of two townships.	II
Boundary stone 54.70329°N 2.62789°W	—	19th century	The boundary stone is set against the parapet of a bridge. It has angled sides and top, and is inscribed with the names of two townships.	II
St John's Church; 54.68667°N 2.59460°W	—	1856	Designed by Frederick John and Horace Francis, the church is in Geometrical Decorated style. It is built in sandstone with green slate roofs and red ridge tiles. The church consists of a nave, a south aisle, a chancel, a north vestry, and a southwest tower embraced by the nave and aisle. The tower has three stages on a chamfered plinth, diagonal buttresses, an embattled parapet with corner gargoyles, and a short octagonal spire with two tiers of lucarnes.	II*
Skirwith Vicarage, coach house and stables 54.68568°N 2.59507°W	—	1856	The vicarage is in sandstone on a chamfered plinth, and has an eaves cornice and a slate roof with coped gables. It is in Gothic style, with two storeys, and has an irregular plan with gabled wings. The doorway has a four-centred arch head, and the windows are casements. A wall links the house to a coach house and stable block, that has one storey and contains a carriage arch, doorways and windows.	II
Barn, Millrigg; 54.64809°N 2.60901°W	—	Mid to late 19th century	The barn is in stone with quoins. It contains paired coach doors with timber lintels, a door, a window, and a loft door approached by steps.	II
War memorial 54.66109°N 2.60481°W		1922	The war memorial stands at a road junction, and is in red sandstone. It consists of a wheel-head cross on a plinth and a two-stepped base. The cross is carved with Celtic-style scrollwork, there is an inscription on the lower part of the shaft, and the names of those lost in the First World War are on the plinth and the base. The memorial is in a hexagonal paved area surrounded by a low kerb and six iron posts and chains.	II

== Notes and references ==
=== Sources ===
- Historic England, "Church of St Lawrence, Culgaith (1144977)", National Heritage List for England
- Historic England, "Cross to south of St Lawrence's Church, Culgaith (1323113)", National Heritage List for England
- Historic England, "Millrigg and dwelling adjoining to north west, Culgaith (1107926)", National Heritage List for England
- Historic England, "Home Farmhouse, house and adjoining stables, Culgaith (1323116)", National Heritage List for England
- Historic England, "Churchyard walls, gate piers, railings and gate to All Saints Church, Culgaith (1144975)", National Heritage List for England
- Historic England, "Sundial to south-west of All Saints Church, Culgaith (1119618)", National Heritage List for England
- Historic England, "Post Office to south-east of Methodist Chapel, Culgaith (1144976)", National Heritage List for England
- Historic England, "Church of All Saints, Culgaith (1323772)", National Heritage List for England
- Historic England, "Skirwith Abbey, House and area railings and gate, Culgaith (1326980)", National Heritage List for England
- Historic England, "Former coach-house and stables to north-east of Skirwith Abbey House, Culgaith (1144979)", National Heritage List for England
- Historic England, "Former gardener's quarters to north-west of Skirwith Abbey house, Culgaith (1323139)", National Heritage List for England
- Historic England, "Former coach-house, stable, and grooms' quarters to north-east of Skirwith Abbey House, Culgaith (1120875)", National Heritage List for England
- Historic England, "Sun Inn, Culgaith (1326979)", National Heritage List for England
- Historic England, "Coach house to rear of Sun Inn, Culgaith (1144978)", National Heritage List for England
- Historic England, "Methodist Chapel, Culgaith (1119590)", National Heritage List for England
- Historic England, "Sundial to south of Millrigg, Culgaith (1326977)", National Heritage List for England
- Historic England, "Boundary stone against south side of south parapet on bridge to south-west of village, Culgaith (1052320)", National Heritage List for England
- Historic England, "Boundary stone on north side of road between Flosh Farm and the Church of All Saints, Culgaith (1323109)", National Heritage List for England
- Historic England, "Boundary stone set against centre of bridge parapet east of Ellercow Farm, Culgaith (1326978)", National Heritage List for England
- Historic England, "Church of St John, Culgaith (1273399)", National Heritage List for England
- Historic England, "Skirwith Vicarage and attached coach house and stables, Culgaith (1115119)", National Heritage List for England
- Historic England, "Barn to north of Millrigg, Culgaith (1144974)", National Heritage List for England
- Historic England, "Culgaith War Memorial, Culgaith (1457728)", National Heritage List for England
- Historic England, Listed Buildings
- Hyde, Matthew; Pevsner, Nikolaus (2010) [1967], Cumbria, The Buildings of England, New Haven and London: Yale University Press, ISBN 978-0-300-12663-1
