= Listed buildings in Kirkoswald, Cumbria =

Kirkoswald is a civil parish in Westmorland and Furness, Cumbria, England. It contains 57 listed buildings that are recorded in the National Heritage List for England. Of these, one is listed at Grade I, the highest of the three grades, seven are at Grade II*, the middle grade, and the others are at Grade II, the lowest grade. The parish contains the village of Kirkoswald, the smaller village of Renwick, and the surrounding countryside. The listed buildings include a castle, now in ruins, two tower houses, one that developed into a country house, and the other into a farmhouse, and buildings formerly associated with a collegiate church. Most of the other listed buildings consist of houses and associated structures, farmhouses and farm buildings. Included in the other listed buildings are churches, a separate bell tower, hotels and public houses, shops, village stocks, a bridge, a former water mill, a bank, a manorial boundary stone, a war memorial, and a telephone kiosk.

== Key ==
Grade	Criteria
I	Buildings of exceptional interest, sometimes considered to be internationally important
II*	Particularly important buildings of more than special interest
II	Buildings of national importance and special interest

== Buildings ==
Name and location	Photograph	Date	Notes	Grade
St Oswald's Church; 54.76106°N 2.69285°W		Early 12th century	The church was enlarged during the following centuries, including the chancel in 1523, and was restored in 1845 and in 1878–79. It is built in large blocks of sandstone and has roofs of Welsh and sandstone slate with coped gables and cross finials. The church consists of a nave, gabled aisles, a chancel, and a timber-framed gabled north porch. Some of the windows are lancets, some have Tudor arched heads, and the west window dates from the 19th century.	II*
Croglin Low Hall; 54.79809°N 2.69449°W	—	15th century (probable)	Originally a tower house, later extended and altered and used as a farmhouse. The oldest part is the tower, the hall was added in the early 16th century, and there were additions and alterations in the 17th and 18th centuries. It is built in sandstone and has roof of a green and Welsh slate. The tower was reduced in height, then raised to 2 1/2 storeys, the hall has two storeys, there is a two-storey three-bay wing at right angles, and a single-bay extension. The entrance to the tower is round-arched and has a chamfered surround. The mullioned windows have been filled and replaced by sashes.	II*
The College; 54.76295°N 2.69369°W	—	Late 15th century	Originally a tower house and vicarage, later part of a collegiate church, and subsequently expanded into a country house. It is in sandstone with quoins and a hipped sandstone slate roof. There are two storeys, the principal front has nine bays, the central five bays being recessed. The doorway has a moulded architrave, a cornice on consoles, and a swan-neck pediment with an inscription and a coat of arms. The windows are sashes with moulded architraves. At the rear is a tower house with 3 1/2 storeys, mullioned windows in the ground floor and sash windows above.	I
Kirkoswald Castle; 54.76217°N 2.68620°W		c. 1485	The castle was abandoned in the late 16th century and is now in ruins. It is built in large blocks of Penrith sandstone on a chamfered plinth. What remains are parts of the vaulted basements of two south towers and a north staircase tower. The staircase tower is three storeys high, it contains a spiral staircase, a pointed ground floor entrance and small lancet openings. The castle remains and the moated site on which they stand are a Scheduled Monument.	II
Byre to north of Croglin Low Hall; 54.79816°N 2.69461°W	—	Early 16th century (probable)	The byre was extended in the 19th century, it is built in large blocks of sandstone, and has a roof of sandstone slate. There are two storeys and four bays, with a one-bay extension to the right. On the front are two filled entrances with chamfered lintels, and three plank doors. Steps cut into the stonework of the wall lead up to a first floor loft doorway, and there are two tiers of ventilation slits.	II*
The College Flat; 54.76278°N 2.69335°W	—	Early 16th century	Originally a building associated with a collegiate church, it was altered in 1699 and in the 19th century, and has been used as a storeroom with a flat above. The building is in sandstone with a green slate roof, and has two storeys and five bays. External steps lead to an upper floor doorway with a chamfered surround, and in a side wall is a Tudor arched entrance with a hood mould and initials. The windows have been altered and vary; they include sash windows in the lower floor, and cross-mullioned windows in the upper floor.	II
Nether Haresceugh; 54.77242°N 2.65892°W	—	1612	The farmhouse is in sandstone with sandstone slate roofs, and was extended at right angles in 1702, forming a T-shaped plan. The older part has two storeys and five bays. The entrance has a chamfered surround, and there is a variety of windows; some are mullioned, some are sashes, and some are casements. The extension is on a chamfered plinth, and has a shaped cornice and coped gables. There are 2 1/2 storeys and five bays. The doorway has a moulded architrave, a frieze containing an oval date panel, a moulded entablature, and a moulded cornice, and there is a filled cross-mullion window.	II*
Huddlesceugh Hall and barn 54.77376°N 2.62684°W	—	Early or mid 16th century	The farmhouse was altered and extended in 1617 and in the later 18th century. It is rendered with a slate roof, two storeys, numerous bays, and a lower projecting extension to the right. The doorway has a Tudor arched head. and in the extension is a dated lintel stone with carved decorations. The windows have mullions, they contain casements, and have a continuous hood mould. The barn is in sandstone, and contains three round arches with impost blocks and keystones, and four square openings.	II
Demesne Farmhouse; 54.76237°N 2.69142°W		1622	The farmhouse was extended at right angles in the 17th century. The original part is in large sandstone blocks, and has three storeys and three bays. The central blocked doorway has a moulded architrave with an inscription above it, there is a blocked fire window, and the other windows are sashes, those in the middle floor being horizontally-sliding. The extension is stuccoed on a stone plinth with quoins and a green slate roof. There are two storeys with cellars and a symmetrical front of five bays. Flanking steps lead up to the central doorway that has a moulded architrave, a cornice and a broken segmental pediment. The windows are cross-mullioned in moulded architraves.	II*
Gatehouse, Croglin Low Hall; 54.79815°N 2.69425°W	—	Early 17th century	The former gatehouse, later used as an outbuilding, is in sandstone and has a stone-slate roof, two storeys, and one bay. The openings include an enlarged entrance with re-used chamfered jambs and a wooden lintel, a small staircase window, a filled mullioned window, and a sash window.	II
Sickergill and barn 54.77717°N 2.63725°W	—	Mid 17th century	The farmhouse was extended to the left in the late 18th century. The buildings are in sandstone with green slate roofs. The house has quoins and two storeys, the original part has three bays, and the extension has two. The original part has two mullioned windows and a fire window, and in both parts are sash windows. The barn to the right dates from the 18th century and has two storeys and two bays. It contains a large cart entrance, small square openings, and ventilation slits.	II
Scales Fold and byre 54.78155°N 2.67025°W	—	Late 17th century	The farmhouse, which was altered and extended in 1729, and the byre are in sandstone. The house has projecting footing stones, quoins, and a roof of green slate with some sandstone slate. There are two storeys, three bays, a doorway with a moulded architrave and a dated and initialled frieze, and sash windows. The byre to the right has a Welsh slate roof, a partly filled round-headed cart entrance, plank doors, and loft doors with external steps leading to one of them.	II
Ona Ash; 54.77213°N 2.68504°W		1693	The house and attached outbuildings are in sandstone with thatched roofs. The house was probably originally in a single storey and was raised to two storeys in the 18th century. The doorway, above which is a dated lintel, and the ground floor windows, which are horizontally-sliding sashes and a fire window, have chamfered surrounds, and in the upper floor are casement windows with plain surrounds. To the left is a single-storey outbuilding. Inside the house is an inglenook and a bressumer, and in the roof is a pair of upper crucks.	II*
Gate piers, St Oswald's Church; 54.76231°N 2.69328°W	—	Late 17th century (probable)	The gate piers were originally at the entrance to The College, and were moved to their present position by the entrance to the churchyard in about 1848. They are in red sandstone and consist of square columns with moulded panels and scrolled brackets. Each pier has a moulded cornice and a shaped cap.	II
Wall and steps, The College; 54.76297°N 2.69399°W	—	Late 17th century (probable)	The retaining wall for the terrace, including a flight of steps, is to the west of The College. They are in sandstone, the wall has moulded coping, and the steps are flanked by closed balusters. There are two square piers, on one of which is a brass sundial with a Latin inscription.	II
Westgarth Hill and barn 54.77686°N 2.69928°W	—	Late 17th century	The farmhouse and barn are in sandstone and have roofs of sandstone slate. The house has a moulded cornice, coped gables, two storeys and three bays. The doorway has a moulded architrave, a plain frieze and a moulded cornice. The windows are sashes, and one is a horizontally-sliding sash. The barn is at right angles to the left. It has an entrance with a chamfered surround and a lintel, another entrance with a quoined surround, and casement windows.	II
Manor House; 54.76354°N 2.69200°W		1703	A sandstone house with quoins, a cornice, and a sandstone slate roof. There are two storeys and five bays. The doorway has a moulded architrave, a dated frieze, and a cornice. The windows are sashes in moulded architraves, and some are blocked and painted as false windows.	II
Anne Dale and Bridge Stores; 54.76338°N 2.69196°W	—	1712	A house and a shop, both with two storeys and two bays. The house is older, it is stuccoed with a sandstone slate roof, and doors and sash windows with plain stone surrounds. The shop to the right dates from the early 19th century and projects forward. It is in sandstone with quoins, a Welsh slate roof, a doorway with a chamfered surround, a bow window in the ground floor, and casement windows above.	II
Barns, Fieldgarth; 54.77103°N 2.71364°W	—	1722	Originally a farmhouse, later converted into a barn, and extended in the early 19th century, the barns are in sandstone with a corrugated asbestos roof. The original part has two storeys and four bays, and it contains a doorway with a re-used chamfered lintel, unglazed mullioned windows, and a fire window. The extension to the left has two bays, two doorways with quoined surrounds, and a loft doorway with a re-used dated and inscribed lintel.	II
High College; 54.76423°N 2.69310°W	—	Early 18th century	A sandstone house with a sandstone slate roof, two storeys and four bays. The doorway has a chamfered stone surround. The windows in the ground floor are double sashes with chamfered mullions, and in the upper floor they are sashes with hollow-chamfered surrounds.	II
Post Office; 54.76395°N 2.69325°W		Early 18th century	A stuccoed house on a chamfered plinth, with pilastered quoins and a sandstone slate roof. There are two storeys and five bays. The doorway has a pilastered surround, and the windows are sashes with stone surrounds.	II
Scarrowmanwick and barn 54.81680°N 2.65377°W	—	Early 18th century	The farmhouse and barn to the right are in sandstone with green slate roofs. The house has two storeys and six bays. The doorway has a moulded architrave, a pulvinated frieze, and a segmental pediment. The windows are sashes in chamfered stone surrounds.	II
Village stocks 54.76383°N 2.69312°W	—	Early 18th century (probable)	The stocks consists of a long narrow slab of Penrith sandstone set into the cobbles of The Square, hollowed at the top to take two pairs of legs. In the centre is an iron hook set in lead.	II
Bell tower 54.76174°N 2.69237°W		1743	The bell tower stands on a small hill to the northeast of St Oswald's Church, and its upper part was rebuilt in 1893. It is in sandstone, and consists of a square two-stage tower with an angle stair turret. The doorway has a moulded surround, the bell openings are mullioned and have louvred vents, the parapet is battlemented, and on the top is a weathervane. The tower stands on a platform, with steps leading to the doorway, and with ball finials on the corners.	II*
Archway and wall, Croglin Old Hall; 54.79828°N 2.69422°W	—	Mid 18th century (probable)	This was the original entrance to the farmyard. It is in sandstone, and consists of a high wall containing a round chamfered arch with chamfered jambs and moulded impost blocks.	II
Black Bull and adjoining house 54.76390°N 2.69275°W		Mid 18th century	The public house and adjoining house are stuccoed and have a roof of Welsh slate with some sandstone slate. They have two storeys, the public house has three bays, and the house has two. The doorways and sash windows have plain stone surrounds.	II
Busk Rigg and barns 54.77241°N 2.60842°W	—	18th century	The farmhouse and barns are in sandstone, with roofs partly of green slate and partly of sandstone slate. The house has two storeys, three bays, a doorway with a stone surround, and mullioned windows containing casements. Both barns have round-arched cart entrances and loft doors, one of which is reached by external stone steps.	II
Churchyard wall 54.76089°N 2.69307°W	—	18th century	The wall surrounds the churchyard of St Oswald's Church. It is a low wall in red sandstone with rounded coping. At intervals are stones inscribed with the initials of the parishioners who built it.	II
Eden Bank and outbuilding 54.76446°N 2.69340°W	—	Mid 18th century	The house and outbuilding are in sandstone with quoins and a Welsh slate roof. They have two storeys, the house has three bays, and the outbuilding has two. The windows are sashes. The doorways have a plain stone surrounds, and the doorway of the house also has a moulded cornice. In the outbuilding are double garage doors and ventilation slits.	II
Former Congregational Church; 54.77196°N 2.64190°W	—	18th century (probable)	Originally a church, later converted into a house, it is in sandstone with quoins and a Welsh slate roof. It has one storey, four bays. a round-arched doorway and four round-arched lancet windows.	II
Park View; 54.77863°N 2.71255°W	—	18th century	A rendered farmhouse on a sandstone plinth with quoins and a slate roof. It has two storeys, three bays, a doorway with an alternate block surround and a keyed entablature, and sash windows with plain stone surrounds.	II
1, 3 and 4 The Square; 54.76369°N 2.69315°W	—	1757	A row of houses, originally 5, now 3, they are rendered with sandstone slate roofs, and have two storeys. No. 1 is the oldest, it has quoins and two bays, No. 3 has four bays, and No. 4 has two. The doors and sash windows have plain stone surrounds.	II
Eden Bridge; 54.75639°N 2.69971°W		1762	The bridge carries the B6413 road over the River Eden. It is in red sandstone, with quoins in calciferous sandstone. The bridge has four round arches, the midstream arch being the largest. There are three splayed piers that rise to form rectangular pedestrian refuges. The bridge has voussoirs, a solid parapet, two smaller dry arches on the Kirkoswald side, and a benchmark on the north parapet. The bridge is also a Scheduled Monument.	II
Barn, Low Huddlesceugh; 54.77303°N 2.63364°W	—	1765	The barn is in sandstone with quoins, a green slate roof, and is in a single storey with two bays. It has a plank door in a plain surround, and a cart entrance with a flat arch.	II
Crown Hotel; 54.76369°N 2.69284°W		Late 18th century	The hotel is stuccoed with quoins and a green slate roof. There are three storeys and two bays. The door has a V-shaped joint surround, and the windows are double-sashes in stone surrounds.	II
Fog Close; 54.76397°N 2.67896°W	—	Late 18th century	A sandstone farmhouse with quoins, a slate roof, two storeys, and three bays. The doorway and the sash windows have plain raised stone surrounds.	II
George House; 54.76371°N 2.69232°W		Late 18th century	Originally a hotel, later a private house, it is stuccoed and has two storeys. The main part has three bays, and to the left is a two-bay projection. The main part has a slate roof, and the roof of the projection is in sandstone slate; the projection also has quoins. Above the doorway is a semicircular pediment, the windows are sashes, and all have plain stone surrounds.	II
Hill House; 54.76446°N 2.69376°W	—	Late 18th century (probable)	A stuccoed house on a plinth with quoins and a green slate roof. It has two storeys, three bays, a door in a moulded architrave, and sash windows in stucco surrounds.	II
Hollybank View; 54.78488°N 2.62795°W	—	Late 18th century	A stuccoed house with quoins, a slate roof, two storeys, and two bays. The doorway has an alternate block surround and a keyed entablature, and the sash windows have raised plain stone surrounds.	II
Outhwaite and outbuildings 54.78528°N 2.61126°W	—	Late 18th century	The farmhouse and outbuildings are in sandstone with green slate roofs. The farmhouse has a plinth, quoins, coped gables, two storeys and three bays. The doorway has an alternate block surround and a keyed entablature, and the windows are sashes in moulded architraves. To the right is a barn with an L-shaped plan that has numerous bays, and contains cart entrances, external steps leading to loft doors, sash windows and a casement window. To the left of the house is an outbuilding in two storeys and three bays, that has three round open arches in the ground floor, sash windows above, and a single-storey outshut at the rear.	II
Barn, Sickergill; 54.77716°N 2.63777°W	—	Late 18th century	The barn is in sandstone with a slate roof, two storeys, an L-shaped plan, and numerous bays. It has cart entrances and other entrances, all with round arches, ventilation slits, and external steps leading to a loft door.	II
The College and un-named house 54.78495°N 2.62804°W	—	Late 18th century	A pair of similar rendered houses with a green slate roof. two storeys, and two bays each. The doorways have round-arched fanlights and raised stone surrounds with imposts and false keystones, and the windows are sashes with raised stone surrounds.	II
Low Huddlesceugh; 54.77321°N 2.63362°W	—	1784	A sandstone farmhouse with quoins, a Welsh slate roof, two storeys, and three bays. The doorway has a quoined surround and on the lintel is a dated and initialled oval. The windows are sashes in stone surrounds.	II
Blunderfield Farmhouse and barn 54.78212°N 2.67883°W	—	1807	The farmhouse and barn are in sandstone. The house incorporates earlier material, it has a Welsh slate roof, quoins, two storeys, and three bays. The doorway has a quoined surround and a dated lintel, and the windows are sashes. The farmhouse is joined by an extension to a barn at right angles that incorporates an earlier house and has a roof of sandstone slate. It contains a large cart entrance, a smaller entrance, and ventilation slits.	II
Fieldgarth; 54.77093°N 2.71333°W	—	1816	A rendered farmhouse on a stone plinth with quoins and a slate roof. There are two storeys and three bays. The doorway has a quoined surround and a keyed and dated entablature. The windows are sashes with raised plain stone surrounds.	II
Stable block, The College; 54.76253°N 2.69363°W	—	Early 19th century	The stable block is in sandstone with roofs of Welsh slate and sandstone slate, and with crow-stepped gables. The block has two storeys and numerous bays, and it encloses the stable yard on three sides. The central block contains a large arched entrance, and in the other ranges are garage doors, plank loft doors, and ventilation slits.	II
Mill House; 54.76357°N 2.69271°W	—	Early 19th century	The house is in sandstone with a sandstone slate roof. It has two storeys and an L-shaped plan, with two bays in each range. The door and sash windows have plain stone surrounds.	II
Old Mill; 54.76350°N 2.69259°W	—	Early 19th century	The former water corn mill has been converted into flats. It is in sandstone and has a hipped Welsh slate roof. There are 2 1/2 storeys at the front, three at the rear, and five bays. On the front is a large round-arched cart entrance, a smaller doorway, casement windows, and two gabled dormers, and on the left is an overshot water wheel.	II
The Mains and outbuilding 54.75249°N 2.68288°W	—	Early 19th century	The farmhouse and outbuilding are in sandstone with sandstone slate roofs. The house has quoins, two storeys, three bays, and a rear extension giving an L-shaped plan. There are two entrances; the right entrance has a sandstone gabled porch, and the left entrance has a stone surround, a cornice, and re-used quatrefoil panels. The windows have chamfered mullions and contain sashes, and in the extension is a round-headed stair window. The outbuilding to the left has two levels of ventilation slits, and a single-bay extension at right angles.	II
Wordsley House; 54.76376°N 2.69254°W	—	Early 19th century	A sandstone house, later divided into flats, on a chamfered plinth, with quoins, two storeys and three bays. Flanking steps lead to a doorway that has a moulded architrave, a pulvinated frieze, and a moulded cornice, and the windows are sashes in stone surrounds.	II
Featherstone Arms Hotel; 54.76400°N 2.69288°W		1826	The hotel is in calciferous sandstone with quoins and a hipped slate roof. It has two storeys, the original part has three bays, and a single-bay shop to the right has been incorporated. The round-headed doorway has a pilastered surround and a painted-over fanlight, and the windows are sashes in stone surrounds. To the left is an arched carriage entrance with an oval datestone. The former shop has a shop window and a doorway in the ground floor and a sash window above.	II
Entrance gateway, The College; 54.76254°N 2.69324°W		1848	The gateway is in sandstone, and consists of a pointed carriage arch with a smaller similar pedestrian arch to the left, and a stepped parapet. To the left of the gateway is a battlemented wall resembling a tower, and to the right is an octagonal column with a square plinth and a square cap.	II
Methodist Church; 54.78532°N 2.62840°W	—	Late 19th century	The church is in sandstone on a chamfered plinth with a Welsh slate roof. It has a modillioned cornice, a central flèche, and a projecting porch with a battlemented parapet. The windows have chamfered surrounds, and between them are buttresses. There is an early 20th-century extension with a three-light cross-mullioned window.	II
Midland Bank; 54.76366°N 2.69221°W		Late 19th century	The bank is in sandstone on a chamfered plinth, with quoins, a moulded sub-cornice, a hipped slate roof with projecting eaves and shaped eaves modillions. There are three storeys, one bay on the front and two on the side. There are two doorways with pilaster strip surrounds and a bank window between them. The other windows are sashes in plastered surrounds, with segmental heads, false keystones, and hood moulds.	II
Manorial boundary stone 54.78114°N 2.62011°W		1913	The stone marks the western boundary of the Manor of Haresceugh. It is in sandstone with a rounded top, and carries an incised inscription.	II
War Memorial; 54.76385°N 2.69309°W		1920	The war memorial stands in an enclosure in The Square. It is in red sandstone, and is in the form of a medieval market cross. The cross has a chamfered shaft standing on a plinth on three square steps, and is surrounded by iron railings and a gate. On the east face of the steps is an inscription, and on the plinth are bronze plaques with the names of those lost in the two World Wars.	II
Telephone kiosk 54.76378°N 2.69346°W	—	1935	A K6 type telephone kiosk, designed by Giles Gilbert Scott. Constructed in cast iron with a square plan and a dome, it has three unperforated crowns in the top panels.	II
