= Skirwith =

Village in Cumbria, England

Coordinates: 54.687°N 2.597°W

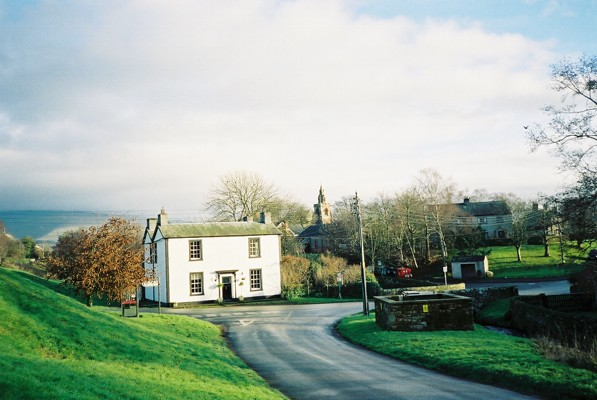
- Skirwith

- Location in Eden, Cumbria Location within Cumbria
- OS grid reference: NY615325
- Civil parish: Culgaith
- Unitary authority: Westmorland and Furness
- Ceremonial county: Cumbria
- Region: North West
- Country: England
- Sovereign state: United Kingdom
- Post town: PENRITH
- Postcode district: CA10
- Dialling code: 01768
- Police: Cumbria
- Fire: Cumbria
- Ambulance: North West
- UK Parliament: Penrith and Solway

Skirwith is a village and former civil parish, now in the parish of Culgaith, in the Westmorland and Furness district, in the county of Cumbria, England. In 1931 the parish had a population of 227. On 1 April 1934 the parish was abolished and merged with Culgaith.

Skirwith is seven miles from Penrith in a generally north-easterly direction, on a minor road about a mile from Blencarn. Just to the south are remains of a priory, now incorporated in farm buildings.

Notable residents of Skirwith include the Franciscan missionary John Bradburne.

== See also ==
- Listed buildings in Culgaith
