= Culgaith =

Village and civil parish in Cumbria, England

Coordinates: 54.661°N 2.605°W

- Village and parish
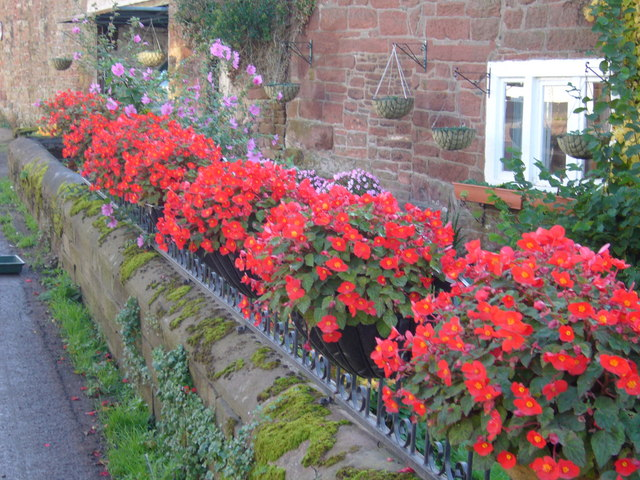
- An old Cumbrian farmhouse in Culgaith

- Location within Cumbria Location within Cumbria
- Population: 826 (2011)
- OS grid reference: NY6129
- Civil parish: Culgaith
- Unitary authority: Westmorland and Furness
- Ceremonial county: Cumbria
- Region: North West
- Country: England
- Sovereign state: United Kingdom
- Post town: PENRITH
- Postcode district: CA10
- Dialling code: 01768
- Police: Cumbria
- Fire: Cumbria
- Ambulance: North West
- UK Parliament: Penrith and Solway

Culgaith is a village and civil parish in the Westmorland and Furness district of Cumbria, north-west England. The village is on a ridge above the River Eden, between Temple Sowerby and Langwathby. At the 2001 census the parish had a population of 721, increasing to 826 at the 2011 United Kingdom census.

Amenities include All Saints’ Church, and its associated primary school, as well as a public house. The village railway station closed in 1970.

== Toponymy ==
The name Culgaith is first attested in the twelfth century, as Culgait. "This name is of most likely Brythonic origin. It is formed from an Old Celtic base *cūl, which has developed into Welsh 'cil', 'corner, retreat,' and British *koid, Welsh coed, 'wood'. The Old English form of the name would have been Cȳlcēt." The first element might also be *cǖl, 'narrow', which would give Culgaith the same toponymy as Culcheth.

Culgaith is less likely to be derived from Gaelic *cid gaoit or *cil gaoit, meaning 'at the back of the wind' and 'windy nook', respectively.

== Geography ==
The B6412 road links Culgaith to the A66 road to the south and the village of Langwathby to the north west. The town of Penrith is 6 miles (9.7 km) to the west.

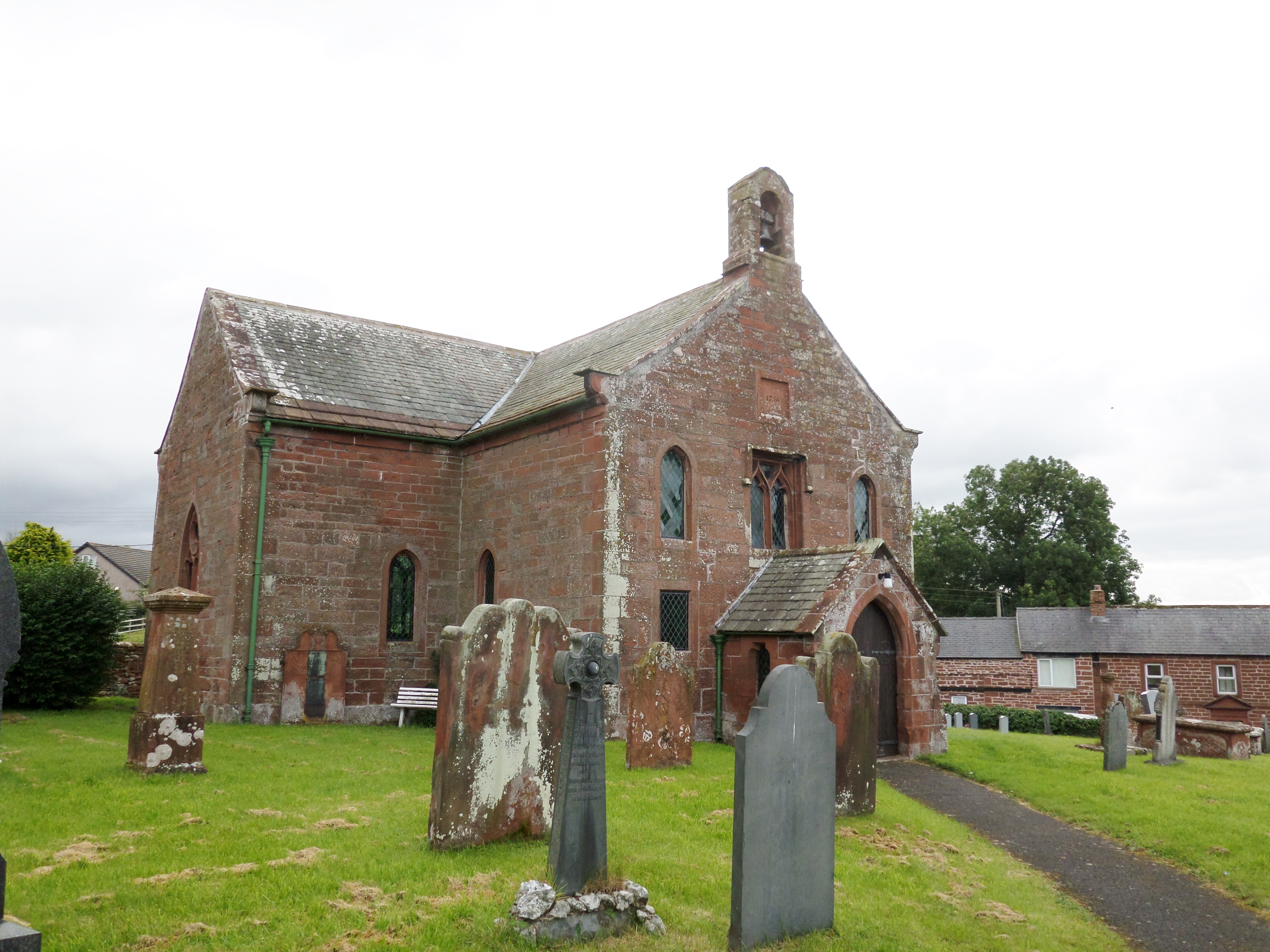
All Saints Church, Culgaith. (2017)

== History ==
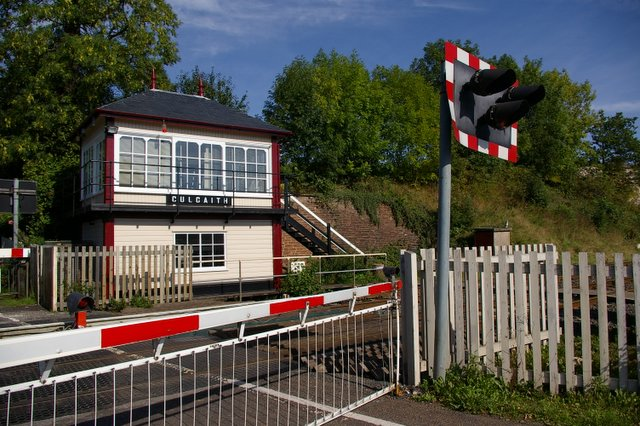
Culgaith level crossing and signal box. (2006)

The village probably took its name from Henry de Culgaith, Clerk, who received a grant of lands in Carlisle, the local see, in vico Francorum. In circa 1296, his widow Alice de Culgaith quitclaimed the dower held of Holm Abbey which included her late husband's fee farm for rents.

There was originally a chapel of Latin Christendom, attached to a mother church at Kirkland. However, at the time, the Lord of the Manor in Moieties of Land was Sir Michael de Hercla, later Earl of Carlisle. He fought alongside King Edward I in the Scottish wars of independence, and was present at the siege of Caerlaverock Castle in 1300. The Earl fell foul of the King, and was attained and sent to the dungeon at Carlisle. The Manor was alienated to Sir Hugh Monceby, a brave knight.

Lady Knyvett inherited the estates of the Morricebys and Pickerings at Culgaith. Sir Michael's son and heir Andrew de Hercla further angered the new King Edward II, who ordered his execution at Carlisle in 1327, supposedly the year of his own demise. Nonetheless, the wood, Kirklandres, at Culgaith Manor, was conveyed to the monks at York. During the Wars of the Roses, the Manor was transferred to the Priory of Carlisle, with the church and chapel of ease.

A grammar school was founded at the heart of the village opposite the parish church, for the parishes of Culgaith and Blencarn. Land at Culgaith was used to found the Barton Grammar School. Before his death in 1443 he conveyed the manor to Hugh Salkeld. By the census of 1811, the population of the area was grouped within the parish with the townships of Kirkland, Blencarn, and Skirwith.

There were 141 houses and 608 inhabitants in the chapelry, under the superior township of Skirwith. The population did not grow significantly until the 1960s. During the previous hundred years, Culgaith increased by only four people. During the industrial revolution the parish was distinctly agricultural, of which 3,052 acres were arable, 4625 were grazing pasture, and unbelievably, only 16 acres were woods in the whole of Kirk to Linton.

=== Railway ===
Culgaith railway station opened in 1880 and permanently closed in May 1970.

== Notable people ==
- Canadian politician Matthew Kendal Richardson was born in Culgaith.
- Stuart Lancaster, a former head coach for the England Rugby Football Union, was born in Culgaith.

== See also ==
- Listed buildings in Culgaith
