= Kirkoswald, Cumbria =

Village and civil parish in Cumbria, England

Coordinates: 54.765183°N 2.693673°W

Kirkoswald
- Village and parish
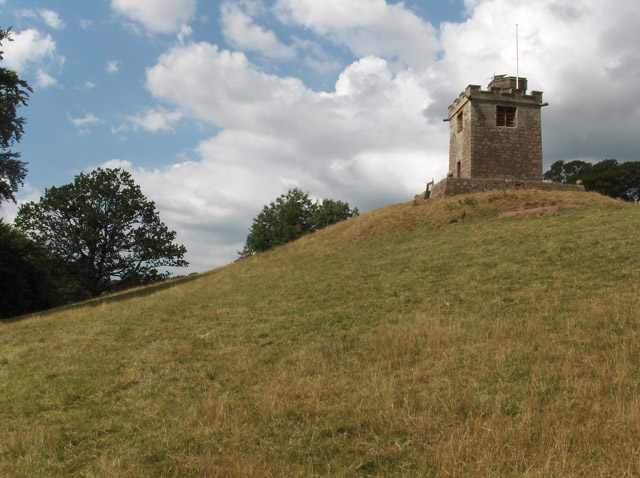
- The belltower, built on the hill above the church so that villagers could hear the bells

- Location in the former Eden District Location within Cumbria
- Population: 901 (2011)
- OS grid reference: NY5541
- Civil parish: Kirkoswald
- Unitary authority: Westmorland and Furness
- Ceremonial county: Cumbria
- Region: North West
- Country: England
- Sovereign state: United Kingdom
- Post town: PENRITH
- Postcode district: CA10
- Dialling code: 01768
- Police: Cumbria
- Fire: Cumbria
- Ambulance: North West
- UK Parliament: Penrith and Solway

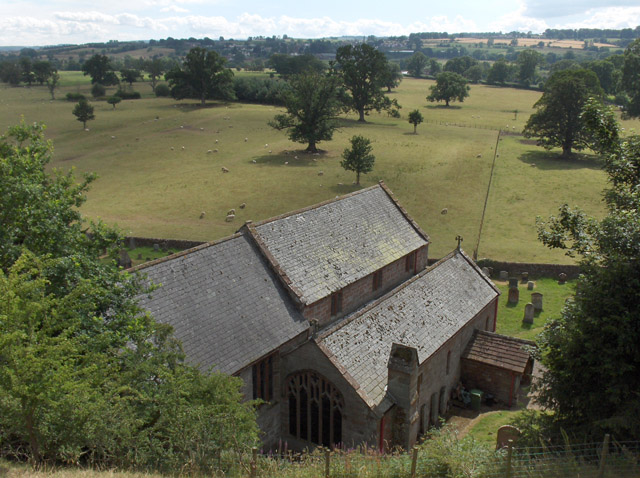
St Oswald's Church, Kirkoswald, looking south-west

Kirkoswald is a village, civil parish, and former market town located in Westmorland and Furness, England, about 9 miles (14 km) from Penrith. The village is in the historic county of Cumberland. The village, referred to colloquially as KO, had a population of 870 at the 2001 census, which rose to 901 at the 2011 Census.

== Heritage ==
The village name means "Church of St Oswald", the parish church being dedicated to Saint Oswald, King of Northumbria. The body of Oswald is believed to have been taken through the village. The church lies on the southern edge of the village overlooking the River Eden, close to the bridge connecting Kirkoswald to Lazonby. St Oswald's Church is unique in having a 19th-century bell tower on top of a hill 200 yards from the church itself. Parts of the church date from the 12th century, the chancel being added in 1523, when the "College" was founded by Thomas Dacre, 2nd Baron Dacre and his wife. A sacred spring lies under the nave of the church, and a well is found on the west wall.

In 1808 a hoard of perhaps 543 Northumbrian copper alloy stycas and a silver trefoil ornament was found amongst an uprooted tree in the parish.

One of Kirkoswald's most splendid buildings is the college, its name recalling the days when St Oswald's Church was a collegiate church. Originally built in 1450 as a Pele Tower it became, after dissolution in 1547, home to the Fetherstonhaugh family, which previously lived at Featherstone Castle, Northumberland.

The population in the 1841 census was 691 inhabitants.

== Amenities ==
The village has one main street rising up a steep hill passing through a former market place with its two pubs – the Crown Inn and the Fetherston Arms. A third pub, the Black Bull, which at one time won awards for its food, overlooked the square, but this closed in the early 1990s. It also has a shop that houses a post office, a Methodist church and a well-attended primary school. Until recently there were further shops, including a butcher and a branch of the Midland Bank.

Given its market charter in the 13th century, the village held a market before it was moved to Lazonby and Kirkoswald railway station after the opening of the Settle to Carlisle Railway Line in 1876.

== Governance ==
Kirkoswald is in Westmorland and Furness. Before 2023 it was in the Eden district of Cumbria. Included in the parish are the nearby village of Renwick and the hamlets of Staffield, High Bankhill, Parkhead and Scales. From 1866 to 1934 Staffield was a separate civil parish. Renwick was also a separate parish until 1934. The parish council meets at the village hall in Kirkoswald's former market square.

A former electoral ward in the same name stretched north to Ainstable, with a total population at the 2011 census of 1,471.

== Notable people ==
- Bridget Atkinson (1732–1814), farmer and shell collector who amassed a collection from around the world. First honorary member of the Society of Antiquaries of Newcastle upon Tyne.
- Timothy Brown (1743/1744–1820), radical, banker, and merchant, was born in Kirkoswald
- Maria Fetherstonhaugh (1847–1918), a novelist who also used the name Minna Carleton, was married at Kirkoswald in 1865 to Timothy Fetherstonhaugh, once a captain of the 13th Hussars.

== See also ==
- Listed buildings in Kirkoswald, Cumbria
- Kirkoswald Hoard
