= Ousby =

Village in Cumbria, England

Coordinates: 54.705°N 2.582°W

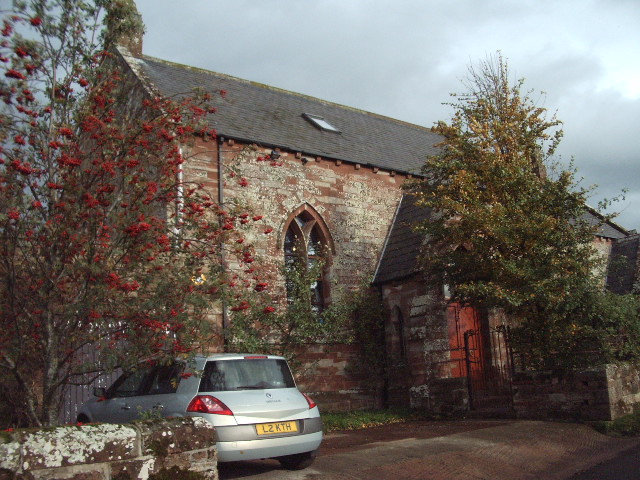
- Converted Chapel at Row

- Location in former Eden District, Cumbria Location within Cumbria
- Population: 447 (2011)
- OS grid reference: NY6234
- Civil parish: Ousby
- Unitary authority: Westmorland and Furness
- Ceremonial county: Cumbria
- Region: North West
- Country: England
- Sovereign state: United Kingdom
- Post town: PENRITH
- Postcode district: CA10
- Dialling code: 01768
- Police: Cumbria
- Fire: Cumbria
- Ambulance: North West
- UK Parliament: Penrith and Solway

Ousby is a village and civil parish in the Westmorland and Furness district, in the English county of Cumbria. It is a Doubly Thankful Village, one of 14 parishes in England and Wales that suffered no casualties during World War I and World War II. The village is featured on Darren Hayman's album, Thankful Villages Volume 3. The parish had a population of 362 in 2001, which had increased to 447 at the 2011 Census, and includes the hamlets of Crewgarth, Row, Shire and Townhead. Melmerby parish was absorbed on 1 April 1934, on 1 April 2019 Melmerby became a separate parish again.

== Location ==
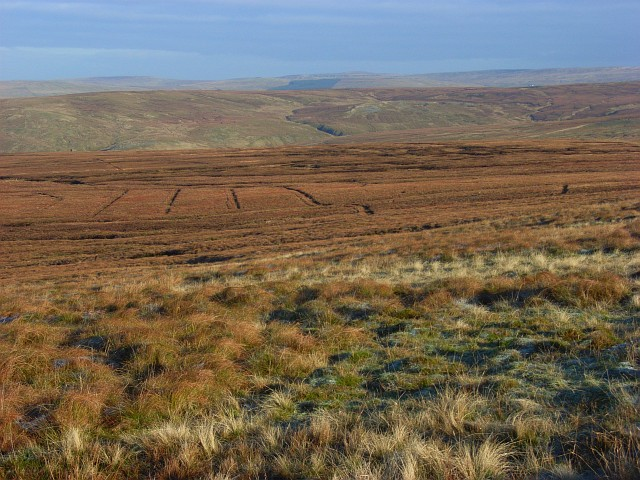
Ousby Fell

Ousby is located in Ousbydale about 1 mile (1.6 km) south of the village of Melmerby, near the A686 road. There is a fell in the Pennines named Ousby Fell.

== See also ==
- Listed buildings in Ousby
