= Listed buildings in Ousby =

Ousby is a civil parish in Westmorland and Furness, Cumbria, England. It contains 15 listed buildings that are recorded in the National Heritage List for England. All the listed buildings are designated at Grade II, the lowest of the three grades, which is applied to "buildings of national importance and special interest". The parish includes the village of Ousby, the surrounding countryside, and hills and fells to the east. Note that Melmerby became a separate parish in April 2019 but this list still includes it. The listed buildings consist of two churches, two medieval cross bases, houses, farmhouses and farm buildings, a former post office, an inn, and a former shepherd's hut, later used as a walkers' hut.

== Buildings ==
Name and location	Photograph	Date	Notes
St John the Baptist's Church; 54.73045°N 2.60551°W		13th century	The church was extensively restored in 1848, when the tower was also added, and in 1895. It is in stone on a plinth, with a string course, an eaves cornice, stepped buttresses, and a slate roof with coped gables and apex crosses. The church consists of a nave and a chancel in a single cell, a south porch, and a northwest tower. The tower has three stages and a higher stair turret.
Cross base, St John's Church; 54.73041°N 2.60532°W	—	Medieval	The cross base is in the churchyard of St John the Baptist's Church. It has a round plan, and contains the stump of a rectangular shaft in the socket.
Cross base, St Luke's Church; 54.70252°N 2.57298°W	—	Medieval {possible}	The cross base is in the churchyard of St Luke's Church. It consists of a cubic sandstone block, and it contains a shaft of 3 feet (0.91 m) in the socket.
Blackburn Shop (Ancient Sheiling); 54.73401°N 2.47126°W	—	Late medieval	Originally a shepherd's hut, it was later altered and used as a walkers' hut. The building formerly had two rooms, now one room has no roof, and the other room has been divided into two unequal compartments. It is constructed of drystone walls and has corrugated metal roofing. The roofed section has a doorway and a 20th-century window.
St Luke's Church; 54.70259°N 2.57295°W		Late 16th century	The medieval church was rebuilt incorporating earlier material, and a further rebuilding took place in 1858. The church is in stone, partly on a medieval plinth and with medieval quoins. It has buttresses, and a slate roof with some stone-flagging. The church consists of a nave, a chancel and a south porch added in 1896. There is a pedimented bellcote on the west gable, and an apex cross on the east gable.
Former north-east wing of Rayson Hall; 54.70145°N 2.57224°W	—	1606	This was the original house, possibly incorporating earlier material. A stair wing was added at the rear in the 17th century, and the house was extensively reconstructed in the 20th century. It is in stone with quoins, and has a slate roof with coping at the north end. There are two storeys and a doorway with a moulded surround. At the rear are mullioned windows; at the front the mullions have been removed, Above the doorway and the windows on the front are hood moulds with decorated labels, and there is a blocked fire window with a carved and dated lintel.
Melmerby Hall; 54.72967°N 2.60489°W		1658	The oldest part of the house is the rear wing, the main part being added in the 18th century, and a large semicircular bay window was added in the 20th century. The house is in stone with rusticated end pilasters, bands, moulded eaves, and a slate roof with copings. The house has an L-shaped plan, two storeys with an attic, and a symmetrical five-bay front. In the rear wing are mullioned windows, in the main block the windows are sashes, with casements in the attic.
Byre, Rayson Hall; 54.70143°N 2.57198°W	—	Late 17th century (probable)	The byre forms the west range of the courtyard. It is in stone with quoins and has a stone-flagged roof. There are two storeys, two original doorways, one of which has been blocked, a loft door approached by external steps, and later doors and windows.
Threshing barn and byres, Rayson Hall; 54.70157°N 2.57175°W	—	1691	The farm building forms the east range of a courtyard. It is in stone with quoins, and has a corrugated asbestos roof. On the front facing the road is a blocked elliptical-headed wagon door above which are carved shields with initials and the date. On the courtyard front is a segmental-headed wagon door.
Hole Farmhouse; 54.70408°N 2.59472°W	—	1743	A stone farmhouse on a chamfered plinth, with bands, rusticated quoins, moulded eaves, and a slate roof with stone coping. There are two storeys, a symmetrical five-bay front, a former single-story wash house to the left, a former two-storey coach house on the right, and an outshut at the rear. The central doorway has a moulded surround and a segmental pediment containing the date and an inscription. There is one mullioned window in the outshut, and the other windows are sashes.
Bradley Foot Farmhouse and barn range 54.70617°N 2.59143°W	—	Mid 18th century	The farmhouse and the later higher barn to the left are in stone with quoins and slate roofs. The house has two storeys, a symmetrical front of three bays, and mullioned windows; the door and windows have stone surrounds. The barn has four byre doors, a coach door, and a loft door approached by steps, all with segmental heads, impost blocks and projecting keystones.
Former front range of Rayson Hall; 54.70138°N 2.57233°W	—	18th century	This was built as a wing at right angles to the original hall, and is now a separate dwelling. It is stuccoed on a plinth, with rusticated quoins and a hipped slate roof. There are two storeys, four bays, and sash windows with stone surrounds.
Threshing barn and gin-gang, Rayson Hall; 54.70140°N 2.57166°W	—	18th century (probable)	The barn and gin gang form the south range of the courtyard. They are in stone, the barn has quoins and a slate roof with stone-flagged eaves, and the polygonal gin gang at the rear has a corrugated asbestos roof. In the barn is a wagon door with a chamfered surround and a segmental head, a smaller door, and two inserted windows.
Post Office and store 54.72989°N 2.59876°W		Late 18th century	Originally a house and cottage, later used for other purposes, it is in stone on a chamfered plinth, with rusticated quoins, moulded eaves, and a slate roof. There are three storeys and three bays. The doorway has tapering Tuscan pilasters and a segmental pediment, and the windows are sashes in stone surrounds.
Shepherd's Inn and stables 54.72976°N 2.59865°W		1789	The inn and the stables, which have been incorporated into the inn, are in sandstone with quoins and slate roofs. The original part is on a chamfered plinth, and has bands, moulded eaves, coped gables, two storeys and a symmetrical front of three bays. The central doorway has an architrave and a triangular pediment, and the windows are sashes. The stables to the right are lower, and contain a central segmental-headed wagon entrance, a garage door, two more doors, and 20th-century windows.
