= Staffield =

Hamlet in Cumbria, England

Coordinates: 54.7793°N 2.7109°W

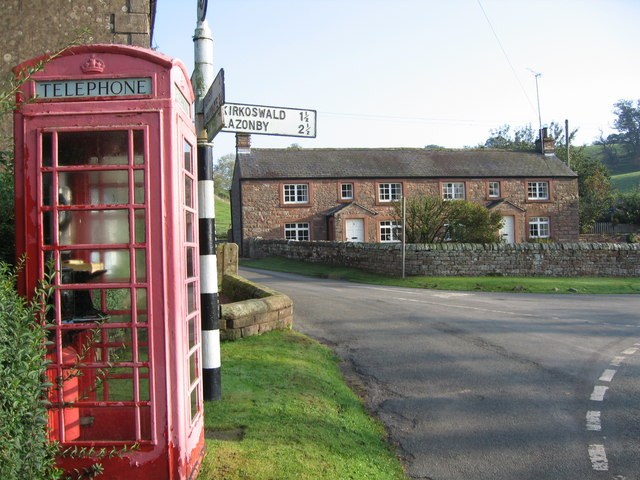

- Location in Eden, Cumbria Location within Cumbria
- Civil parish: Kirkoswald
- Unitary authority: Westmorland and Furness
- Ceremonial county: Cumbria
- Region: North West
- Country: England
- Sovereign state: United Kingdom
- Police: Cumbria
- Fire: Cumbria
- Ambulance: North West
- UK Parliament: Penrith and Solway

Staffield is a hamlet and former civil parish 12 miles (19 km) from Carlisle, now in the parish of Kirkoswald, in the Westmorland and Furness district, in the county of Cumbria, England. In 1931 the parish had a population of 193.

== History ==
The name "Staffield" means 'Isolated hill marked by a post'. Staffield was a township in Kirkoswald parish. From 1866 Staffield was a civil parish in its own right until it was merged with Kirkoswald on 1 April 1934.
