= Renwick, Cumbria =

Village in Cumbria, England

Coordinates: 54.785°N 2.628°W

Renwick
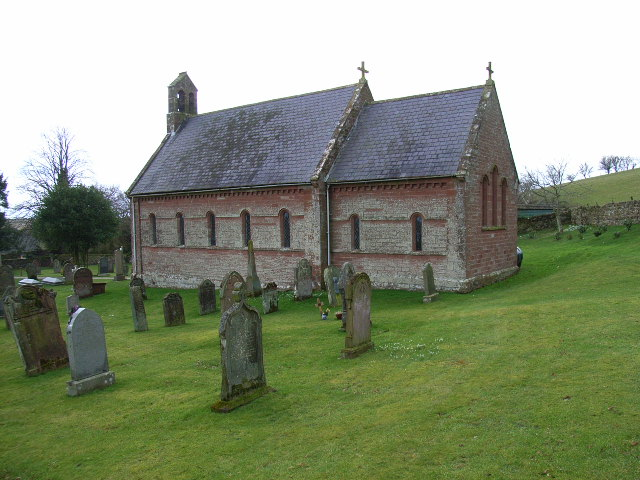
- All Saints' Church

- Location in Eden, Cumbria Location within Cumbria
- OS grid reference: NY596435
- Civil parish: Kirkoswald
- Unitary authority: Westmorland and Furness
- Ceremonial county: Cumbria
- Region: North West
- Country: England
- Sovereign state: United Kingdom
- Post town: PENRITH
- Postcode district: CA10
- Dialling code: 01768
- Police: Cumbria
- Fire: Cumbria
- Ambulance: North West
- UK Parliament: Penrith and Solway

Renwick, formerly known as Ravenwick, is a small village and former civil parish, now in the parish of Kirkoswald, in the Westmorland and Furness district, in the county of Cumbria, England. Renwick is located north east of Penrith between the A686 and B6413 roads. In 1931 the parish had a population of 174.

One mile south-east of the village in the hamlet of Haresceugh are the fragmentary remains of Haresceugh Castle, the site of which is now occupied by a farmhouse. Two sections of walling remain from the castle.

== Toponymy ==
"Renwick lies on Raven Beck..., but the probabilities are that the river-name is a back-formation from the place-name, and that Renwick is really 'Hrafn's wīc' ". ('Wīc' is Old English for 'farmstead' or 'settlement').

== History ==
According to local legend, the village was terrorized by a cockatrice around the year 1610 until it was killed by a local man of the Tallentire family, for which he and his heirs were exempted from tithes. This has grown into the story that when the locals were demolishing the old church in 1733 a cockatrice emerged from the ruins, and John Tallentire killed it with a rowan branch.

On 1 April 1934 the parish was abolished and merged into Kirkoswald.

== See also ==
- Listed buildings in Kirkoswald, Cumbria
