= Blencarn =

Village in Cumbria, England

Coordinates: 54.675°N 2.562°W

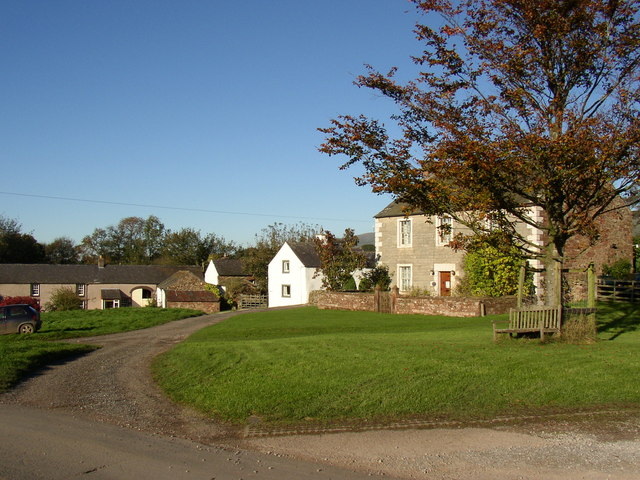
- The village green, Blencarn

- Location in Eden, Cumbria Location within Cumbria
- OS grid reference: NY637312
- Civil parish: Culgaith
- Unitary authority: Westmorland and Furness
- Ceremonial county: Cumbria
- Region: North West
- Country: England
- Sovereign state: United Kingdom
- Post town: PENRITH
- Postcode district: CA10
- Dialling code: 01768
- Police: Cumbria
- Fire: Cumbria
- Ambulance: North West
- UK Parliament: Penrith and Solway

Blencarn is a village in the civil parish of Culgaith, in the Westmorland and Furness district, in the ceremonial county of Cumbria, England. The village is situated at the foot of the Pennines.

It has a small village hall that used to be a school.

In Blencarn there is fly fishing at the 15-acre (61,000 m^{2}) Blencarn lake.

== Geography ==
Blencarn is located in the Eden valley near the Pennines. Blencarn is situated 2.86 km west of Kirkland fell and Cross Fell. A number of streams run nearby: Blencarn Beck, Crowdundle Beck, Skirwith Beck, Kirkland Beck, Sunndgill Beck and Aigill Sike as well as Blencarn lake. The village of Kirkland is located 1.31 km northeast. The village of Milburn is located 2.26 km south and the village of Skirwith 2.05 km north.

== History ==
There has been activity near Blencarn as early as the Roman era. An old Roman road known as Maiden Way once ran nearby and 1.27 km northeast near the farm of Ranbeck lies various ancient "cultivation terraces" known as "The Hanging Walls of Mark Antony".

Blencarn is marked as "Blenkerne" on Christopher Saxton’s 1579 map of Westmorland and Cumberland, as "Blenkern" on a 1760 map of the area and as its current name on Carry's 1794 map of England, Scotland and Wales.

=== 1988 crash ===
On Tuesday 9 August 1988 at 9.30pm two Panavia Tornado aircraft collided from RAF Cottesmore TTTE and 617 Sqn at RAF Marham. All were killed. The Marham aircraft 'ZA593' had pilot Flt Lt Colin Douglas Oliver, aged 30, from Swaffham, originally from Bristol, and navigator Flt Lt Anthony Cook, aged 29, from King's Lynn, and married with two children. The Cottesmore aircraft 'ZA329' had pilot Flt Lt John Watts, aged 32, from Castle Bytham in Lincolnshire, but originally from Surrey, an instructor who was married, with a German trainee navigator Lt Ulrich Sayer, aged 23.

== Notable people ==
It is the home of the notable painter and printmaker Alan Stones.
