= Kirkandrews-on-Eden =

Coordinates: 54.916°N 3.010°W

- Village
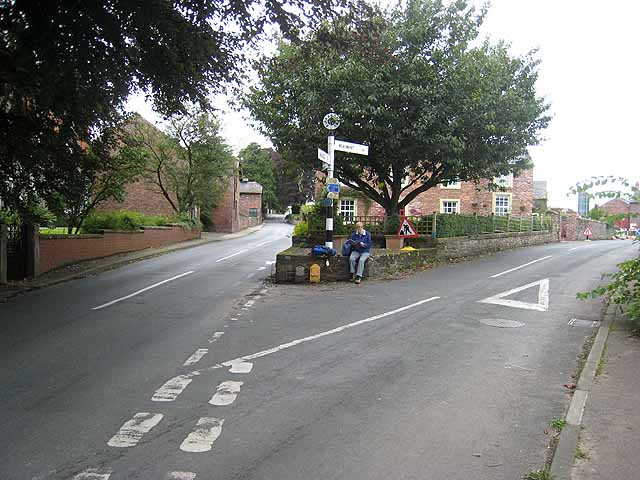
- Road junction, Kirkandrews-on-Eden

- Location in the former Carlisle district, Cumbria Location within Cumbria
- OS grid reference: NY352583
- Civil parish: Beaumont
- Unitary authority: Cumberland
- Ceremonial county: Cumbria
- Region: North West
- Country: England
- Sovereign state: United Kingdom
- Post town: CARLISLE
- Postcode district: CA5
- Dialling code: 01228
- Police: Cumbria
- Fire: Cumbria
- Ambulance: North West
- UK Parliament: Carlisle

Kirkandrews-on-Eden or Kirkandrews-upon-Eden, in the past known as Kirkanders, is a village and former civil parish, now in the civil parish of Beaumont, in the Cumberland unitary authority area of Cumbria, England. The village is 4 miles northwest of Carlisle. Kirkandrews forms part of the Barony of Burgh together with the nearby villages Monkhill, Grinsdale, Rattlingate and Burgh-by-Sands. In 1931 the civil parish had a population of 145.

== History ==
Hadrian's Wall Path and the Vallum run through the village. The village is 500m from the River Eden along which the Cumbrian Coastal Walk runs. It contains several examples of interesting listed buildings, Hollow Creek Farm; built in 1760, The Manor House, The Croft; built in the 1600s, The Beeches, Beech House are Grade II listed. National Cycle Network Route 72, Hadrian's Cycleway, stretches 160 miles along the Hadrian's Wall World Heritage Site from Ravenglass on the Cumbrian coast via Kirkandrews-on-Eden to Tynemouth near Newcastle upon Tyne.

The Church of St. Andrew, which formerly stood here and gave a name to the village, disappeared long ago, and nothing now remains to point out its site, save the undulations of the greensward and the well of St. Andrew found in the old graveyard. Since the year 1692, Kirkandrews has been united with Beaumont in all ecclesiastical matters, and St. Mary's Church at Beaumont and Beaumont Parish Hall in Kirkandrews serve both parishes.

The civil parish was merged into Beaumont on 1 April 1934.

== Transport ==
Evidence of the Carlisle Canal, later converted to the Carlisle to Silloth Railway, are to be found in the village and surrounding fields. Kirkandrews railway station was a victim of the 1964 Beeching cuts.

== See also ==
- Listed buildings in Beaumont, Cumbria
