= Beaumont, Cumbria =

Village and civil parish in the City of Carlisle district of Cumbria, England

Coordinates: 54.92456°N 3.01808°W

Beaumont
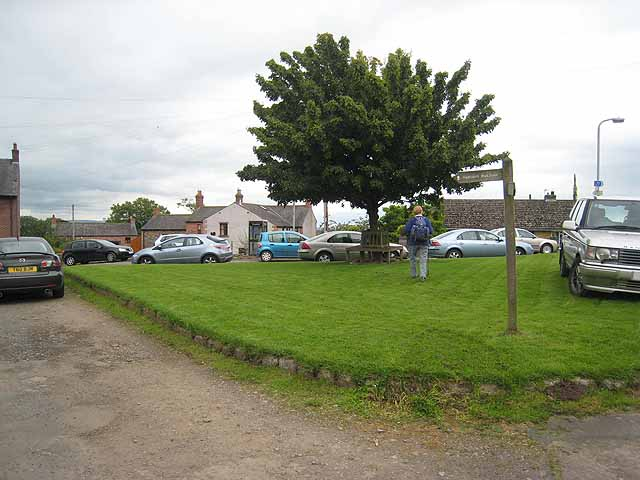
- Village Green, Beaumont

- Location within Cumbria
- Population: 478 (2021 census)
- Civil parish: Beaumont
- Unitary authority: Cumberland
- Ceremonial county: Cumbria
- Region: North West
- Country: England
- Sovereign state: United Kingdom
- Post town: CARLISLE
- Postcode district: CA5
- Dialling code: 01228
- Police: Cumbria
- Fire: Cumbria
- Ambulance: North West
- UK Parliament: Carlisle

Beaumont (pronounced locally as bee-mont) is a village and civil parish in the Cumberland district of Cumbria, England. The village lies four miles north-west of Carlisle on the banks of the River Eden. In 2021 the parish had a population of 478.

== Description ==
The civil parish of Beaumont includes the surrounding villages of Kirkandrews-on-Eden, Grinsdale and Monkhill. The parish is bordered by the River Eden to the north and east, and by the parishes of Burgh by Sands to the west and Orton to the south.

The village has very limited facilities; although it has a pub: The Drover's Rest. There is no school, post office or shop.

== History ==
Beaumont's name, as suggested by the French translation 'beautiful mount', comes from its high setting.

The manor was anciently held by the Brun family, Lords of Bowness, who were patrons also of the church. Before the year 1380 it became the property of the Dacres, and was annexed to the Barony of Burgh, belonging to the Earl of Lonsdale. The church is in the diocese and deanery of Carlisle. This small rectory was augmented by Queen Anne's Bounty in 1772.

The Carlisle canal ran through the parish, admitting sixty tonne vessels.

In 1961 there were 128 houses in Beaumont. The current average property value is £218,568, compared to an average property value of £218,108 for CA5; This figure is just slightly above the current UK average.

FRom 1974 to 2023 it was in Carlisle non-metropolitan district.

== St Mary's Church ==
St Mary's is an Anglican church built by the Normans in 1296 on the site of a turret on Hadrian's Wall. Visible from the church are the Solway Firth and Scotland to the north; the Lake District, Carlisle and the Pennines to the east.

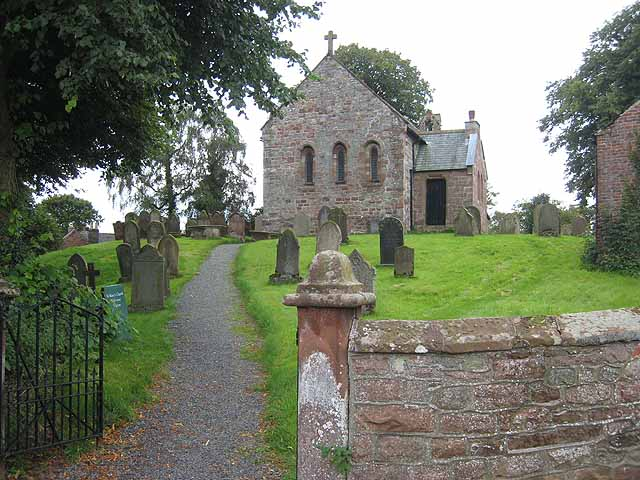
St Mary's Church

The building is constructed from squared and coursed sandstone from the nearby wall, the line of which runs directly beneath the church, with a graduated roof made from greenslate, coped gables and a cross finial. Little remains of the original church although the single chamber interior is still mostly of the earlier period, notably the south doorway and three east windows, but the church underwent restorations in 1784, 1872 and 1888. The single chamber is still mostly of the earlier period, notably the south doorway and three east windows. The windows, porch and vestry are 19th-century restorations, and the king post open timber roof dates from the 15th century. Hadrian's Wall Path passes the church, on its way from Carlisle to Bowness-on-Solway (via Grinsdale and Burgh-by-Sands). The church became a Grade II listed building on 1 May 1957.

Features of the church include two medieval grave slabs discovered during a series of Victorian restorations, built into the west wall behind the font. To celebrate the church's 700th anniversary in 1996, kneelers were made to commemorate Rectors in each century; Sir Elias de Thirwall was the first, his tenure starting in 1296.

The church maintains two traditions at weddings. The groom cuts a string tying the church gates shut, bestowing good luck to the couple; and a piece of rope is stretched across the road where wedding cars can pass only if they give money to the children.

== Heritage ==
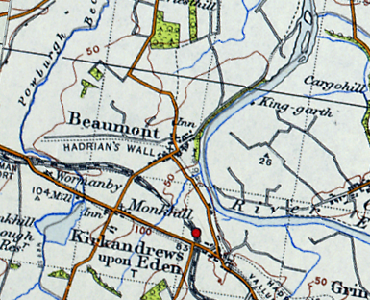
Beaumont

There are 7 listed buildings and 3 scheduled ancient monuments in Beaumont as well as it lying within a World Heritage Site.

Grade II

- Beaumont House
- Hillcrest
- Eden Bank Farmhouse
- Churchyard wall south of Church of St Mary
- Orchard House
- Myrtle Cottage

Grade II*

- Church of St Mary

Scheduled Monument

- Beaumont motte castle and section of Hadrian's Wall in wall mile 70 including turret 70a
- Hadrian's Wall between the field boundary to the south of the site of St Andrew's Church and Eden Bank at Beaumont in wall miles 69 and 70
- Burgh by Sands Roman fort, Beaumont camp, Burgh Castle and Hadrian's Wall from boundary west of churchyard, Beaumont to Burgh Head in wall miles 70 and 71

World Heritage Sites Buffer Zone

- Frontiers of the Roman Empire (Hadrian's Wall)

== See also ==
- Solway Plain
