= Bromfield, Cumbria =

Village and civil parish in England

Coordinates: 54.81°N 3.285°W

Bromfield
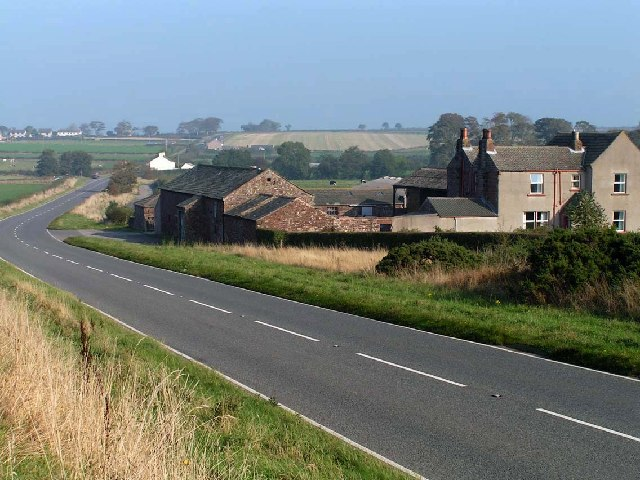
- Main road near Bromfield

- Location in Allerdale, Cumbria Location within Cumbria
- Population: 510 (2011)
- OS grid reference: NY3448
- Civil parish: Bromfield
- Unitary authority: Cumberland
- Ceremonial county: Cumbria
- Region: North West
- Country: England
- Sovereign state: United Kingdom
- Post town: Wigton
- Postcode district: CA7
- Dialling code: 01697
- Police: Cumbria
- Fire: Cumbria
- Ambulance: North West
- UK Parliament: Penrith and Solway

Bromfield is a village and civil parish in Cumbria, in the north of England.

It is about five miles north-east of Aspatria. According to the 2001 census the parish had a population of 530, decreasing to 510 at the 2011 census. It has two farms, a church dedicated to St Mungo, and a pub.

== Toponymy ==
According to one source the origins of the name of Bromfield (Brounefeld) comes from the old English brun + feld, meaning 'brown open land, or open land where broom grows'.

== Governance ==
Bromfield is part of the parliamentary constituency of Penrith and Solway.

For Local Government purposes it is in the Cumberland unitary authority area.

== The manor ==
The old ecclesiastic parish of Bromfield, consisted of twelve villages or hamlets, Allonby, Westnewton, Mealrigg, Langrigg, Crookdake, Scales, Bromfield, Blencogo, Wheyrigg, Dundraw, Moor Row and Kelsick. But in accordance with the Local Government Act 1894, Allonby, Westnewton and Mealrigg became a joint independent parish, although the vicar of Bromfield retained the right to appoint the vicar; while Wheyrigg, Dundraw, Moor Row and Kelsick became part of the parish of Waverton. The locality is steeped in history, dating back to early times. The manor of the village itself was granted by the first Lord of Allerdale to Melbeth, his physician whose posterity took the name of De Brumfield. The family ceased to be Lords of the Manor somewhere around 1300. In early mediaeval times the patronage of the church was reserved and granted to the St Mary's Abbey, York. In 1434 the Abbey leased these lands for a term of six years to William Osmotherley. Holme Cultram Abbey also possessed land here. Prior to the dissolution of the monasteries the monks were not only cultivating the land but also leasing it to tenant farmers. In 1543, following the suppression we find a William Hutton holding Bromfield for King Henry VIII. Later Edward VI exchanged the manor with Henry Thompson for a hospital in Dover. Successive owners of the estate were the Porters of Weary Hall, and the families of Osmotherley and Barwise.

== The railway ==
The Maryport and Carlisle Railway intersects the southern portion of the parish. In 1859 a railway was laid through the village of Bromfield connecting the Maryport and Carlisle railway with the North British line from Silloth to Carlise. The subsequent station was opened on 8 August 1870 and was of great benefit to farmers who could move their livestock along the Solway Junction Railway to the auction Market in Annan, on a line passing through Bowness-on-Solway and across the now demolished viaduct over the Solway Firth. Passenger services were finally withdrawn in 1921 and the line south of Annan over the Solway Viaduct was closed completely. The line remained open to through traffic until 14 February 1933; the track was lifted and sold as scrap in 1937.

== The school ==
In 1612, Richard Osmotherley, a merchant of London and native of the parish, bequeathed £10 a year, to be paid by the Merchant Taylors Company out of his estates in St. Botolph's parish, Aldergate, London, to the Clergymen and Churchwardens of Bromfield, in trust for the education of fifteen poor children belonging to Bromfield and Langrigg. According to the stipulation the occupants of Langrigg Hall chose the children. It is said that the inhabitants built the school shortly after this. In 1741 the Rev. Dr Thomlinson gave a dwelling house, with outbuildings. In 1757 the Thomlinson gave £100 with which two fields were purchased, one in Bromfield the other in Blencogo. The family also built two rooms for the use of the schoolmaster, who was also curate of the parish. In 1770 a sum of £80 was collected by voluntary subscription, which generated £3 20p in annual interest. In 1805 a Mr. Thomlinson of New Bern, North Carolina gave £1,400 to be equally divided between the schools of Bromfield, Wigton, Uldale, and Thursby. During this time numerous masters taught the children to read, write and figure accounts, while several learned Latin. The Education Act of 1870 considerably modifies the constitution of the church and subsequent Acts brought it into line with other schools in the area.

== The church ==
St Mungo's Church, is an active Anglican parish church in the deanery of Solway, the archdeaconry of West Cumberland and the diocese of Carlisle. The church has been designated by English Heritage as a Grade I listed building. The church dates from the 12th century with additions and alterations during the next two centuries. Restorations were carried out in 1861–62, 1893–94 and 1926.

== Notable people ==
- Jenny Cowern, artist, lived at Langrigg, Aspatria
- Rae McGrath, Nobel Peace Prize co-Laureate (1997) and founder of the international charity Mines Advisory Group (MAG) lives in Langrigg

== See also ==
- Listed buildings in Bromfield, Cumbria

== Bibliography ==
- Rev. William Slater Calverley; W. G. Collingwood M.A. (1899). Early Sculptured Crosses, Shrines and Monuments in the Present Diocese of Carlisle. Kendal: Titus Wilson.
- A. D. Mills (1998). Oxford Dictionary of Place-Names. Oxford: Oxford.
- Sarah Hodgson (1960). A History of the Parish of Bromfield. Carlisle: Author.
- T. Bulmer (1901). History and Directory of Cumberland. Preston: T. Bulmer & Co. Hesperus Press Ltd.
- J. Rose; M. Dunglinson (1987). Aspatria. Chichester: Phillimore.
- Stuart Edgar; John M Sinton (1990). The Solway Junction Railway. Oxford: Oakwood Press.
