= Langrigg =

Hamlet in Cumbria, England

Coordinates: 54.8000°N 3.3015°W

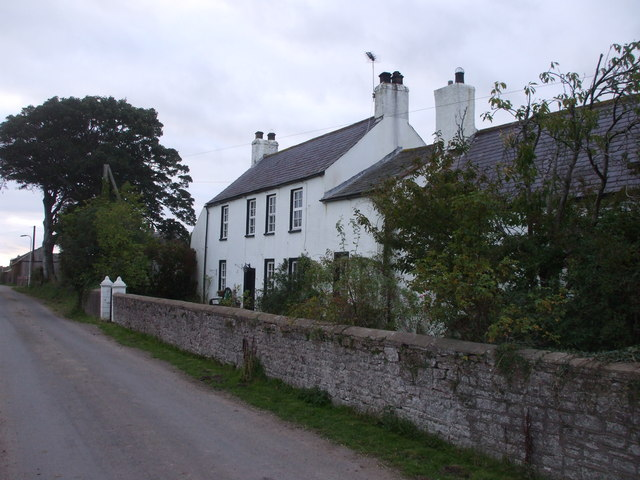
- House, Langrigg

- Location in Allerdale, Cumbria Location within Cumbria
- OS grid reference: NY163458
- Civil parish: Bromfield
- Unitary authority: Cumberland
- Ceremonial county: Cumbria
- Region: North West
- Country: England
- Sovereign state: United Kingdom
- Post town: WIGTON
- Postcode district: CA7
- Dialling code: 016973
- Police: Cumbria
- Fire: Cumbria
- Ambulance: North West
- UK Parliament: Penrith and Solway

Langrigg is a hamlet in Cumbria, England. It lies to the northeast of Aspatria and south of Abbeytown, just to the southwest of Bromfield. Historically, it formed part of the Langrigg and Mealrigg township, in the Parish of Bromfield, then an independent parish from 1894 until 1934.

== Geography ==
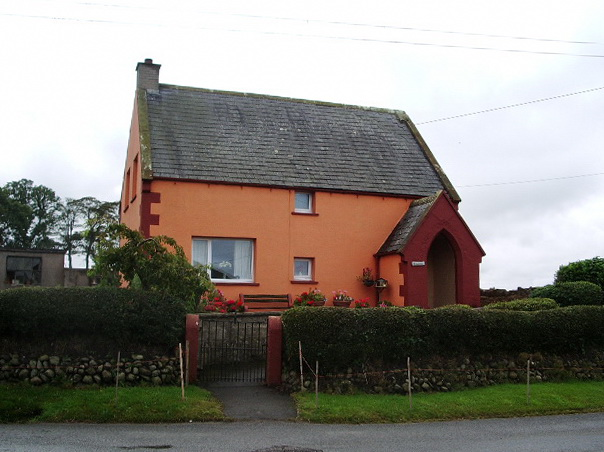
Threeways, Langrigg

Langrigg is located along the A596 road. It is relatively low-lying, at the extremity of what was described in the late 18th century as a "dull and dreary common", although the land immediately around it is fertile. Its name, which means long ridge in the Cumbrian dialect, is derived from the ridge of land along which it is located to the east of Bromfield. A river, named Ranny Gill, flows on the eastern side of the village. The township covers an area of 865 ha and includes part of Bromfield Common. A stream known locally as Dub Stangs rises to the west of Langrigg, and flows into the Solway Firth at Allonby Bay.

== History ==
Waldieve, Lord of Allerdale, gave the manor of Langrigg to Dolphin, son of Aylward, whose family held it for generations until it fell to a family who took their name from the township. A Thomas de Langrigg once held property in Langrigg during the reign of Henry II, Langrigg Hall being the principal manor house. Agnes, wife of Gilbert de Langrigg, is documented to have "demanded against John Crookdake 25 acres of land, 15 acres of meadow, and 2s 4d rent there; and against Thomas de Langrigg 30 acres of land, and 14 acres of meadow". The historical township includes Bromfield, Greenhow and Crookdake, the latter of which was held for many years by the Musgrave family.

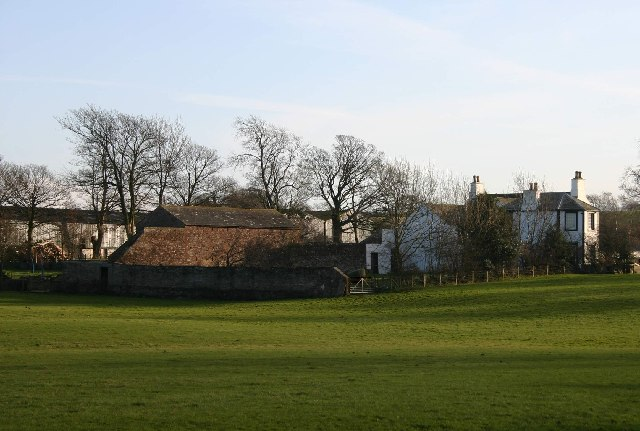
Langrigg Hall

Langrigg later fell into the Porter and Osmunderly families; the Osmunderly were of Lancashire origin. The Porters held the manor, while the Osmunderlys held the demesne. It was owned by William Osmunderly, Sheriff of Cumberland, during the reign of Henry IV. The last of the Osmunderleys, Reverend Salkend Osmunderely, sold the manor to his son in-law Thomas Barwis in 1735 (Barwis is credited with reconstructing the Langrigg Hall). John Barwis (1775–1818), who was also Rector of Niton in the Isle of Wight, was one of its prominent owners. and his son William Barwis, was still in possession of Langrigg manor in 1860. In 1876, its ownership changed to Joseph Bowerbank of Cockermouth. The township of Langrigg had a population of 198 in 1801, 194 in 1821, 269 in 1841, and 281 in 1851. The united township of Langrigg and Mealrigg in Bromfield parish became an independent parish following the Local Government Act 1894, although for ecclesiastical purposes it remained attached to Bromfield. Langrigg Hall Farm produces free-range eggs for Morrisons supermarket.

== Economy ==
Tile-making has been a local industry since the 19th century. A windmill was also established here in the 19th century.

== Notable people ==
- Jenny Cowern, artist, lived at Langrigg, Aspatria
- Rae McGrath, Nobel Peace co-Laureate, founder of the Mines Advisory Group (MAG), author and humanitarian activist has lived in Langrigg since 1994.

== See also ==
- Listed buildings in Bromfield, Cumbria

== General and cited sources ==
- Bulmer, T. (1901). History, topography, and directory of Cumberland: comprising its history and archaeology : a general view of its physical and geological features, with separate historical and topographical descriptions of each town, parish, manor, and extra-parochial liberty (Public domain ed.). T. Snape.
- Burke, John; Burke, Bernard (1847). A Genealogical and Heraldic Dictionary of the Landed Gentry of Great Britain & Ireland (Public domain ed.). H. Colburn.
- Hutchinson, William (1794). The History of the County of Cumberland: And Some Places Adjacent, from the Earliest Accounts to the Present Time (Public domain ed.). London: F. Jollie. p. 301.
- Lysons, Samuel (1816). Magna Britannia, a concise topographical account of the several counties of Great Britain, by D. and S. Lysons (Public domain ed.).
- Nicolson, Joseph; Burn, Richard; Nicolson, William; Scott, Daniel; Hornyold-Strickland, Henry (1777). The history and antiquities of the counties of Westmorland and Cumberland (Public domain ed.). Printed for W. Strahan.
- Whellan, William (1860). The History and Topography of the Counties of Cumberland and Westmoreland: With Furness and Cartmel, in Lancashire, Comprising Their Ancient and Modern History, a General View of Their Physical Character, Trade, Commerce, Manufactures, Agricultural Condition, Statistics, Etc., Etc (Public domain ed.). W. Whellan and Company. p. 216.
