= Saint Mungo =

Missionary in the British Kingdom of Strathclyde (518–614)

Saint Kentigern alias Mungo
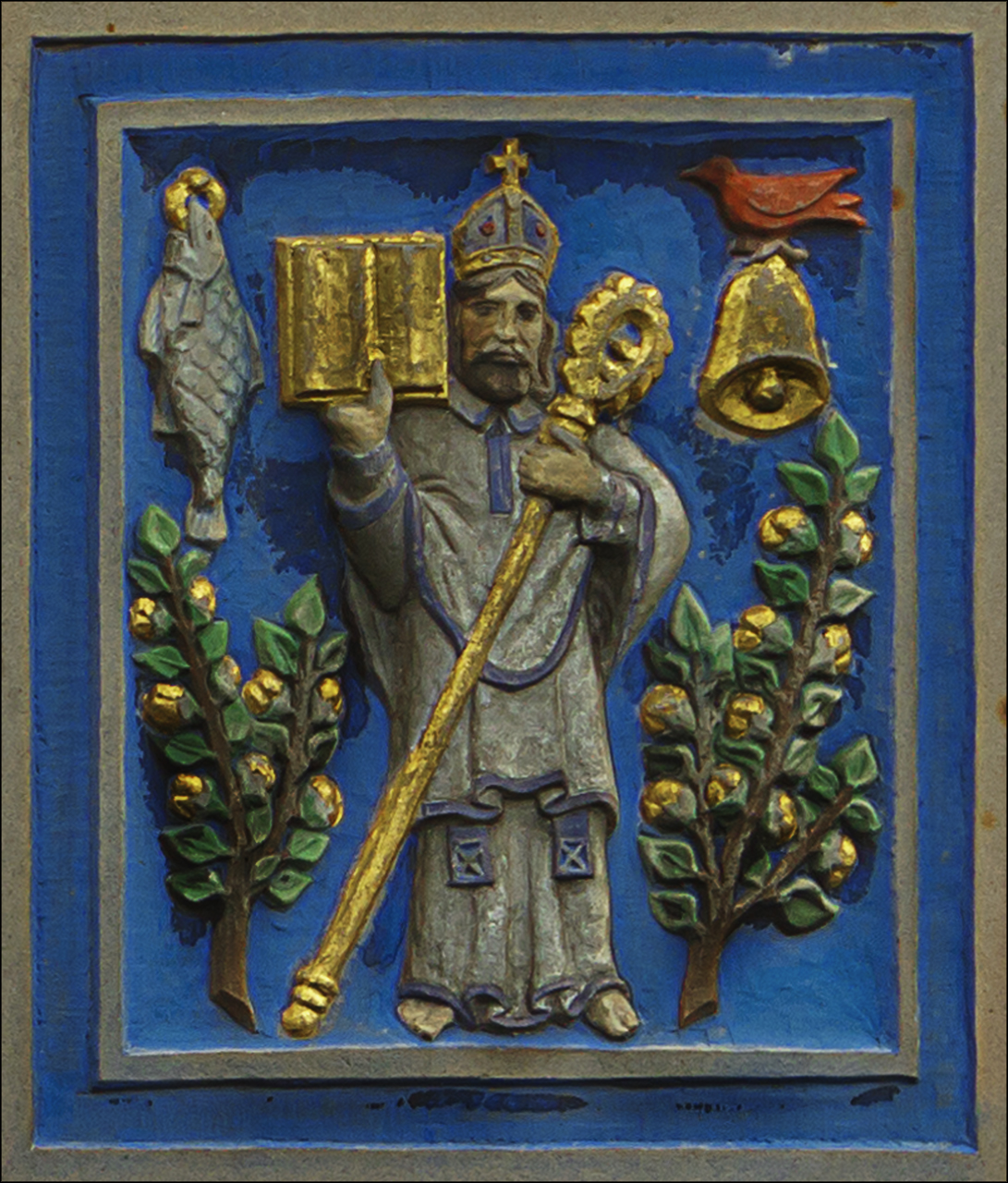
- Kentigern with a robin, a bell and a fish with a ring in its mouth
- Born: 518 AD; Culross
- Died: 13 January 614 (aged 95–96); Glasgow, Kingdom of Strathclyde
- Venerated in: Presbyterian Church; Anglican Communion; Roman Catholic Church; Eastern Orthodox Church
- Major shrine: Glasgow Cathedral
- Feast: 13 January
- Attributes: Bishop with a robin on his shoulder; holding a bell and a fish with a ring in its mouth
- Patronage: Glasgow; Scotland; Penicuik; salmon; those accused of infidelity; against bullies

Kentigern (Welsh: Cyndeyrn Garthwys; Latin: Kentigernus), known as Mungo, was a missionary in the Brittonic Kingdom of Alt Clut in the late sixth century, and the founder and patron saint of the city of Glasgow.

== Name ==
In Wales and England, this saint is known by his birth and baptismal name Kentigern (Welsh: Cyndeyrn). This name probably comes from the British *Cuno-tigernos, which is composed of the elements *cun, a hound, and *tigerno, a lord, prince, or king. The evidence is based on the Old Welsh record Conthigirn(i). Other etymologies have been suggested, including British *Kintu-tigernos 'chief prince' based on the English form Kentigern, but the Old Welsh form above and Old English Cundiʒeorn do not appear to support this.

Particularly in Scotland, he is known by the pet name Mungo, possibly derived from the Cumbric equivalent of the Welsh: fy nghu 'my dear (one)'. The Mungo pet name or hypocorism has a Gaelic parallel in the form Mo Choe or Mo Cha, under which guise Kentigern appears in Kirkmahoe, for example, in Dumfriesshire, which appears as ecclesia Sancti Kentigerni in the Arbroath Liber in 1321. An ancient church in Bromfield, Cumbria, is named after him, as are Crosthwaite Parish Church and some other churches in the northern part of Cumbria, for example St Mungo's Church, Dearham.

== Biographers ==
The Life of Saint Mungo was written by the monastic hagiographer Jocelin of Furness in about 1185. Jocelin states that he rewrote the Life from an earlier Glasgow legend and an Old Irish document. There are certainly two other medieval lives: the earlier partial life in the Cottonian manuscript now in the British Library, and the later Life, based on Jocelin, by John of Tynemouth.

== Life ==
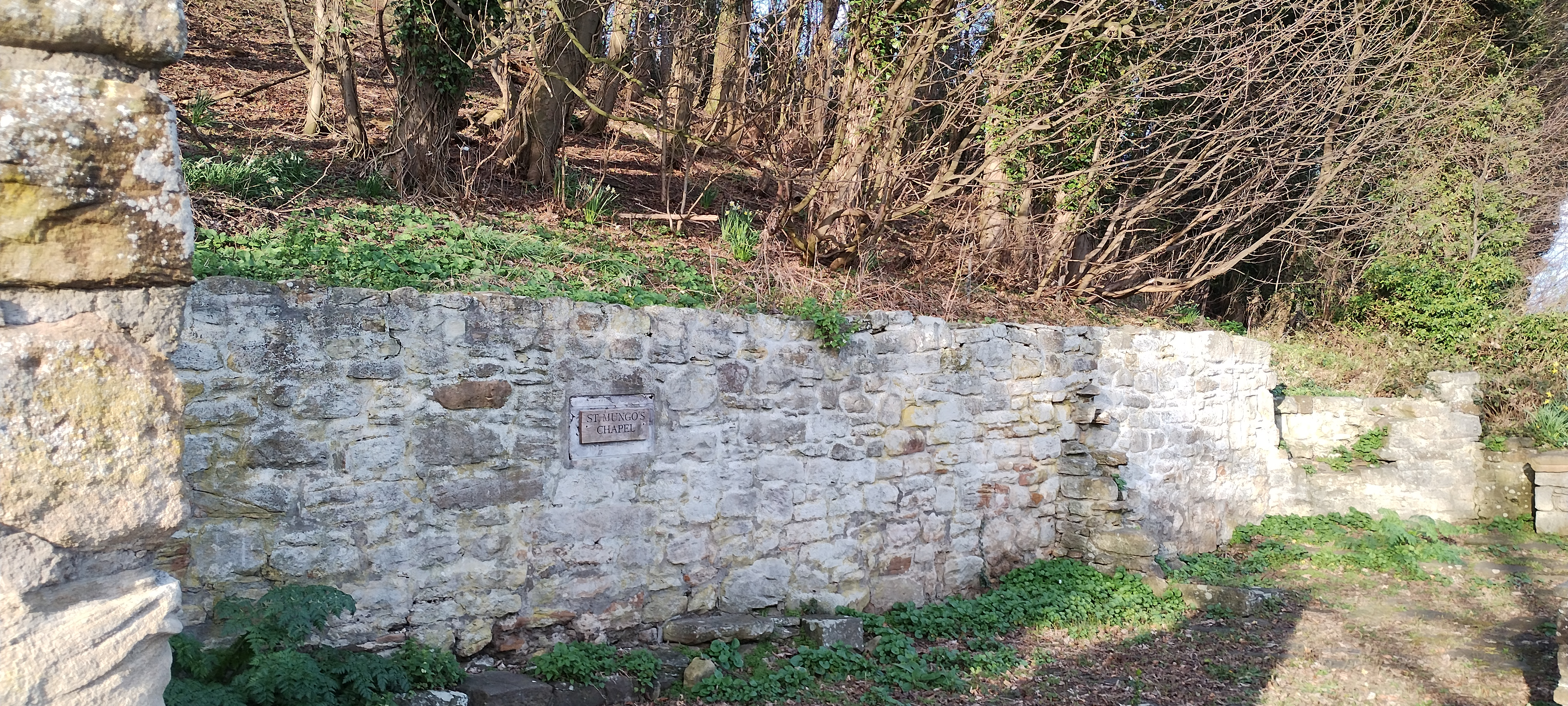
"St Mungo's Chapel" in Culross. The chapel occupies a site traditionally regarded as the birthplace of Mungo

Mungo's mother Teneu was a princess, the daughter of King Lleuddun (Latin: Leudonus) who ruled a territory around what is now Lothian in Scotland, perhaps the kingdom of Gododdin in the Old North. She became pregnant after being raped by Owain mab Urien according to the British Library manuscript. However, other historic accounts claim Owain and Teneu had a love affair whilst he was still married to his wife Penarwen and that her father, King Lot, separated the pair after she became pregnant. Later, allegedly, after Penarwen died, Teneu returned to King Owain and the pair were able to marry before King Owain met his death battling Bernicia in 597 AD.

Her furious father had her thrown from the heights of Traprain Law. Surviving, she was then abandoned in a coracle in which she drifted across the Firth of Forth to Culross in Fife. There Mungo was born.

Mungo was brought up by Saint Serf who was ministering to the Picts in that area. It was Serf who gave him his popular pet-name. At the age of twenty-five, Mungo began his missionary labours on the Clyde, on the site of modern Glasgow. He built his church across the water from an extinct volcano, next to the Molendinar Burn, where the present medieval cathedral now stands. For some thirteen years, he laboured in the district, living a most austere life in a small cell and making many converts by his holy example and his preaching.

A strong anti-Christian movement in Strathclyde, headed by a certain King Morken, compelled Mungo to leave the district, and he retired to Wales, via Cumbria, staying for a time with Saint David at St David's, and afterwards moving on to Gwynedd where he founded a cathedral at Llanelwy (St Asaph in English). While there, he undertook a pilgrimage to Rome. However, the new King of Strathclyde, Riderch Hael, invited Mungo to return to his kingdom. He decided to go and appointed Saint Asaph/Asaff as Bishop of Llanelwy in his place.

For some years, Mungo fixed his Episcopal seat at Hoddom in Dumfriesshire, evangelising thence the district of Galloway. He eventually returned to Glasgow where a large community grew up around him. It was nearby, in Kilmacolm, that he was visited by Saint Columba, who was at that time labouring in Strathtay. The two saints embraced, held long converse, and exchanged their pastoral staves. In old age, Mungo became very feeble and his chin had to be set in place with a bandage. He is said to have died in his bath, on Sunday 13 January.

== Miracles ==
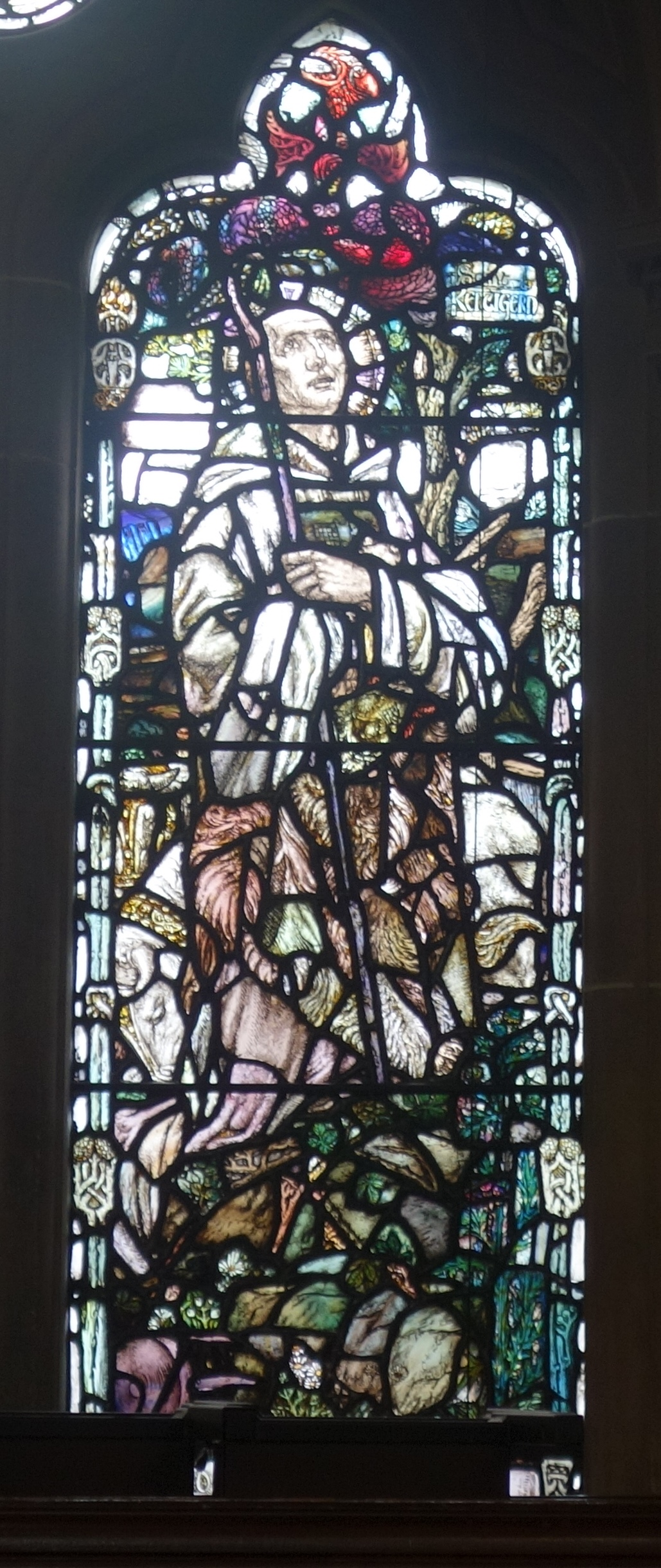
Saint Mungo (University of Glasgow)

In the Life of Saint Mungo, he performed four miracles in Glasgow. The following verse is used to remember Mungo's four miracles:

Here is the bird that never flew
Here is the tree that never grew
Here is the bell that never rang
Here is the fish that never swam

The verses refer to the following:

- The Bird: Mungo restored life to a robin that had been killed by some of his classmates.
- The Tree: Mungo had been left in charge of a fire in Saint Serf's monastery. He fell asleep and the fire went out. Taking a hazel branch, he restarted the fire.
- The Bell: the bell is thought to have been brought by Mungo from Rome. It was said to have been used in services and to mourn the dead. The original bell no longer exists, and a replacement, created in the 1640s, is now on display in Glasgow.
- The Fish: refers to the story about Queen Languoreth of Strathclyde who was suspected of infidelity by her husband. King Riderch demanded to see her ring, which he claimed she had given to her lover. In reality the King had thrown it into the River Clyde. Faced with execution she appealed for help to Mungo, who ordered a messenger to catch a fish in the river. On opening the fish, the ring was miraculously found inside, which allowed the Queen to clear her name. (This story may be confused with an almost identical one concerning King Maelgwn of Gwynedd and Saint Asaph.)

== Analysis ==
Mungo's ancestry is recorded in the Bonedd y Saint. His father, Owain was a King of Rheged. His maternal grandfather, Lleuddun, was probably a King of the Gododdin; Lothian was named after him. There seems little reason to doubt that Mungo was one of the first evangelists of Strathclyde, under the patronage of King Rhiderch Hael, and probably became the first Bishop of Glasgow.

Jocelin seems to have altered parts of the original life that he did not understand; while adding others, like the trip to Rome, that served his own purposes, largely the promotion of the Bishopric of Glasgow. Some new parts may have been collected from genuine local stories, particularly those of Mungo's work in Cumbria. S. Mundahl-Harris has shown that Mungo's associations with St Asaph were a Norman invention. However, in Scotland, excavations at Hoddom have brought confirmation of early Christian activity there, uncovering a late 6th-century stone baptistery.

Details of Mungo's infirmity have a ring of authenticity about them. The year of Mungo's death is sometimes given as 603, but is recorded in the Annales Cambriae as 612. 13 January was a Sunday in both 603 and 614. David McRoberts has argued that his death in the bath is a garbled version of his collapse during a baptismal service.

In a late 15th-century fragmentary manuscript generally called 'Lailoken and Kentigern', Mungo appears in conflict with the mad prophet, Lailoken alias Merlin. Lailoken's appearance at the Battle of Arfderydd in 573 has led to a connection being made between this battle, the rise of Riderch Hael and the return of Mungo to Strathclyde.

The Life of Saint Mungo bears similarities with Chrétien de Troyes's French romance Yvain, the Knight of the Lion. In Chrétien's story, Yvain, a version of Owain mab Urien, courts and marries Laudine, only to leave her for a period to go adventuring. This suggests that the works share a common source.

== Veneration ==
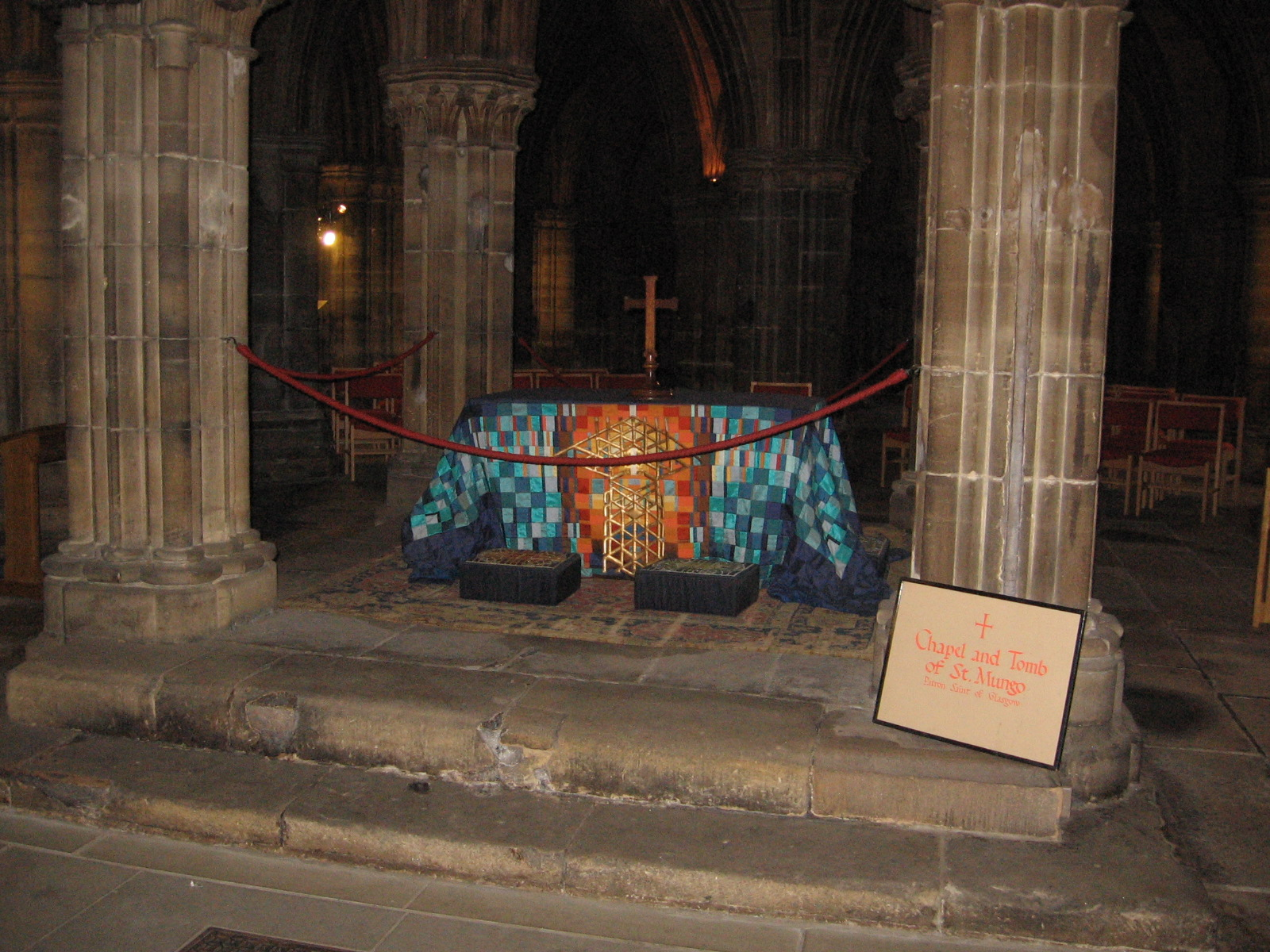
Tomb of St. Mungo in the crypt of Glasgow Cathedral

On the spot where Mungo was buried now stands the cathedral dedicated in his honour. His shrine was a great centre of Christian pilgrimage until the Scottish Reformation. His remains are said to still rest in the crypt. A spring called "St. Mungo's Well" fell eastwards from the apse.

His festival was kept throughout Scotland on 13 January. The Bollandists have printed a special mass for this feast, dating from the 13th century. His feast day in the West is 13 January. Within the Eastern Orthodox Church, his feast is also kept on 13 January in the Greek tradition, whereas it is celebrated on 14 January in the Russian Orthodox Church.

Mungo's four religious miracles in Glasgow are represented in the city's coat of arms. Glasgow's current motto Let Glasgow flourish by the preaching of His word and the praising of His name and the more secular Let Glasgow flourish, are both inspired by Mungo's original call "Let Glasgow flourish by the preaching of the word".

The Tron Steeple in Glasgow has a statue of St Mungo which emerges every hour, and depicts the saint with representations of his four miracles

Saint Mungo's Well was a cold water spring and bath at Copgrove, near Ripon, North Yorkshire, formerly believed effective for treating rickets.

Glasgow Fire Brigade also named their fireboat St. Mungo, which served around the Clyde from 1959 to 1975.

LNER Peppercorn Class A1 steam locomotive 60145 was named Saint Mungo, entering service with British Railways in 1949.

Mungo is remembered in the Church of England with a commemoration on 13 January.

=== Namesake churches, schools and charities ===
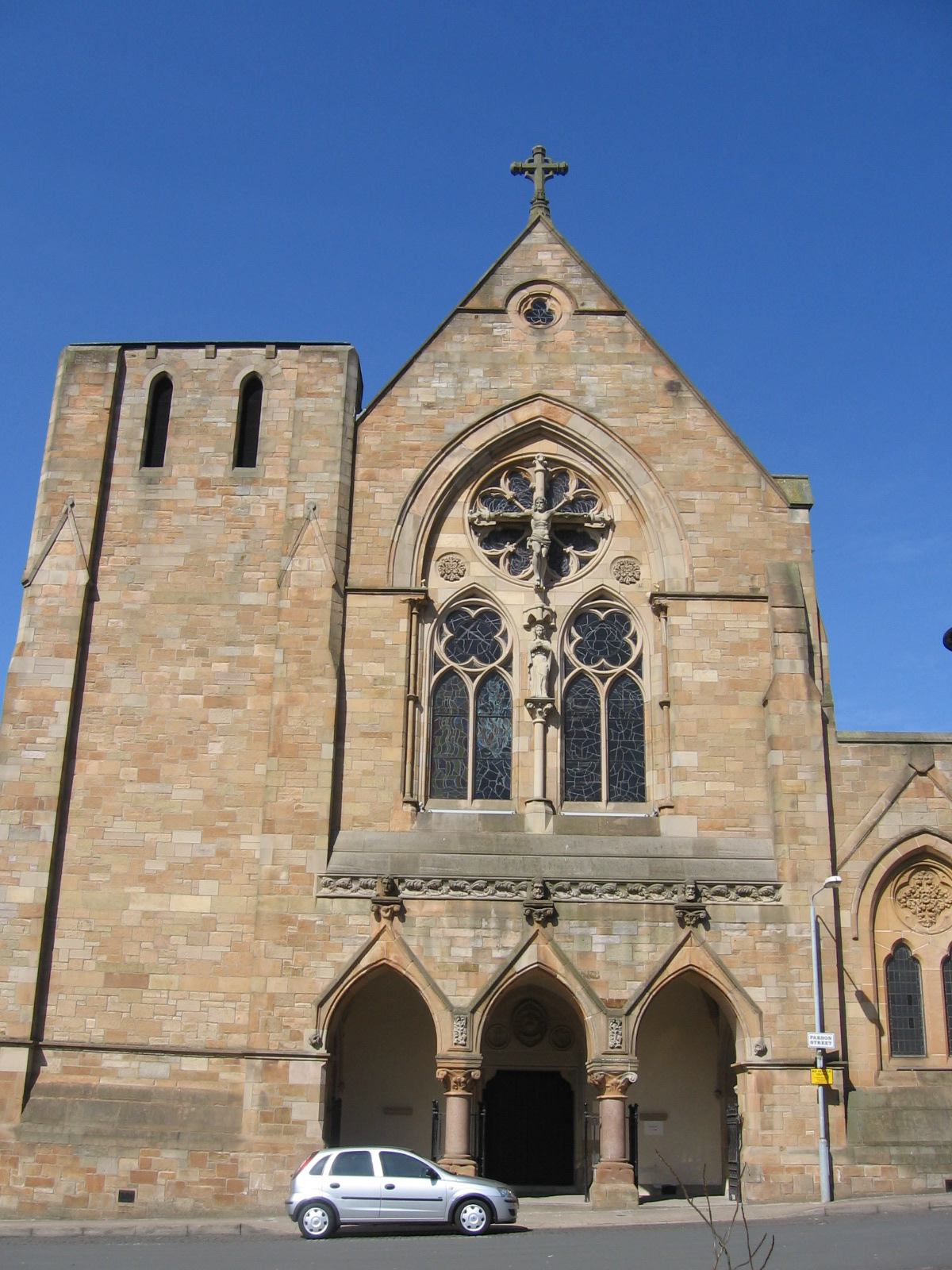
St Mungo's Church, Townhead, Glasgow

Saint Mungo founded a number of churches during his period as Archbishop of Strathclyde, of which Stobo Kirk is a notable example. At Townhead and Dennistoun in Glasgow, there is a modern Roman Catholic church and a traditional Scottish Episcopal Church respectively dedicated to the saint.

St Mungo's Academy is a Roman Catholic, co-educational, comprehensive, secondary school located in Bridgeton, Glasgow.

St Asaph / Llanelwy in North Wales is home to St Kentigern Hospice which offers palative and end of life care to the people of Denbighshire & parts of Flintshire and Conwy. Saint Kentigern, also known by his affectionate nickname Mungo (My Dear One) is believed to have founded the monastery in Llaenlwy (St Asaph) until his return to Scotland in 573AD.

Another church established by the saint himself was St Kentigern's Church of Lanark, founded shortly before his death, and which now stands in ruins. Another church called St Kentigern's was built in the town in the late 19th century. It is still present but has been converted to housing and office space.

In Kilmarnock, a Church of Scotland congregation is named St Kentigern's.

St. Kentigern's Academy opened in Blackburn, West Lothian in September 1974.

In Alloa, a chapel dedicated to St. Mungo is thought to have been erected during the fourteenth or fifteenth-century. The present Church of Scotland St. Mungo's Parish Church in Alloa was built in 1817.

In Cumbernauld, there is St. Mungo's Parish Church in the centre of the New Town.

The Cumbrian village of Mungrisdale (literally 'valley of the loved pigs') is likely named after St Mungo, and has a church dedicated to him, though until 1600 it appears only to have been referred to as Grisedale. Also in Cumbria, the villages of Caldbeck and Bromfield both have churches and wells dedicated to Kentigern. Other Cumbrian churches dedicated to him include Castle Sowerby, Crosthwaite (near Keswick), Dearham and Irthington.

There is a St Kentigern's school and church in Blackpool.

The Catholic Church in Melling, Merseyside is named St. Kentigen.

In Falkirk, there is a St. Mungo's High School.

In Grinsdale, Cumbria there is a church venerated to St. Kentigern.

Also in Cumbria, there are two Greek Orthodox Communities venerated to St. Mungo/Kentigern, one in Dalton-in-Furness and the other in Keswick.

In Fallowfield, a suburb of the city of Manchester, a Roman Catholic church is dedicated to Saint Kentigern.

St Kentigern's is a small Roman Catholic Church in the village of Eyeries, on the Beara peninsula in West Cork, Ireland.

Mungo or Kentigern is the patron of a Presbyterian church school in Auckland, New Zealand, which has two campuses: Saint Kentigern College, a secondary co-ed college in the suburb of Pakuranga, and a joint Boys School, Girls School and Pre-School in the suburb of Remuera.

There is a United Church of Canada charge in Cushing Quebec Canada, Saint Mungo's United Church. Built in the 1836 originally as a Church of Scotland, it has recently been restored for its 180th anniversary.

Although secular, the English charity for the support and empowerment of the homeless, St. Mungo's, was named after the saint by its founder. The Glasgow-born Harry Stone named it in honour of the patron saint of his birth city when the charity was established in 1969. Saint Mungo's runs hostels, outreach, emergency shelters, and employment and training services. It provides an online and in-person "Recovery College" free to its students.

The ruinous St. Mungo's Chapel (also known as St. Serf's Chapel) in Culross is traditionally said to have been built on the site of Mungo's birth place. Founded in 1503, it later fell into ruin and was silted up. The site was excavated in 1926. It is now a scheduled monument.

== Fiction ==
In the short story "The Wrong Shape," found in The Innocence of Father Brown by G. K. Chesterton, St. Mungo is mentioned as the saint for which Father Brown's church is named.

St. Mungo is a primary antagonist in the book The Lost Queen by Signe Pike. He is portrayed as vindictive, cruel, and malicious.

St. Mungo's Hospital for Magical Maladies and Injuries is the primary hospital of Magical Britain in the Harry Potter series of books by J. K. Rowling.

Kentigern Gardens is the location of a murder in The Cuckoo's Calling, a novel published under J. K. Rowling's pseudonym of Robert Galbraith.

Mungo is the main character in Young Mungo, a novel by Douglas Stuart. The name holds symbolic importance for the character's story.

Mungo's tomb is featured in the book Raven Nightshade: The Demon Sword in the series of books by Martin Roy, where it is described as containing a cup of coffee, adding an intriguing and surreal detail to the narrative.

== See also ==
- St Kentigern's Church – dedicated churches
- Saint Mungo, patron saint archive

== Sources and references ==
- The Magnificent Gael [Reginald B. Hale] 1976, World Media Productions* Baring-Gould, Sabine & Fisher, John (1907: 2000) Lives of the British Saints. 8 vols. Felinfach: Llanerch (Facsim. reprint in 8 parts of the 4 vol. ed. published: London: Honourable Society of Cymmrodorion, 1907–1913.)
- Chesterton, G.K. (1911). The Innocence of Father Brown.
- Chrétien de Troyes; Burton Raffel, ed. (1987) Yvain, the Knight of the Lion. New Haven: Yale University Press.
- Davies, John Reuben, "Bishop Kentigern among the Britons," in Boardman, Steve, John Reuben Davies, Eila Williamson (eds), Saints' Cults in the Celtic World (Woodbridge, Boydell Press, 2009) (Studies in Celtic History),
- Delaney, John J. (1983) Pocket Dictionary of Saints. Image Books.
- Lowe, Chris (1999) Angels, Fools and Tyrants. Edinburgh: Canongate Books & Historic Scotland
- Rees, Elizabeth (2000) Celtic Saints: passionate wanderers. London: Thames & Hudson
- "St. Kentigern". "The Catholic Encyclopedia". New Advent.
- Tranter, Nigel (1993) Druid Sacrifice. London: Hodder & Stoughton (historical novel)
- Wade-Evans, A. W. (1934) Welsh Christian Origins. Oxford: Alden Press
- McArthur Irvin, Lindsay, "Building a British Identity: Jocelin of Furness's Use of Sources in Vita Kentigerni," in Identity and Alterity in Hagiography and the Cult ofSaints, eds. Ana Marinkovic and Trpimir Vedris (Zagreb: Hagiotheca, 2010), 103–117
  - "Identity and Alterity in Hagiography and the Cult of Saints". Centreleonardboyle.com. 19 December 2010. Archived from the original on 8 July 2011.
