= Cowern =

Cowern is a surname. Notable people with the surname include:

- Dianna Cowern (born 1989), American YouTuber
- Jenny Cowern (1943–2005), English artist
- Raymond Teague Cowern (1913–1986), British painter and illustrator
