= St Kentigern's Church =

St Kentigern's Church may refer to:

== Churches in Scotland ==
- St Kentigern's Church, Lanark (Hyndford Road), ruined church in Lanark
- St Kentigern's Church, Lanark (Hope Street), newer church in Lanark, distinct from St Kentigern's Church, Lanark (Hyndford Road)
- St Kentigern's Church, Ballater, Aberdeenshire
- St Kentigern's Church, Edinburgh (Union Canal)

== Churches in England ==
- St Kentigern's Church, Caldbeck, Cumbria
- St. Kentigern's Church, Aspatria, Cumbria
- St Kentigern's Church, Crosthwaite, Keswick, Cumbria
- St Kentigern's Church, Mungrisdale, Mungrisdale, Cumbria
- St Kentigern's Church, Castle Sowerby, Castle Sowerby, Cumbria
- Church of Most Holy Redeemer and St Kentigern, Melling, Merseyside

== See also ==
- Glasgow Cathedral, also known as St Kentigern's
