= St Mungo's Church, Bromfield =

Coordinates: 54.8114°N 3.2840°W

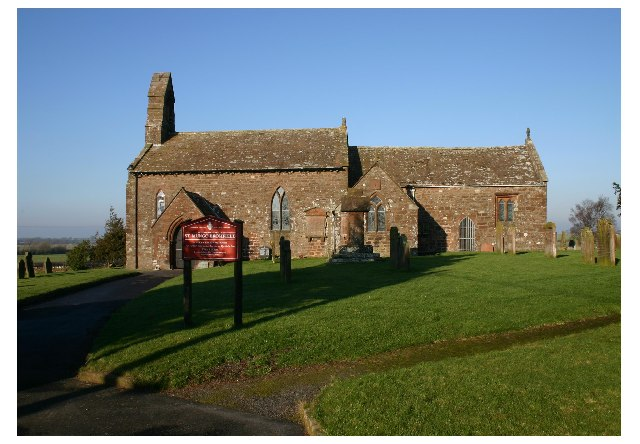
- St Mungo's Church, Bromfield, from the south

- Location in Cumbria
- OS grid reference: NY 175 470
- Location: Bromfield, Cumbria
- Country: England
- Denomination: Anglican

History
- Status: Parish church
- Dedication: Saint Mungo

Architecture
- Functional status: Active
- Heritage designation: Grade I
- Designated: 11 April 1967
- Architectural type: Church
- Style: Norman, Gothic

Specifications
- Materials: Sandstone rubble Sandstone slate roof

Administration
- Province: York
- Diocese: Carlisle
- Archdeaconry: West Cumberland
- Deanery: Solway
- Parish: Bromfield

Clergy
- Vicar: Revd David Tembey

St Mungo's Church is in the village of Bromfield, Cumbria, England. It is an active Anglican parish church in the deanery of Solway, the archdeaconry of West Cumberland and the diocese of Carlisle. The church is recorded in the National Heritage List for England as a designated Grade I listed building.

== History ==
The church dates from the 12th century with additions and alterations during the next two centuries. Restorations were carried out in 1861–62, 1893–94 and 1926.

The church is named for the 6th century Saint Mungo, or Kentigern.

== Architecture ==
=== Exterior ===
St Mungo's is constructed in red sandstone rubble with a sandstone slate roof. It has coped gables on which are cross finials. The plan consists of a two-bay nave with a north aisle, a south porch and a north vestry, and a two-bay chancel with side chapels and a lean-to hearse house. On the west gable is a twin bellcote and on the east gable is another bellcote for the angelus bell. In the porch is a re-set Norman doorway with zigzag carving. On the east wall of the nave on each side of the chancel arch are stretches of a Norman frieze decorated with saltaire crosses. The church originally had transepts, but due to extensions of the church, they now lie east of the chancel arch, the north transept having been absorbed in the aisle. The south chapel was originally a chantry, then walled off from the chancel, has been made into a memorial to the victims of the First World War, and is known as St George's chapel. The south chapel is the Crookdake Chapel and contains a graveslab to Adam Crookdake who died in 1304.

=== Interior ===
The font dates from the 12th century and is set on a hexagonal stem. In the south wall is a piscina and there are aumbries on each side of the altar. The pews, communion rail and altar screen date from the 19th century. The church contains an 18th-century Royal coat of arms, and on the walls are memorial plaques from the 18th and 19th centuries. Inside the porch are fragments of a medieval cross and graveslabs.

== External features ==
In the churchyard is the Bromfield War Memorial, which commemorates 14 local servicemen who died in the First World War and one lost in the Second World War. The memorial was originally unveiled on 17 May 1920 by Colonel Sir George Dixon, and dedicated by Archdeacon Campbell. The war memorial is Grade II listed.

To the north of the church is a holy well also dedicated to St Mungo. Over it is a circular sandstone wellhead with a conical stone cap dating from 1878; it is listed Grade II.

== See also ==
- Grade I listed churches in Cumbria
- Listed buildings in Bromfield, Cumbria
