= St Mungo's Parish Church =

Church in Clackmannanshire, Scotland

Coordinates: 56°06′49″N 3°47′50″W

St Mungo's Parish Church, Alloa
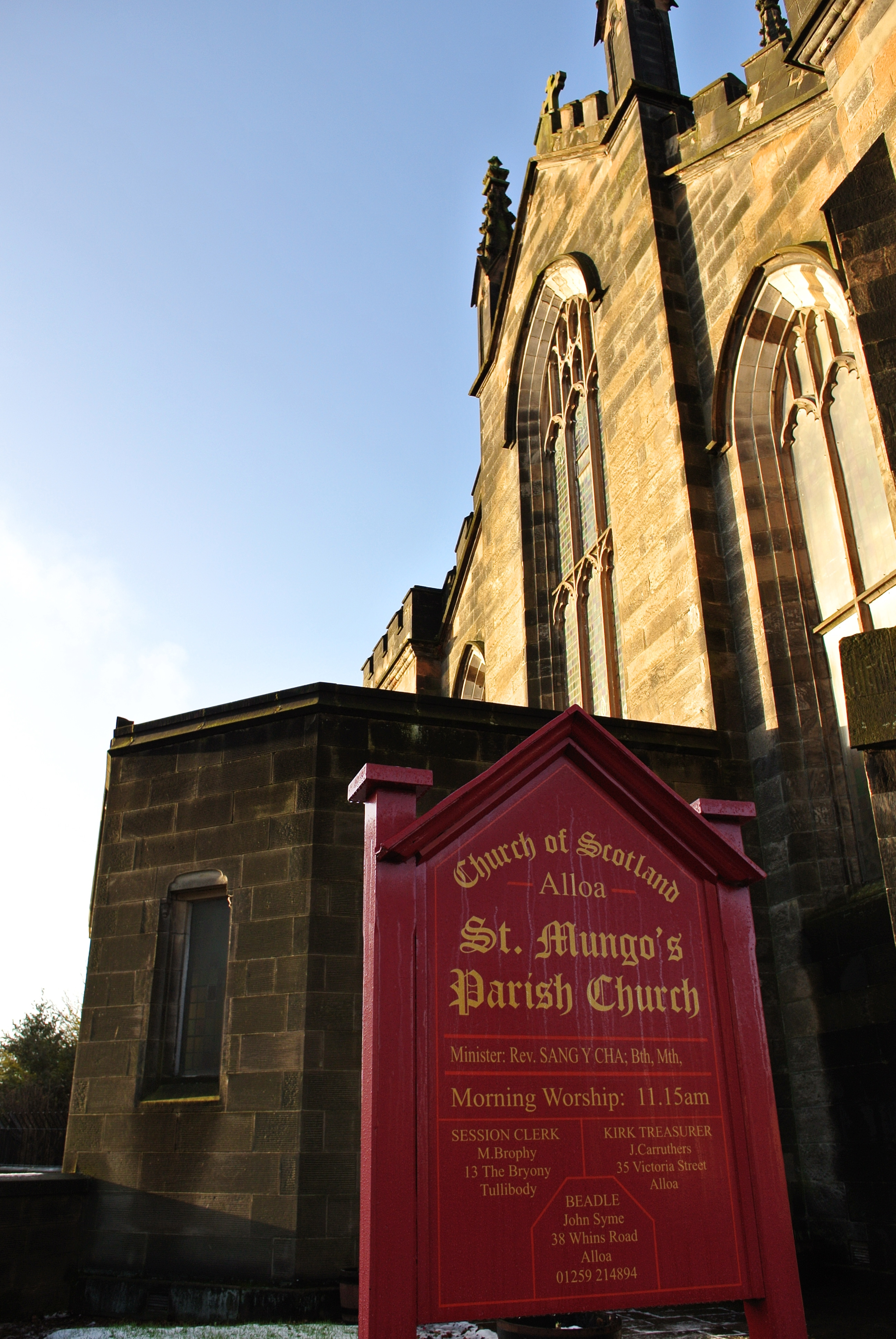
- St Mungo's Parish Church, Bedford Place, Alloa, Clackmannanshire
- St Mungo's Parish Church, Alloa
- Location: Alloa
- Denomination: Church of Scotland
- Website: http://www.stmungosparish.org.uk

History
- Dedication: Saint Mungo

Architecture
- Architect: James Gillespie Graham
- Style: Gothic with louth-spire
- Completed: 1819

Specifications
- Capacity: 700 (1561 when built)
- Length: 124ft (38 m)
- Width: 73ft (22 m)

The church is named after Saint Mungo (also known as Saint Kentigern), patron saint and founder of the city of Glasgow. It belongs to the Church of Scotland Presbytery of Stirling and serves the parish of Alloa. A chapel dedicated to St Mungo is thought to have been erected during the fourteenth or fifteenth-century, which became dependent upon the Parish of Tullibody. Alloa had grown into a parish in its own right by 1600 when the Act of Assembly united the two parishes. In 1680, the original chapel was rebuilt and enlarged. The current church replaces the old parish church from the seventeenth-century which had been deemed much too small for the congregation for over seventy years and was declared ruinous and unsafe in August 1815. The condition of the old church was so bad that services were often being held in the open air rather than risking injury to the congregation The decision was finally made to abandon the old building and find a site for a new parish church. The Erskine family donated land at Bedford Place and work on the new St Mungo's church began in 1817. The church congregation temporarily worshipped in the Tabernacle until the completion in 1819 of the new church. Since land was judged at the time to have too great a value to the living to be set aside for the dead, no graveyard was planned or added to the new church. The more elaborate scale and design of the new building was intended to reflect the increased size and prosperity of the nineteenth-century congregation. The church was one of the largest in Scotland at the time it was built.

== Building ==
The current church was designed by architect James Gillespie Graham. The building, in droved ashlar, is one of his finest neo-perpendicular Gothic hall kirks. It has a rectangular plan with low square towers at each angle and an advanced gable centred on the north front. A spectacular 207 ft (63 m) crocketed Gothic louth-spire tops the building, so called because it was based on a fifteenth-century design at Louth, Lincolnshire. The spire is centred on the south front and dramatically supported by corner turrets and flying buttresses. The tower is furnished with a four-dial clock and a finely toned bell, weighing about fourteen cwt.

John Smith of Alloa was awarded the building contract. Robert Cock, along with his four sons, carried out the original slate work. The paint work was completed by Thomas Whitehead. Miller and Drysdale installed the plumbing. The imitation oak ceiling and ornaments around the ventilators were the first work carried out by John Wardhope from Edinburgh. The Earl of Mar erected at his own expense the ornamental railing around the church. It was intended that the railing on the north side should be circular, however, due to objections to its planned projection being too far into the centre of the road it was kept parallel to the road.

The foundation stone was laid on 24 February 1817 and the church opened on 20 June 1819 with a capacity of 1561 seats. There were 200 fewer seats than originally planned due to space taken up by the choir and organ. It is thought that around 2500 people attended the church opening which was more than half of the population of the town – at that time, the population of Alloa would only have been around 4000. The first child to be baptised after opening was John Francis Erskine, son of Mr. Robert Hutton. To commemorate the occasion, the Earl of Mar presented Mr. Hutton with a silver cup bearing an inscription. It was 1825 before the bell and clock were added. In the late 1830s, records show that the church had 2698 members from 766 families.

The total cost of the building came to £7000. Lady Charlotte Erskine bequeathed £1200 towards the cost and the spire was built by public subscription. Lady Erskine's mortification deed specified that the sum should go towards an addition to the church of Alloa, keeping the new addition in good repair and provision of 246 seats. Sixty seats were reserved for paupers who could not afford to pay and the remainder were to be let at a moderate yearly rent. The cost of the new building was kept down by re-employing much of the stonework of the old church, leaving its western gable and bell-tower to stand alone.

Only two years after opening for worship, dry rot was already spreading rapidly throughout the interior of the church. The architect recommended that the space under the seats be filled with gravel and broken stone as well as paving the whole of the ground floor. This was carried out in 1824 except in the middle section of the church which was not infected. Further expensive schemes of interior improvement were carried out in 1895 and 1923 with little success since they left the existing interior largely unaltered. The church was noted as "lacking few pretensions to beauty", but this likely refers to the relatively restrained design of the early nineteenth century.

In early 1870 the congregation disputed the settlement by the Crown of Rev. Angus Gunn of Dollar to the United Parishes of Alloa and Tullibody. Gunn withdrew and instead, the 33-year-old Rev. Alexander Bryson was appointed in June 1870.

In 1931, a legacy of £1000 was bequeathed to the church and, in recognition of the need for more modern and comfortable seating, the Kirk Session decided upon major reconstruction of the church interior. It was 1934 before the Session instructed architect Leslie Grahame Thomson MacDougall to prepare plans for the reconstruction, which were duly presented to the congregation at an estimated cost of around £13,000 and subsequently approved. The Baird Trustees generously promised £1200 towards the cost and a Church Interior Reconstruction Fund was established. Lady collectors visited homes month by month to collect money for the fund. Within two years, sufficient funds were raised from the monthly collections to allow the work to begin on 6 December 1936 and the church reopened on 16 October 1937.

During the first phase of the reconstruction, the galleries were removed and the interior of the church was significantly brightened. A new entrance porch took the place of the old vestibule and allowed additional seating. The roof was found to be in serious disrepair and was entirely reconditioned with the plaster ceiling replaced by a panelled and embossed wooden design. The floor was also replaced and a new heating system installed along with pendant lanterns. Records show that a new pulpit, font and lectern were also gifted and installed during this first phase of the reconstruction. At the same time, a Minister's chair and an acousticon earphone installation were also gifted. A second phase of reconstruction was planned which was to include a new chancel, vestries and session house. However, it was not until 1967 that the alterations to the chancel and other improvements, including the addition of a choir room and session house, were undertaken to the same architect's plans.

The current church has several stained glass windows that were installed as memorials. The Good Shepherd window (1896) is dedicated to William Duncan Bruce and his wife. The Tie Deum window (1901) is dedicated to Alexander Bryson, former minister of the church (1870–1900) and the Gethsemane window (1910) is dedicated to the wife of James Brown. In 1991, a memorial window (Fisher of Men) was installed and dedicated to Peter Phillip Brodie, former minister of the church (1947–1986) and Moderator of the General Assembly of the Church of Scotland (1978–1979).

In 1972, the church was designated as a Category B listed building.

== List of ministers (new and old parish church) ==
- 2011–present: Sang Y. Cha BTH MTH, News article: BBC 'Hollywood to Alloa for Kirk minister Sang Cha' (2011)
- 1994–2011: Alan F.M. Downie MA BD, Obituary: Johnston Press (2010)
- 1986–1994: Keith Ferrier Hall BD
- 1947–1986: Peter Philip Brodie MA BD LLB DD, also Moderator of the General Assembly of the Church of Scotland, 1978–1979,News article: Glasgow Herald 'Dr. Brodie to be next Moderator' (1977)
- 1929–1946: James Pitt Watson DD, also Moderator of the General Assembly of the Church of Scotland, 1953–1954, News article: Glasgow Herald 'Alloa Minister in Motor Accident' (1931), Obituary: Glasgow Herald (1962)
- 1927–1929: Alexander Macdonald DD, also Moderator of the General Assembly of the Church of Scotland, 1948, News article: Glasgow Herald 'Moderator's Plea at Rally' (1948), News article: London Gazette 'The Procession of Her Majesty The Queen' (1953)
- 1919–1927: Robert John Thomson MA BD
- 1911–1919: Augustine Waitworth Scudamore Forbes MA BD
- 1901–1911: Lauchlan Maclean Watt MA BD DD also Moderator of the General Assembly of the Church of Scotland, 1933–1934, Obituary: Newburgh News (1957), Publications: List of books and poetry
- 1870–1900: Alexander Bryson, News article: Edinburgh Gazette 'Whitehall' (1870)
- 1863–1869: William Shaw MA, News article: Edinburgh Gazette 'Whitehall' (1862)
- 1828–1862: Peter Brotherston DD, News article: Edinburgh Gazette 'Whitehall' (1828)
- 1803–1828: James Maxton, Obituary (The Gentleman's Magazine), 1828
- 1760–1803: James Frame MA, Graduate Record: University of Glasgow (1746)
- 1753–1760: James Fordyce DD, Graduate record: University of Glasgow (1760), Publications: List of sermons including Sermons to Young Women which is mentioned in Pride and Prejudice by Jane Austen (Mr Collins attempts to read the book aloud to the women during a visit to the Bennet household)
- 1750–1753: James Syme MA
- 1736–1749: James Gordon MA also Moderator of the General Assembly of the Church of Scotland, 1734
- 1726–1735: John Taylor MA
- 1704–1724: John Logan
- 1690–1699: George Turnbull, also son of George Turnbull, Philosopher and Theologian
- 1664–1689: James Wright MA
- 1626–1664: John Craigengelt MA
- 1589–1624: James Duncanson MA, Publication: Letter to King James (1604)

== Gallery ==
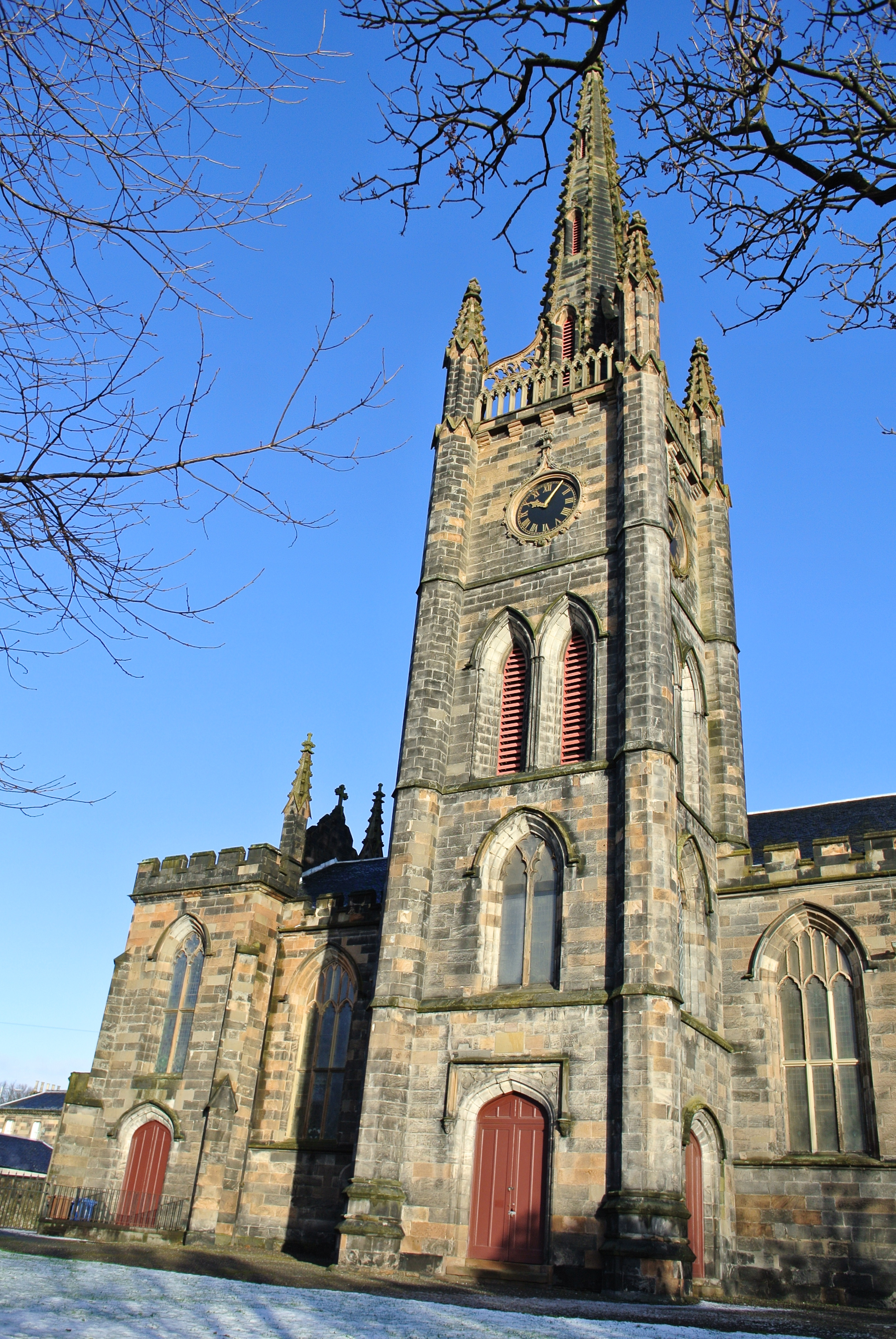
St Mungo's Parish Church, Alloa

== Other images and maps relating to the church ==
- 2011: Aerial photograph showing St Mungo's Parish Church, Royal Commission on the Ancient and Historical Monuments of Scotland (RCAHMS)
- 2011: Aerial photograph showing the old church, Royal Commission on the Ancient and Historical Monuments of Scotland (RCAHMS)
- 2011: Aerial photograph showing the old church, Royal Commission on the Ancient and Historical Monuments of Scotland (RCAHMS)
- 2009: Photograph of St Mungo's Parish Church, Google Maps (Street View)
- 2009: Photograph of St Mungo's Parish Church, Google Maps (Street View)
- 1990: Painting of the old church ruins, BBC & Public Catalog Foundation
- 1949: Aerial photograph showing St Mungo's Parish Church, Britain from Above
- 1928: Aerofilm showing St Mungo's Parish Church, Royal Commission on the Ancient and Historical Monuments of Scotland (RCAHMS)
- 1896: Postcard of St Mungo's Parish Church, University of St Andrews Library Photographic Archive
- 1861: Town plan of Alloa showing the church and number of seats (1561), National Library of Scotland
- 1840: Painting of Alloa including St Mungo's Parish Church, Clackmannanshire Council
- 1825: Map of Alloa showing St Mungo's Parish Church and the name of the minister, National Library of Scotland
- 1820: Ink sketch of the old church and planned new church, Royal Commission on the Ancient and Historical Monuments of Scotland (RCAHMS)
