= Coat of arms of Glasgow =

- Armiger: Glasgow City Council
- Adopted: 1996 (current version)
- Crest: The half-length figure of Saint Kentigern affrontee vested and mitred, his right hand raised in the act of benediction, and having in his left hand a crosier, all Proper.
- Shield: Argent, on a mount in base Vert an oak tree Proper, the stem at the base thereof surmounted by a salmon on its back also Proper, with a signet ring in its mouth Or; on the top of the tree a redbreast, and in sinister fess point an ancient hand bell, both also Proper.
- Supporters: Two salmon Proper, each holding in its mouth a signet ring Or
- Motto: Let Glasgow Flourish
- Earlier version
- Use: 1866

The coat of arms of Glasgow is the coat of arms belonging to Glasgow City Council, the local authority of Glasgow, Scotland. The coat of arms was first granted by the Lord Lyon King of Arms in 1866, and re-granted to the current city council in 1996. The design references several legends associated with Saint Mungo, the patron saint of Glasgow.

== History ==
Banner of the arms, which serves as the city flag

The Lord Lyon first granted a patent for a coat of arms for the city of Glasgow in 1866. Before this time, there were at least three official coats of arms in use.

The first seal to use all the elements associated with the coat of arms was that of the Chapter of Glasgow, in use from 1488–1540, but they did not appear in something close to their present combination until 1647.

Since it was first granted, various versions of the symbol have been in use. The current version of the coat of arms dates from April 1996, when it was granted following a local authority reshuffle.

== Symbolism ==
The symbols appearing on the coat of arms represents the life and legends of Saint Mungo, the patron saint of Glasgow, and are often remembered by the following poem:

Here is the tree that never grew
Here is the bird that never flew
Here is the fish that never swam
Here is the bell that never rang

The tree referred to in this poem is depicted as an oak tree in the coat of arms, but popular versions of the story refer to a hazel branch. The story goes that he was once left in charge of watching a holy fire by Saint Serf, but the fire was put out by some other boys jealous of St. Mungo after he fell asleep. Upon awakening, St. Mungo was able to miraculously light a new fire from the tree branch.

The bird referred to in the poem is a robin which was tamed by St. Mungo's teacher, St. Serf which was revived by St. Mungo after it was killed by some of his classmates.

Three fish are depicted in the coat of arms, each with a ring in its mouth. This references the story St. Mungo being able to retrieve a lost golden ring belonging to Queen Languoreth of Strathclyde from the mouth of a fish fished from the River Clyde.

The bell is an item which may have been given to St. Mungo by the Pope, but this is not known for sure. In any case St. Mungo's bell was a notable institution in Glasgow. The bell no longer exists, with a replacement having been purchased in 1641.

St. Mungo himself also appears on the coat of arms as the crest above the imagery described above, with his hand raised as if to give a benediction.

== Motto on the Glasgow coat of arms ==
The motto depicted on the coat of arms is "Let Glasgow Flourish". The motto was registered at the Court of the Lord Lyon in 1866, and is a shortened version of the phrase "Lord, let Glasgow flourish through the preaching of thy word and praising thy name". St. Mungo is said to have said this within one of his sermons.
