= Blencogo =

Village in Cumbria, England

Coordinates: 54.819°N 3.252°W

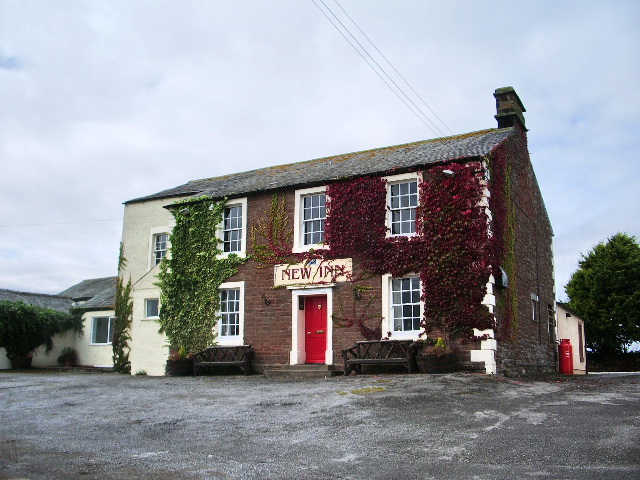
- The New Inn public house, Blencogo

- Location in Allerdale, Cumbria Location within Cumbria
- OS grid reference: NY195478
- Civil parish: Bromfield
- Unitary authority: Cumberland
- Ceremonial county: Cumbria
- Region: North West
- Country: England
- Sovereign state: United Kingdom
- Post town: WIGTON
- Postcode district: CA7
- Dialling code: 01697
- Police: Cumbria
- Fire: Cumbria
- Ambulance: North West
- UK Parliament: Penrith and Solway

Blencogo is a small farming village and former civil parish, now in the parish of Bromfield, in the Cumberland district, in the ceremonial county of Cumbria, England. It is situated near Wigton, on the Solway Plain, off the B3502 Wigton to Silloth road. The village is a centre for growing osier willow for basketmaking and related crafts. In 1931 the parish had a population of 139.

== Toponymy ==
Armstrong, et al. cite Ekwall, who "derives this name from Welsh 'blaen' 'top'...and 'cog' 'cuckoo' to which was later added ON 'haugr' 'hill' ". However, they say that it is more probable that the final element "is the British plural inflexion (Welsh '-au', Cornish '-ow', Breton '-ou')." So, ' hill of the cuckoo or cuckoos'.('ON' is Old Norse; 'British' is Common Brittonic).

== History ==
Blencogo first appears in literature around 1100 CE when the Lord Waltheof of Allerdale gives the barony of Blencogo to Odard de Logis. Numerous land transfers are made to Holme Cultram Abbey in over the next 150 years. Land transfers and grants for Blencogo also appear in the patent and charter rolls for Edward III (1342), Richard II (1388), Henry IV (1399), Henry VI (1426), Edward IV (1474), and Henry VII (1543).

Blencogo was formerly a township in Bromfield parish, from 1866 Blencogo was a civil parish in its own right until it was abolished on 1 April 1934 and merged with Bromfield.

== Notable residents ==
- Jonathan Boucher (1738-1804), born here

== See also ==
- Listed buildings in Bromfield, Cumbria
- List of places in Cumbria
