= Mines Advisory Group =

Non-governmental organization

- Type: Non-Governmental Organisation
- Industry: Landmine relief
- Founded: 1989
- Headquarters: Manchester, United Kingdom
- Area served: Global
- Key people: Rae McGrath (Founder); Darren Cormack (Chief Executive); Shari Bryan (Executive Director, US MAG); Rosamund Pike (Ambassador)
- Revenue: 99,273,000 pounds (2024)
- Number of employees: 6,000 (2023)
- Website: maginternational.org

The Mines Advisory Group (MAG) is a non-governmental organization that assists people affected by landmines, unexploded ordnance, and small arms and light weapons.

MAG takes a humanitarian approach to landmine action. They focus on the impact of their work on local communities. This approach recognises that although the number of landmines in an area may be small, the effect on a community can be crippling. Targets are therefore determined locally, in response to liaison with affected communities, and local authorities.

MAG field operations are managed and implemented by nationals of the affected countries, with MAG expatriate staff taking a monitoring and training role. MAG provides work for many members of affected communities, with families of landmine victims taking an active role.

MAG is based in Manchester, United Kingdom, and has a sister organisation, MAG US in Washington, D.C., United States. Since 1989, MAG has helped more than 20 million people in 70 countries rebuild their lives and livelihoods after conflict. As part of the International Campaign to Ban Landmines, MAG was co-laureate of the 1997 Nobel Peace Prize. In 2020, MAG reported destroying 115,627 landmines and unexploded bombs and releasing a total of 60,742,650 square meters (23.5 square miles) of land.

== History ==
MAG was formed in 1989 by Rae McGrath in response to landmines and unexploded ordnances (UXO) left by the Soviet–Afghan War. The organisation initially served as an advisory group, publishing reports about the problems in Afghanistan and Cambodia based on their assessments between 1989 and 1991. In 1992, MAG, along with other NGOs, formed the International Campaign to Ban Landmines (ICBL).

By 1992, MAG began its first landmine clearance program in Iraq. Clearance programmes extended to Angola, Cambodia, and Laos by 1994. MAG continued to expand, providing services related to training and employment, emergency response, and risk education.

MAG has worked in 70 countries since 1989, destroying landmines and providing further support to communities recovering from war. MAG states 29 countries have been cleared of landmines while 63 remain contaminated.

Rosamund Pike has served as the MAG Ambassador since 2021. Princess Diana and Prince Harry have supported the organization's efforts.

Major donors for projects include numerous national governments, foundations, and the UNDP.

== Operations ==
MAG uses a variety of techniques to detect and destroy unexploded ordnances (UXOs) including manual deminers, mine detection dogs, metal detectors, excavation tools, and armoured machines. MAG works with and trains local communities to clear landmines.

MAG also engaged in policy and advocacy work at the United Nations and in many countries. It also works to mitigate arms trafficking and provides risk education to local communities.

== Current operation locations ==
=== Africa ===
MAG currently works in Angola, Burkina Faso, Chad, Guinea, Mali, Mauritania, Niger, Nigeria, Sierra Leone, South Sudan, and Zimbabwe.

=== Asia ===
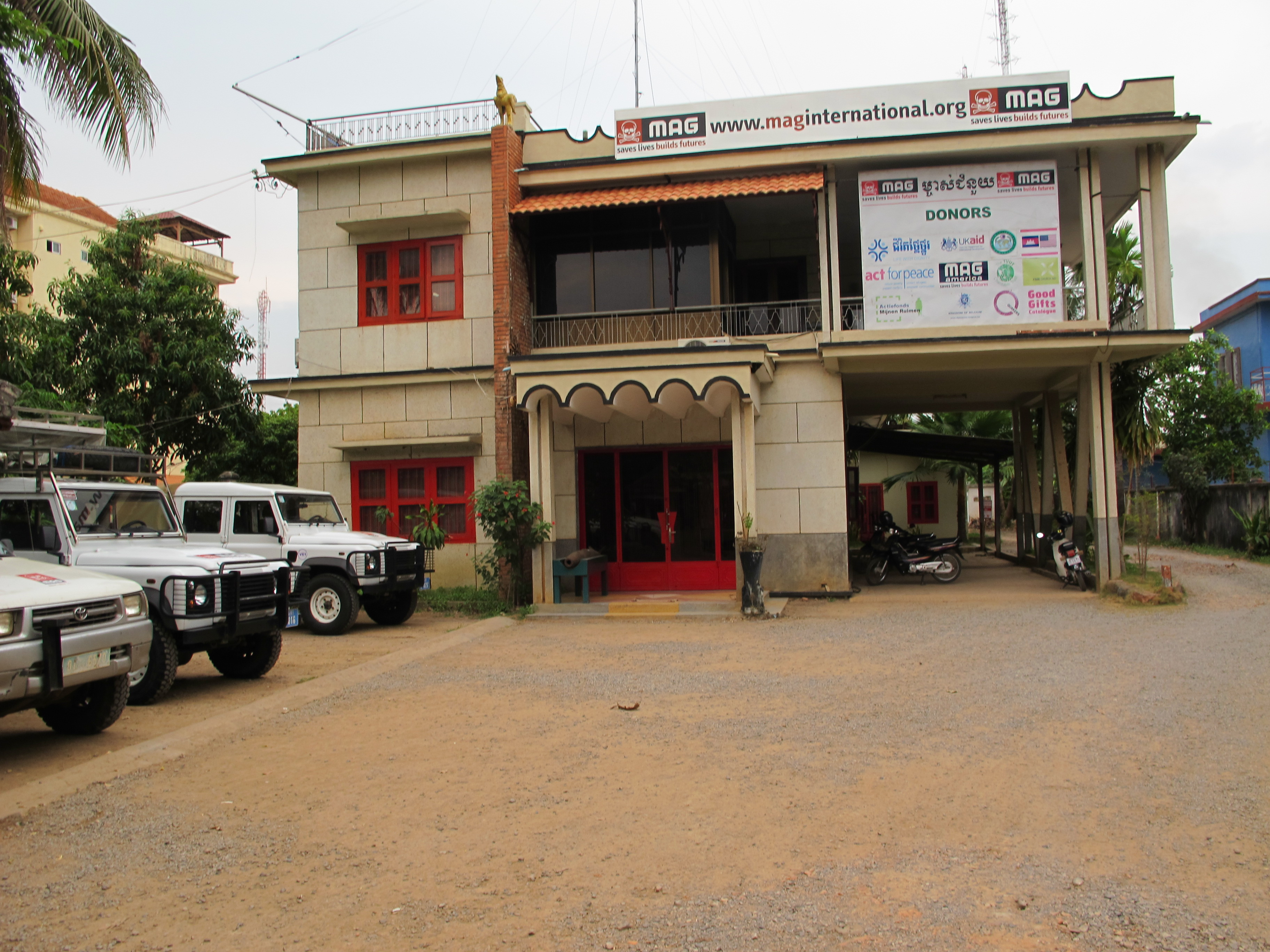
The office of MAG in Battambang

MAG currently works in Cambodia, Laos, Myanmar, Sri Lanka, and Vietnam.

=== Europe ===
MAG currently works in Azerbaijan, Bosnia and Herzegovina, and Ukraine.

=== Latin America ===
MAG currently works in the Caribbean (including the Bahamas, Belize, Guyana, St. Lucia, Suriname, and Trinidad and Tobago), Ecuador, and Peru.

=== Middle East ===
MAG currently works in Iraq, Lebanon, and Syria. The organization is attempting to address the possible hundreds of thousands of UXO in Syria which killed more than 900 people from late 2024 to mid-2025.

== Past operations ==
MAG previously had programmes, needs assessments, and/or support projects in countries including: Afghanistan, Belarus, Botswana, Burundi, Colombia, Cyprus, Democratic Republic of the Congo, El Salvador, Eritrea, Ethiopia, Ghana, Honduras, Iran, Jordan, Kashmir, Kenya, Kosovo, Kyrgyzstan, Lesotho, Libya, Malawi, Mauritius, Mozambique, Namibia, Nepal, Nicaragua, Pakistan, Palau, Palestine, Papua New Guinea, Philippines, Rwanda, Senegal, Solomon Islands, Sudan, Swaziland, Taiwan, Tanzania, Thailand, Tunisia, Turkey, Uganda, and Zambia.
