= Listed buildings in Bromfield, Cumbria =

Bromfield is a civil parish in the Cumberland district in Cumbria, England. It contains 20 listed buildings that are recorded in the National Heritage List for England. Of these, one is listed at Grade I, the highest of the three grades, and the others are at Grade II, the lowest grade. The parish contains the villages of Bromfield, Langrigg and Blencogo and the surrounding countryside. Most of the listed buildings are houses and associated structures, or farmhouses and farm buildings. The other listed buildings include a church, two milestones, a former windmill converted into a house, a well head, a war memorial, and a school.

== Key ==
Grade	Criteria
I	Buildings of exceptional interest, sometimes considered to be internationally important
II	Buildings of national importance and special interest

== Buildings ==
Name and location	Photograph	Date	Notes	Grade
St Mungo's Church; 54.81138°N 3.28397°W		12th century	The church was altered in the following two centuries, and restored in the 19th and 20th centuries. It is in sandstone with sandstone slate roofs, and consists of a nave, a north aisle, a north vestry, a chancel with side-chapels, and a north hearse house attached to the church. On the west gable of the nave is a twin bellcote and on the east gable is a smaller bellcote for the angelus bell. The re-set south doorway is Norman, and inside the church are stretches of a Norman frieze.	I
Wall, Crookdake Hall; 54.78722°N 3.24996°W	—	14th or 15th century	The wall was formerly part of the hall, but is now detached. It is in sandstone, in ruins, and is about 3 metres (9.8 ft) high. The wall contains part of a window chamfer, a possible window seat, recesses for joists, and two corbel stones.	II
Crookdake Hall; 54.78738°N 3.24996°W	—	Late 16th or early 17th century	A farmhouse retaining 14th-century features, in particular a very thick wall. It is pebbledashed with a green slate roof, and has two storeys and five bays, with a two-storey stair wing at the rear giving an L-shaped plan. On the front is a two-storey gabled porch that has a doorway with a Tudor arch. The windows are sashes.	II
High Aikton Farmhouse and barns 54.78316°N 3.23221°W	—	1670s	The farmhouse and barns have green slate roofs. The house is roughcast with two storeys and four bays. On the front is a lean-to porch, and the windows are sashes. The barn to the right is in sandstone and has an L-shaped plan. It has a plank door with a dated lintel and ventilation slits on two levels. Inset into a side wall is a wheel-head Saxon cross.	II
Langrigg Hall; 54.80120°N 3.30148°W	—	Mid 18th century	A farmhouse that was extended in the early 19th century, it is stuccoed, on a chamfered plinth, with an eaves cornice, quoins, and a green slate roof with coped gables, The house has two storeys and five bays, with a lower two-storey single-bay extension to the right, and a two-storey bay window extension to the left. On the front is a gabled porch with a round-headed entrance, a hood mould, and a coat of arms. The windows are 19th-century casements with hood moulds on the ground floor. In the right wall is a re-set dated and inscribed lintel that was formerly on a dovecote.	II
Langfauld; 54.79973°N 3.29745°W	—	Late 18th century	A stuccoed farmhouse with a string course, angle pilasters, and a green slate roof. There are two storeys and five bays. The windows are casements with plain reveals.	II
Milestone, Langrigg; 54.79533°N 3.29711°W	—	Late 18th or early 19th century	The milestone was provided for the Wigton to Workington Turnpike road. It has a rounded top and is inscribed on the front with the distances in miles to Wigton and to Workington.	II
Milestone, High Scales; 54.79536°N 3.27251°W	—	Late 18th or early 19th century	The milestone was provided for the Wigton to Workington Turnpike road. It has a rounded top and is inscribed on the front with the distances in miles to Wigton and to Workington.	II
Blencogo Farmhouse and barn 54.82048°N 3.25168°W	—	Early 19th century	The farmhouse and attached barn have green slate roofs. The house is stuccoed on a chamfered plinth, with quoins, and it has two storeys and three bays. The windows are casements. The central doorway has pilasters, a blind fanlight, a frieze decorated with urns in relief, and a pediment. The barn is lower and to the right. It contains a re-set 17th-century doorway with a Tudor arched head, an inscribed lintel, and a hood mould. To the right are 20th-century windows and above are ventilation slits.	II
Blencogo House; 54.82172°N 3.24950°W	—	Early 19th century	The house is rendered, on a chamfered plinth, with an eaves cornice, quoins, and a green slate roof. It has two storeys and three bays, with a lower three-bay wing to the left. In the main part of the house the windows are sashes, and there is a central doorway that has a Tuscan doorcase with a fanlight and a pediment. In the wing, some of the windows are sashes, and others are casements.	II
Wall and gate piers, Blencogo House; 54.82155°N 3.24931°W	—	Early 19th century	The garden wall and gate piers are in sandstone and are partly roughcast. The walls are curved, forming quadrants, and have chamfered plinths and moulded coping. The gate piers are square and rusticated and have ball finials.	II
Langrigg House; 54.80008°N 3.30319°W	—	Early 19th century	A sandstone house with angle pilasters, an eaves cornice, and a green slate roof. It has two storeys and three bays, with a lower two-storey, single-bay wing to the right. On the front is a Tuscan doorcase and a doorway with a fanlight. The windows are sashes.	II
Prospect House; 54.79932°N 3.26258°W	—	Early 19th century	A sandstone house with an eaves cornice, quoins, and a green slate roof. It has two storeys and three bays, with a two-storey, single-bay wing on each side. The central doorway has an architrave with a pediment, and the windows are sashes.	II
Seymore House; 54.80540°N 3.25335°W	—	Early 19th century	A rendered farmhouse with Welsh slate roofs. It has two storeys and three bays, with a three-bay extension to the left. The doorway has pilasters and a pediment, and the windows are sashes.	II
Windmill; 54.79713°N 3.29393°W		Early 19th century	The windmill has been converted into a house. It is in sandstone with a domed wooden cap. The building consists of a tapering three-storey tower, and it contains 20th-century casement windows.	II
Gill House; 54.79871°N 3.27846°W	—	c. 1830	The house is stuccoed, on a chamfered plinth, and has a hipped green slate roof. There are two storeys and four bays, with a rear extension giving the house an L-shaped plan. On the front are French windows, canted bay windows, and sash windows. At the rear is a Gothic porch with columns and a frieze, and above it is a window with a pointed arch.	II
Barns, Crookdake Hall; 54.78761°N 3.24970°W	—	1840	There are four barns, the later ones dated 1893, forming an L-shaped plan. They are in sandstone with roofs of green and Welsh slate. They contain various openings, a dated keystone, a dated lintel, and two re-set inscribed lintels.	II
Blencogo School; 54.82258°N 3.24606°W		1854	The school is in sandstone with steep slate roofs, coped gables, and tall chimneys. It has one storey and three bays. In the right bay is a gabled porch with ornate cast fittings. The central bay has a larger gable and contains a four-light window. Attached to the left bay is a gabled porch with an entrance at the rear. On the right gable end is an open bellcote.	II
St Mungo's Well; 54.81223°N 3.28358°W	—	1878	This consists of a well head over a medieval well in sandstone with iron clamps. It is circular with a side door and a comical cap, and carries an inscription.	II
War memorial 54.81104°N 3.28380°W	—	1920	The war memorial is in the churchyard of St Mungo's Church. It is in Creetown granite, and consists of a wheel-head cross on a shaft with a sloped foot, on a plinth. On the head of the cross and the upper part of the shaft are knotwork carvings, and on the plinth is an inscription and the names of those lost in the First World War.	II
