= John Cameron, Lord Coulsfield =

Scottish judge (1934–2016)

The Right Honourable Lord Coulsfield

Senator of the College of Justice
- In office 1987–2002
- Monarch: Elizabeth II
- Succeeded by: Lord Brodie

Personal details
- Born: John Taylor Cameron; 24 April 1934
- Died: 28 February 2016 (aged 81)
- Education: Corpus Christi College; University of Edinburgh
- Profession: Advocate

John Taylor Cameron, Lord Coulsfield, PC (24 April 1934 – 28 February 2016) was a Scottish judge who served as a Senator of the College of Justice from 1987 to 2002.

== Biography ==
Cameron was born on 24 April 1934 in Dundee. His father was John Reid Cameron, director of education for Dundee Council and his mother was Annie Duncan, a teacher.

Cameron was educated at Fettes College in Edinburgh, before getting an open scholarship to study at Corpus Christi College, Oxford where he studied classics. When he failed the entrance examination for the civil service, he attended University of Edinburgh where he studied for an LLB.

He was admitted to the Faculty of Advocates in 1960, and lectured in public law at the University of Edinburgh from 1960 to 1964. He was appointed Queen's Counsel (QC) in 1973, and served as an Advocate Depute from 1977 to 1979. He was Chairman of the Medical Appeals Tribunal for Scotland from 1985 to 1987.

He was appointed as a Senator of the College of Justice in 1987, taking the judicial title Lord Coulsfield. He was the Scottish Judge on the Employment Appeal Tribunal from 1992 to 1996. Before joining the Court of Session he was a judge in the Courts of Appeal of Jersey and Guernsey. In 2000, he was one of the four judges at the Pan Am Flight 103 bombing trial.

Cameron retired from practicing law in 2002. He served as Editor of the Scottish Law and Practice Quarterly and chair of the committee for legal education in Scotland. He died on 28 February 2016 at the age of 81 after a short illness.
