= Philip Brodie, Lord Brodie =

Scottish lawyer (born 1950)

The Right Honourable Lord Brodie PC

Senator of the College of Justice
- In office 2002–2020
- Nominated by: Jack McConnell; As First Minister
- Monarch: Elizabeth II
- Preceded by: Lord Coulsfield

Personal details
- Born: Philip Hope Brodie; 14 July 1950 (age 76)
- Spouse: Carol Dora McLeish
- Education: University of Edinburgh
- Profession: Advocate

Philip Hope Brodie, Lord Brodie, PC (born 14 July 1950) is a Scottish lawyer and one of the Senators of the College of Justice, a Judge of Scotland's Supreme Courts.

== Early life ==
He was born on 14 July 1950, the son of the late Very Rev Dr Peter Brodie, former minister at St Mungo's Parish Church, Alloa, and Moderator of the General Assembly of the Church of Scotland in 1978-79, and his wife, Constance Lindsay Hope.

Brodie grew up in Alloa, Clackmannanshire and was educated at Dollar Academy in Clackmannanshire, and studied at the School of Law of the University of Edinburgh (LL.B.) and the School of Law of the University of Virginia in the United States (LL.M.). He was admitted to the Faculty of Advocates in 1976, taking silk in 1987.

== Legal career ==
Brodie served as Standing Junior Counsel, a legal advisor to a government department, to the Ministry of Defence (Procurement) and to the Health and Safety Executive from 1983 to 1987, and was called to the English Bar (Lincoln's Inn) in 1991. From 1985 to 1996, he was a part-time member of the Mental Welfare Commission for Scotland. He was part-time Chairman of Industrial Tribunals from 1987 to 1991, and then part-time Chairman of Medical Appeal Tribunals from 1991 to 1996. From 1997 to 1999, he served as an Advocate Depute, representing the Crown in prosecutions in the High Court. In 2002, he was appointed part-time Chairman of Employment Tribunals, and later that year was appointed to the Bench, replacing Lord Coulsfield. In 2013 he was appointed as Convener of the Appeals Committee of the Commission of Assembly of the Church of Scotland.

== Personal life ==
In 1983, Lord Brodie married Carol Dora McLeish, with whom he has two sons and a daughter. His recreations include fencing, walking and reading. He was Chairman of the Cockburn Association, Edinburgh's influential conservationist organisation, from 2008 to 2016.

== See also ==
- List of Senators of the College of Justice
