= John R. Gray (minister) =

Scottish minister

The Very Reverend John R. Gray VRD
- Moderator of the General Assembly
- Church: Church of Scotland
- In office: 1977 to 1978
- Predecessor: Thomas F. Torrance
- Successor: Peter Brodie
- Other post: Minister of Dunblane Cathedral (1966–1984)

Personal details
- Born: John Rodger Gray; 9 January 1913 Coatbridge, Lanarkshire, Scotland
- Died: 9 August 1984 (aged 71)
- Denomination: Presbyterianism
- Education: High School of Glasgow
- Alma mater: University of Glasgow; Yale University; Princeton University

John Rodger Gray, VRD (9 January 1913 – 9 August 1984) was a Scottish minister serving in Dunblane Cathedral who was Moderator of the General Assembly of the Church of Scotland in 1977.

== Life ==
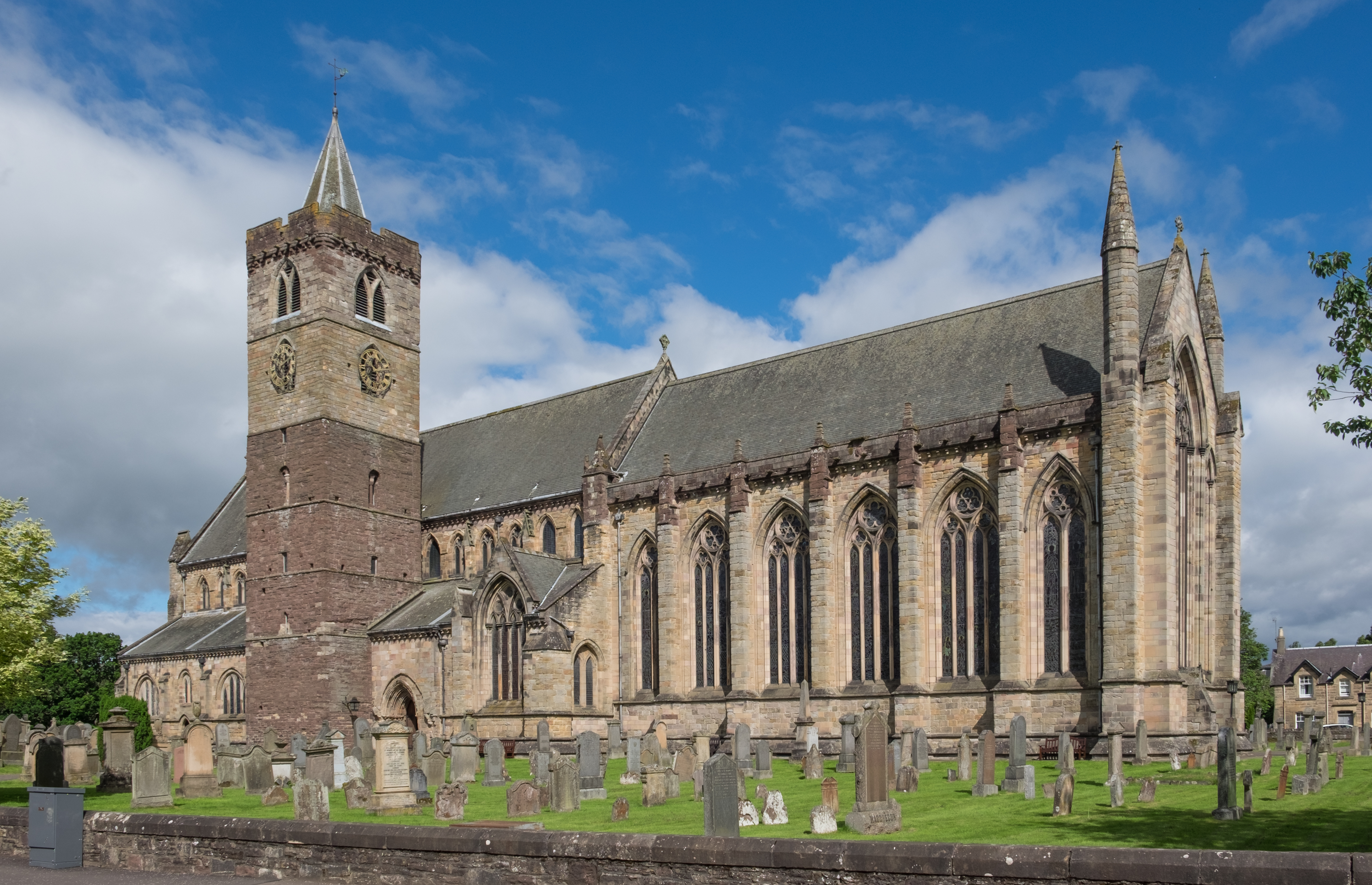
Dunblane Cathedral

He was born on 9 January 1913 in Coatbridge, Lanarkshire, Scotland. He was educated locally before going to High School of Glasgow, a private school in Glasgow. He studied economics at Glasgow University graduating in 1934. He then studied Divinity for three years, before doing further postgraduate study under a Commonwealth Fellowship at both Yale University and Princeton University in the United States. He graduated from Yale with a Bachelor of Divinity (BD) in 1938 and from Princeton with a Master of Theology (ThM) degree in 1939.

Returning to Britain in the Second World War, he was assistant minister of Barony Church, Glasgow, between 1939 and 1941. He then served as a chaplain in the Royal Navy from 1941 to 1946. After the war, he became minister of St. Stephen's Buccleuch in Glasgow. In 1960, the church merged with St Matthew's Blythswood. He continued his military service as a chaplain in the Royal Naval Volunteer Reserve from 1946 to 1963, and was awarded the Decoration for Officers of the Royal Naval Volunteer Reserve (VRD) in 1953.

In 1966 he was called to Dunblane Cathedral in Central Scotland. He was select preacher at the University of Oxford in 1977. He additionally served as Moderator of the General Assembly of the Church of Scotland from 1977 to 1978. After eighteen years as minister of Dunblane Cathedral, he retired in April 1984. He died later that year, on 9 August 1984.

== Family ==
In 1952 he was married to Dr Sheila Mary Gray (1928-2013) a doctor. She was author of "Annus Mirabilis, Memories of a Moderator's Wife".

Their three sons are the MP James Gray, the diplomat Charles Gray and Lt Cdr David Gray Royal Navy

== Publications ==
- Something to say to the Congregation : The Sermons of the Rev John R. Gray 1961-1983
