= Langrigg Hall =

Coordinates: 54.8014°N 3.3014°W

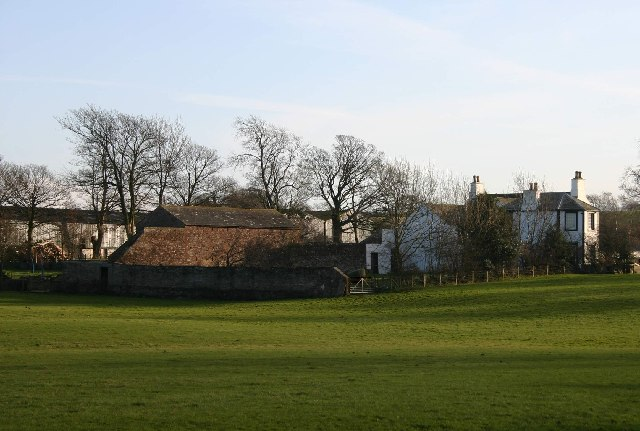
Langrigg Hall

Langrigg Hall is a country house near the village of Langrigg in Cumbria. It is a Grade II listed building.

== History ==
The hall was reconstructed by Thomas Bawis in the mid-18th century. John Barwis (1775–1818), who was also Rector of Niton in the Isle of Wight, was one of its prominent owners, and his son William Barwis, was still in possession of Langrigg manor in 1860. In 1876, its ownership changed to Joseph Bowerbank of Cockermouth. The hall is currently the base for a large free range egg production enterprise.
