= Peter Brodie (minister) =

Scottish minister

The Very Reverend Dr Peter Philip Brodie MA BD LLB DD (22 October 1916 – 16 October 1996) was a Church of Scotland minister, most notably Moderator of the General Assembly of the Church of Scotland from 1978 to 1979.

== Life ==
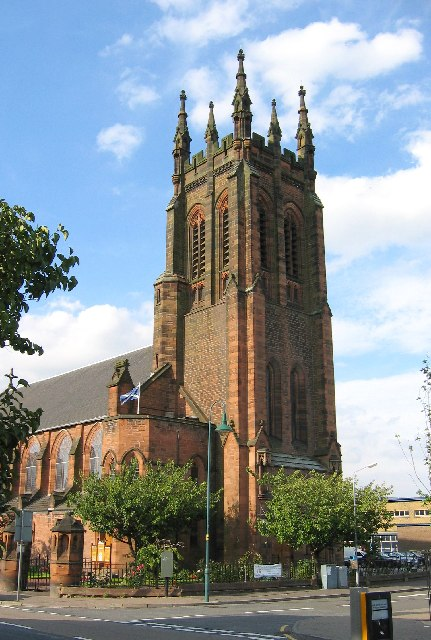
St Marys Kirkintilloch

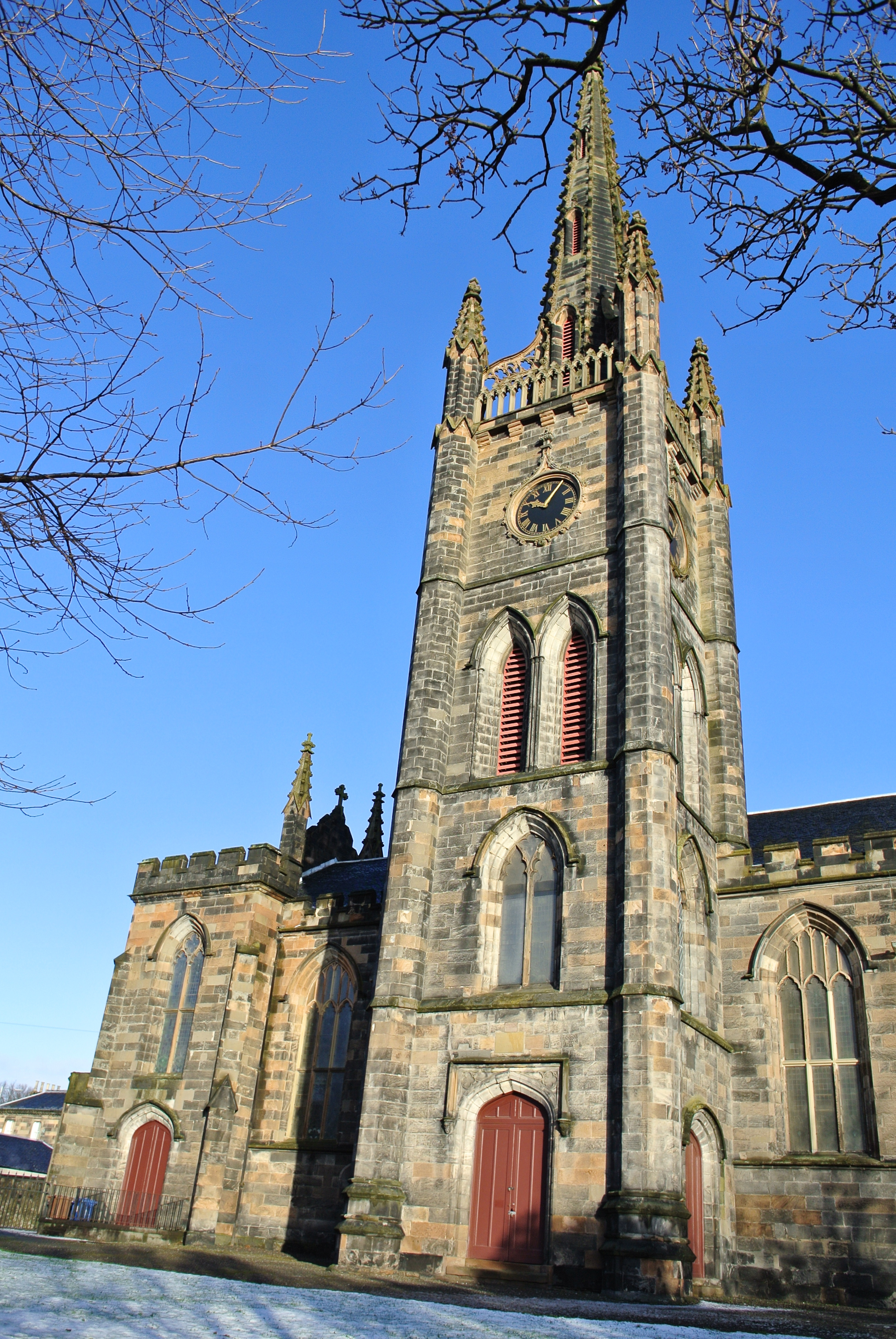
St Mungo's in Alloa

He was born in Airdrie on 22 October 1916 the son of Robert and Margaret Brodie.

He was educated at Airdrie Academy; Glasgow University and Trinity College, Glasgow.

In 1940 he began as assistant to Rev Morrison at St Mary's Church in Kirkintilloch. Following the death of Rev Morrison in 1941 he became minister, and served as such from 1942 to 1947. In the war he served in the Home Guard.

In 1947 he was transferred to St Mungo's Church in Alloa and ministered there until 1987. He lived the rest of his life in Victoria Square, Stirling.

In 1978 he succeeded Very Rev John Rodger Gray as Moderator of the General Assembly, the highest position within the Church of Scotland. He was succeeded in turn in 1979 by Very Rev Robert Barbour.

== Family ==
He was married to Constance Lindsay Hope.

They were parents to Philip Brodie, Lord Brodie (b.1950).

His son, Jonathan Brodie KC, became the Procurator of the General Assembly of the Church of Scotland on 1 June 2023. He had first attended the General Assembly in 1978 when his father, Peter Brodie, was Moderator.
