= St Kentigern's Church, Lanark (Hyndford Road) =

St Kentigern's Church
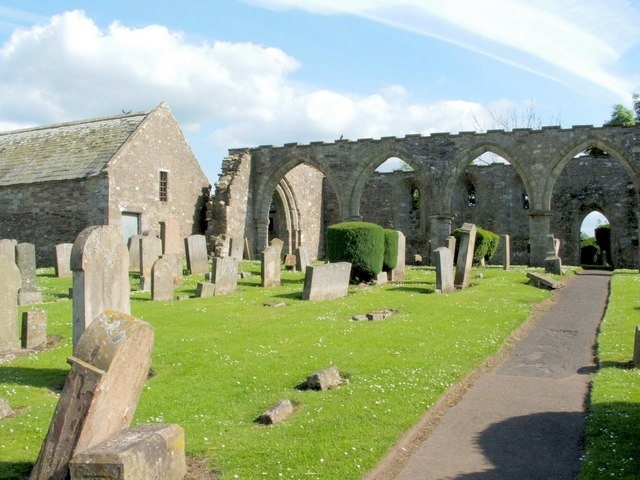
- The ruins of the church, as seen from the entrance to the cemetery. (2005)

- Location within South Lanarkshire
- 55°40′12.1″N 3°46′10.5″W
- Type: Church
- Location: Hyndford Road; Lanark, South Lanarkshire; United Kingdom

Scheduled monument
- Official name: St Kentigern's Church, Lanark
- Designated: 28 April 1920
- Reference no.: SM1144

Listed Building – Category B
- Official name: Churchyard and burial aisles at St Kentigern’s Church, excluding scheduled monument SM1144, Lanark
- Designated: 7 May 1980
- Reference no.: LB37028

St Kentigern's Church is a scheduled monument in Lanark, South Lanarkshire. Its churchyard and burial aisles are a category B listed building. It was previously the parish church of the town.

It is believed that the church was founded by St Kentigern himself shortly before his death in 603 AD. There is documentary evidence of its existence, however, dating back to 1150 AD when King David I granted it to the monastery of Dryburgh. Pope Gregory VIII took the church into his own protection in 1228.

The church, which was once attended by William Wallace, is now in a state of disrepair, despite having had repair work completed recently.
