= Listed buildings in Castle Sowerby =

Castle Sowerby is a civil parish in Westmorland and Furness, Cumbria, England. It contains 20 buildings that are recorded in the National Heritage List for England. Of these, one is listed at Grade I, the highest of the three grades, two are at Grade II*, the middle grade, and the others are at Grade II, the lowest grade. The parish is almost entirely rural, and most of the listed buildings are houses, farmhouses, and farm buildings scattered around the parish. The other listed buildings are a church and a bridge.

== Key ==
| Grade | Criteria |
|---|---|
| I | Buildings of exceptional interest, sometimes considered to be internationally important |
| II* | Particularly important buildings of more than special interest |
| II | Buildings of national importance and special interest |

== Buildings ==
| Name and location | Photograph | Date | Notes | Grade |
|---|---|---|---|---|
| St Kentigern's Church; 54.71645°N 2.96392°W | | 12th century | The church was altered during the following centuries, and was restored in 1821 and in 1888, the last restoration by C. J. Ferguson. It is in stone, and has a green slate roof with coped gables and a cross finial. The church consists of a nave, a south aisle with a south porch, and a chancel. On the west gable is a twin open bellcote. | II* |
| Thistlewood Farmhouse; 54.78403°N 2.94083°W | — | Early 15th century (probable) | Originally a fortified tower house, it was extended in the late 17th century, and is built in sandstone. The tower has quoins, a slate roof, two storeys and a basement. The extension is on a chamfered plinth, and has quoins, an eaves cornice, and a roof of Welsh slate and sandstone. It is lower than the tower, and has two storeys, four bays, a doorway with a chamfered surround, and mullioned windows with hood moulds. | I |
| The Ashes; 54.77560°N 2.94725°W | — | Mid 16th century | A house that was later extended, it is rendered on a square plinth, and has a green slate roof with coped gables. There are two storeys and five bays, with a lower single-bay extension to the left, and a rear outshut. In the centre is a door with a chamfered stone surround. The windows are mullioned with two or three lights, in the ground floor they have rounded heads and hood moulds, and in the upper floor is a continuous hood mould. The interior contains important wall paintings dating from the Tudor era. | II* |
| Former bastle house, How Hill; 54.71565°N 2.94653°W | — | Late 16th to early 17th century | The bastle house was remodelled and converted into a farmhouse in the 18th century. It is in stone with thick walls, partly rendered, with quoins, and a Westmorland slate roof. There are two storeys, the windows openings are splayed, and some former openings have been blocked. | II |
| Sowerby Hall; 54.71568°N 2.96233°W | — | Early 17th century (probable) | This was originally a vicarage, and later a farmhouse, and extensive alterations were carried out to it in 1746. The house is in sandstone and has a green slate roof with coped gables. There are two storeys and five bays, and a single-storey washhouse to the right. The doorway has a moulded pilastered surround with imposts, a false keystone, and a fanlight. The windows are sashes in stone surrounds, and at the rear is a chamfered mullioned stair window. Inside the house is an inglenook. | II |
| Mirkbooths Farmhouse and barn 54.77672°N 2.94986°W | — | Late 17th century | The farmhouse and barn are in sandstone with a green slate roof. The house has quoins, an eaves cornice, two storeys, and four bays. The central doorway has a stone surround, and the windows are 20th-century casements in bolection architraves, those in the ground floor having broken pediments. The barn to the right under a common roof has a doorway and a loft door, both with stone surrounds. | II |
| Birkdale Hall; 54.77630°N 2.97177°W | — | 1678 | A house, mainly rendered, with a green slate roof. There are two storeys and five bays, with a higher gabled single-bay extension at right angles. On the front is a porch, and the doorway has a dated and initialled lintel. The windows in the ground floor to the right of the porch are horizontally-sliding sashes in chamfered surrounds with hood moulds, there is a small fire window, and the other windows are casements in stone surrounds. | II |
| Arkles' Farmhouse; 54.71431°N 2.94426°W | — | Early 18th century | A sandstone farmhouse on a chamfered plinth, with quoins, a string course, an eaves cornice, and a green slate roof. There are two storeys and four bays, with a two-bay extension to the left. The doorway is in the extension and has an architrave and a lintel with a coat of arms, initials and dates. The windows are sashes in raised stone surrounds, and in the right return is a 20th-century French window. | II |
| Roe Head and barns 54.74056°N 2.93239°W | — | Early 18th century | The farmhouse and barns are in sandstone, the house is rendered and has a green slate roof with coped gables, and the barns have roofs of slate or sandstone. The house has two storeys and two bays, to the rear is an outshut, to the right is a lower 19th-century barn, and to the left is an L-shaped barn, all forming a U-shaped plan. The house has a central doorway with a bolection architrave and a cornice, and the windows are mullioned. The right barn has casement windows and ventilation slits. The left barn has been partly converted for domestic use, and contains a segmental arch and casement windows. | II |
| Leavy Holme; 54.72745°N 2.98136°W | — | 1739 | A roughcast farmhouse that has a green slate rood with coped gables. There are two storeys, four bays, and a rear outshut. In the centre is a doorway with a pilastered surround, a blind round arch, and a false keystone. Some windows are sashes, and some are casements, all with stone surrounds. | II |
| Hesket Bridge; 54.74043°N 3.02175°W | | Mid 18th century (probable) | The bridge was widened in the 18th century, and the parapets were rebuilt in the 20th century. It carries a road over the River Caldew, and is in limestone. The bridge consists of two segmental arches and has a central pier with pointed cutwaters. There is a solid parapet with chamfered coping. | II |
| How Hill farmhouse and barn 54.71475°N 2.94589°W | — | 18th century | The farmhouse and barn are in stone with quoins and slate roofs. They are at right angles to each other forming an L-shaped plan. The farmhouse has two storeys and three bays. The doorway has a quoined surround, and some of the windows are mullioned. The barn, which is older than the farmhouse, contains a doorway with alternating jambs and a chamfered monolithic lintel, and ventilation slits. Inside the barn is a full timber cruck-framed roof structure. | II |
| Stockwell Hall; 54.76355°N 2.98126°W | — | 1773 | A rendered farmhouse with sandstone quoins and a Welsh slate roof. There are two storeys, three bays, and a recessed single-storey single-bay wing to the right. In the centre of the main part is a doorway with alternate-block surround and a keyed frieze. The windows in the main part are sashes, and there is a three-light casement window in the wing; all the windows have sandstone surrounds. | II |
| Newsham Farmhouse; 54.70816°N 2.94513°W | — | Late 18th century | The farmhouse is in sandstone with quoins and a green slate roof. It has two storeys and three bays. The doorway has an alternate-block surround and a fanlight, and the windows are casements in stone surrounds. | II |
| Row Foot and stables 54.76033°N 2.94879°W | — | Late 18th century | The farmhouse and stables are in stone with tile roofs. The house has quoins, and is in a chamfered plinth. It has two storeys, two bays, a single-bay extension to the right, and an outshut at the rear. The windows on the front of the original part are sashes, and there is a cross-mullioned window in the outshut. In the extension is a door in a plain surround and casement windows. The stables and byre have a doorway flanked by small openings, and a loft door. | II |
| How Gill; 54.75345°N 2.99502°W | — | 1808 | A farmhouse, the main part roughcast with quoins, and a green slate roof with coped gables, and the extension in mixed red sandstone and calciferous sandstone with a green slate roof. The house has two storeys, the main part with three bays, and the extension is lower with two bays. The main part has a central doorway with pilasters and a fanlight, and in the extension is a door with a plain surround. The windows in both parts are sashes. | II |
| Ranges, walls and yard, The Ashes; 54.77584°N 2.94731°W | — | Early 19th century | The buildings are in pink sandstone with Westmorland slate roofs. The farm buildings, attached to the house, form two ranges around a cobbled yard enclosed by walls. They end in a barn, and another barn is attached to the house. The ranges have two storeys, and incorporate various buildings, including a former stable and a granary range. | II |
| The Old Vicarage; 54.71566°N 2.96219°W | — | Early 19th century | The former vicarage, later a private house, is in sandstone with quoins, eaves modillions, and a hipped green slate roof. The left return is slate-hung. There is a doorway with a pilastered surround and a fanlight, and the windows are sashes in raised stone surrounds. | II |
| Thistlewood House; 54.78378°N 2.94066°W | — | Early 19th century | A sandstone house on a chamfered plinth, with quoins, eaves modillions, and a green slate roof with coped gables. There are two storeys and two bays, with a lower two-storey single-bay extension to the right. On the front is a prostyle Ionic porch, and above the door is a panel in an architrave with a shaped hood. The windows are sashes in stone surrounds. | II |
| Oaker Lodge and barns 54.75294°N 2.94589°W | — | 1838 | The farmhouse and barns are in sandstone, with roofs mainly of green slate. The house has quoins and a hipped roof, and is in two storeys and three bays. In the centre is a doorway with a pilastered surround and a fanlight, the windows are sashes in stone surrounds, and at the rear is a round-headed window. To the left are barns with a T-shaped plan. | II |
