= Castle Sowerby =

Civil parish in Cumbria, England

Coordinates: 54.756°N 2.950°W

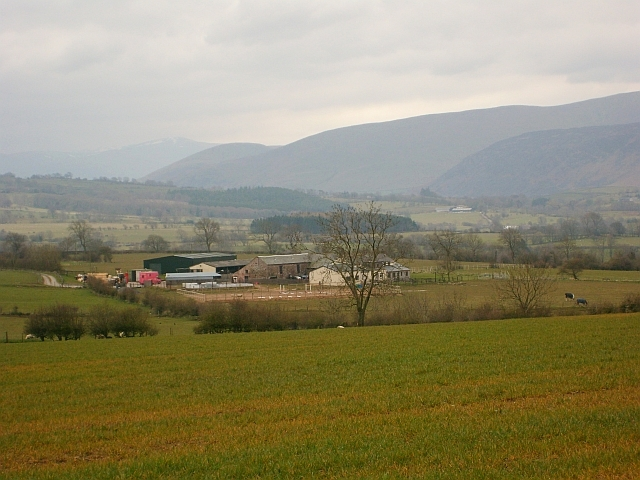
- High Moor Dyke

- Location within Cumbria
- Population: 344 (2011)
- OS grid reference: NY3939
- Civil parish: Castle Sowerby
- Unitary authority: Westmorland and Furness
- Ceremonial county: Cumbria
- Region: North West
- Country: England
- Sovereign state: United Kingdom
- Post town: CARLISLE
- Postcode district: CA4
- Dialling code: 016974
- Police: Cumbria
- Fire: Cumbria
- Ambulance: North West
- UK Parliament: Penrith and Solway

Castle Sowerby is a civil parish in Westmorland and Furness, Cumbria, England. In 2001 it had a population of 337, increasing to 344 at the 2011 Census, and includes the hamlets of How Hill, Millhouse, Newlands, Sour Nook, Southernby and Sowerby Row.

Located 3 miles (4.8 km) north of Sowerby Row is Thistlewood Farmhouse, consisting of a pele tower probably built in the early 15th century, with 16th century alterations, and an extension built in the late 17th century.

The 12th century and later St Kentigern's Church is Grade II* listed.

Castle Sowerby was one of the manors which formed part of the Honour of Penrith which has been owned at various times by the Neville Earls of Westmorland, the English Crown, the Earls and Dukes of Portland and the Dukes of Devonshire.

It was the birthplace of Reverend William Sowerby, a notable Anglican clergyman who served in Australia.

== See also ==
- Listed buildings in Castle Sowerby
