= Jenny Cowern =

English painter

- Born: 20 June 1943; Worcester, England
- Died: 31 July 2005 (aged 62)
- Education: Brighton College of Art, Royal College of Art
- Known for: visual, multi-media

Jenny Cowern (1943–2005) was an English visual, multi-media artist, who took inspiration from the natural surroundings of her adopted county, Cumbria, to produce some of the most dramatic and lasting images of nature. An acute observer of the continual change in the natural world, she took light and reflection, growth and decay, beaches and tides, pebbles and stones, clouds and shadows and manipulated them to capture a unique view of her surroundings. In addition to pen and ink, pencil, oils, watercolours, and pastels, a series of commissions enabled her to employ egg tempera murals, architectural designs, and industrial enamelling techniques. Irrespective of the media employed, it was with felt that she produced her most compelling and remarkable work. In the words of lifelong friend Duncan Smith: "Cowern took an ancient craft, pushed it in thrilling new directions and gave us contemporary pieces of the highest order."

== Biography ==
=== Early days ===
Jenny Cowern was born in Worcester, England, on 20 June 1943, the second daughter of artists Raymond Cowern RA and Margaret (née Trotman). In 1959, Cowern enrolled at the Brighton College of Art, where her father was Dean of the Art faculty. During her time studying for her National Diploma in Design she produced 'Mother Cutting the Hedge' (1962) and 'East Street, Brighton' (1963). In 1963 she began studying at the Royal College of Art, London, where, amongst others, she studied under Peter Blake and Carel Weight, graduating from the Painting School in 1966 with the award of an ARCA (Alumnus of the Royal College of Art). At a tube station in London, she met the artist Raymond Higgs, who later became her lifelong partner.

=== West Cumberland ===
In 1965, Cowern won a David Murray travelling scholarship to paint landscape, and used the opportunity to visit Cumbria where Raymond's mother owned a row of cottages at Langrigg, near Aspatria. One of these was available for use, despite being derelict with neither water nor electricity. Cowern used it as a base for her scholarship.

Following her graduation in 1966, Cowern moved to Sheffield to take up a teaching post on the Sheffield College of Art's Foundation Course. In 1968, Higgs and Cowern moved to Langrigg and with no assistance and no prior skills eventually saved the three condemned cottages. Cowern lived and had studios here for the rest of her life. While making the cottages habitable, she took teaching jobs at art colleges in Newcastle upon Tyne and Carlisle and began to take an interest in the everyday building structures and materials that surrounded her non-art work. Several paintings of interiors followed, such as Doors and Windows (1970) and Drawing on Walls (1971/72) . In 1976 she started exploring textiles as a creative medium, as shown in works such as Media Ideas Matrix and Weaving Felt Knit Matrix.

=== Sky felt hangings ===
In 1979, Cowern visited a felt exhibition at Abbot Hall, Kendal and bought the accompanying book, written by Mary Burkett, entitled 'The Art of the Feltmaker'. Although the exhibition consisted in the main of traditional articles: rugs, shepherd's cloaks, camel head-dresses, and hats, Cowern could see an alternative potential. "Though beautiful, this was not the aspect which interested me. It was the mural scale, the freedom, unfussiness, oven crudeness and the directness which appealed." The show and the book had a profound and stimulating effect upon the artist who having taught herself the necessary technicalities, realised the immense scope the medium had to offer. As Burkett recalls: "Once she started to work with felt she was taken out of doors – before when making patterns she was inside, but having discovered the joys and possibilities of working outside, she stayed outside. She was working with nature." Cowern did not have to travel far for inspiration, the diversity of the skies over the Solway Firth exploded outside her front door, In 1981, she gave the following explanation to the readers of Crafts Magazine. "My felt skies are a dialogue between a new medium and a new subject. The desire to work in the medium came first and the skies second. Excitement at looking at skies became foremost; their integration with felt became natural." In 1980, she exhibited her huge Sky Felts, to wide acclaim, first at Abbot Hall and later at Tullie House, Carlisle. In 1981, the collection went on a two-year tour of galleries in Scotland, with venues in the MacRoberts Centre in Stirling; the Artspace in Aberdeen, the Crawford Gallery at St. Andrews University, before crossing over to the Orkney Islands, then returning to the Central Museum and Art Gallery, Dundee. Cordelia Oliver writing in Crafts Quarterly observed.

"The medium is an unusual one, even exploratory. Jenny Cowern is a painter by training (and a good draughtsman, too, on the evidence of a single drawing in her exhibition in which the essence of a sky in movement is caught and pinned down in a dance of lines) who has found an outlet in the potential scale, and, as she herself says, "the freedom, unfussiness, oven crudeness, and the directness" of creating these works in felt. Her home is in Cumbria where the sky is omnipresent and always fascinating in its element flux – nature's theatre of wind and light and water vapour."

=== Commissions ===
In 1977, Cowern won a Northern Arts, Arts Council competition to design a mural for a multi-storey car park at Stockton on Tees. Using the structure of the existing brickwork she proposed shimmering screen which would have made a decorative mural, but Stockton Council this was never realised, and it remains a design. In 1990, she designed, again through Northern Arts, a mural on the wall behind the interchange platform of the Heworth railway station, on the Gateshead to Sunderland line. Because they required a permanent construction, which was unbreakable, washable and vandal proof, they specified an enamel design. With no previous knowledge of the media, Cowern created a 29 panel mural of vitreous enamel, 3 metres high and 33 metres long. Its theme paid homage to the industries of the north-east of England, past and present, depicting coalmining, ship building, textiles, glass making and other related industries. Cowern returned to the media of enamel six years later when she received a commission to design and construct a set of murals for the Accident and Emergency Department of the Queen Elizabeth Hospital, Gateshead. In 1991, she received a further commission to produce a Felt Triptych Wall Hanging, for a long corridor wall for the Elderly Mentally Ill. (E.M.I.) Department at Hastings Hospital, Hastings, England.

=== Continuous improvement ===
After the success of her Sky Felt hangings, Cowern began to expand and develop the media, taking inspiration from the natural elements found in her immediate surroundings. At heart, she was an abstract painter, as she explained. "I have often found the need to balance my observational work with completely abstract work, developing it alongside." Taking encouragement from her own garden she produced Hydrangea (1986) a felt later purchased by the Shipley Art Gallery. She would return to the subject years later, where, using first oils and then pastels she produced equally stunning but differing representations. Indeed, this flirtation with varying media became one of her many strengths; after choosing her subject she hopscotched between a variety of media, producing watercolours, oils, pastels, pencil, enamel, tempera's etc. She interpreted the geological structure of a group of tide-washed pebbles; and captured the spectrum of light as it danced through her windows. In 1996 she received an award from the Northern Arts Board and Cumbria County Council, which allowed her to produce a body of work inspired by the Solway Coast on the Cumbrian side. Not satisfied with encapsulating the changing facets of the beach and the tide at Allonby, she moved down the coast to sketch, paint and felt the sandstone rocks below the Roman Fort at Maryport. Then on to Workington to study the slag formed cliffs, with their giant boulders and rusting metal. The coast would demand her attention for a number of years, as she explored every aspect, endeavouring to improve and perfect what she had previously done. After completing a commission to decorate a Summer House on the shore of Windermere, Cowern continued with the theme and produced a body of work centred on her own conservatory, where she contrasted the wooden-glazed structure, the hanging vines, and spectacular floral displays with decaying compost. For the remainder of her life she would continue with recurring themes, at Bassenthwaite, Isel, the River Derwent, Bergen; and many more places and many more themes.

=== Death ===
Cowern died on 31 July 2005 at the age of 62. She had established her stature as an artist, and with exhibitions in Hungary, Norway, Poland, Germany, Denmark and France her international reputation was confirmed. When people think of Cowern they have a tendency to think of Felt, but there was much more than Felt, as she herself acknowledged:

"I firmly believe that drawing, painting and observation have contributed more to my work in felt than has the medium itself, or rather they have allowed me to continue with felt beyond the point where I would otherwise have left it, by suggesting avenues of inquiry. I am sure that all feltmakers of however long acquaintance know of the excitement of discovery and the beauty which the medium brings, so easily, and will agree that a balance is required between allowing the medium its head and making it do what is wanted. An argument against the use of felt is that it 'gives' of itself too much, and therefore if reliance on that 'gift' is too great. all work in felt becomes similar, banal. It must be made to behave, beautifully why not, but in a controlled way. It must be fed with ideas, not allowed to be fixed in its own past. Felt is a brilliant teacher; it tells us of colour mixing, it tells us of graduated colour, it tells us of collage, it shows us that development can if necessary take the form of destruction and reconstruction. They are valuable lessons, but too many of these things together can become a riot of decoration. What is needed is a reason for being, a simple statement."

== One-man show ==
Relating to art exhibitions, a one-person show, also known as a one-man show or a solo show, is an exhibition of the creative work of a single person.

- 1980, Abbot Hall Kendal, Paintings, Drawings and Felts
- 1980, Tullie House Museum and Art Gallery, Carlisle, Paintings, Drawings and Felts
- 1980 – 85, Touring Exhibition, Sky Felts and studies, a growing exhibition
- 1985, Scott Gallery, Lancaster University, Sky Felts and New Felts
- 1987, Abbot Hall, Kendal, Work on Paper, Work in Felt
- 1988, Van Mildert College, Durham,
- 1988, Lowes Court Gallery, Egremont, Trees and Sky
- 1988, Institute of Education, London, Trees and Sky
- 1989, D.L.I. Museum & Arts Centre, Durham, A Softer Landscape
- 1989, Stafford Art Gallery, Trees: drawings, watercolours and felts
- 1989, N.C.C.A., Sunderland, Trees: drawings, watercolours and felts
- 1990, Helena Thompson Museum, Workington, A Softer Landscape
- 1991, Tullie House, Carlisle, Felts and recent Commissions
- 1992, Gray Art Gallery, Hartlepool, Felts and Drawings
- 1993, Oddfellows Gallery, Kendal, Recent work.
- 1994, Crewe and Alsager College Gallery, Felts and Drawings
- 1994, Linton Court Settle
- 1996, Beacon, Whitehaven, Sea/Coast. Drawings. Paintings and Felts
- 1996, The Brewery Arts Centre, Kendal, Outside In. Felts, drawings and paintings
- 1997, Linton Court, Settle
- 1998, Sheridan Russell Gallery, Crawford St., London, Shore-line of Cumbria
- 1999, Oddfellows Kendal, Shore-line and Reflections, Lights and Lustres
- 1999, Theatre by the Lake, Keswick, Felts & Paintings.
- 2000, Pendle Arts Centre, Lancashire, Time and Place. Felts and drawings
- 2003, Linton Court Settle, Yorkshire, Felts, drawings and paintings
- 2005, Tullie House, Carlisle, Softer Landscape, (Retrospective)
- 2005, Stranraer Museum & Art Gallery, Softer Landscape, (Retrospective)

== Group exhibitions ==
- 1982–84, Carlisle Touring, Presence's of Nature
- 1984, Bury Art Gallery, Contemporary Felt
- 1984, Hungary, Miniature Textile Biennial
- 1985, B.C.C. London, Wall Hung Textiles
- 1986 – 87, Fulham Palace, London, Fibre Art touring
- 1986 – 87, Łódź, Poland, Fibre Art touring
- 1987–88, Three venues in the north of England, Fibre Art touring
- 1987–88, Plymouth Arts Centre and 7 other venues in England, Felt
- 1989, Crafts Council Gallery, Watercolours in Felt
- 1990, Bradford Textile Festival
- 1990, International Felt Symposium, Aarhus, Denmark
- 1992, Contemporary Felt, Mouzon, France
- 1992, Melmerby, Penrith, Terrain. Cumbrlan Group
- 1993, Maidstone and Halifax Piece Hall, Fibre Art
- 1993, Rye Art Gallery, Rye
- 1994, l.F.A. Conference and Exhibition. Harpbury, Gloucestershire
- 1994, Collins Hall, Glasgow, International. Felt Association
- 1994, Norton Priory, Runcorn, New Fibre Art
- 1994, Oddfellows Gallery, Kendal, Art in the Garden
- 1995, Rye Art Gallery, Into the Garden
- 1996, Norton Priory, Runcorn, Fibre Art, On The Outside
- 1996, Helmshore Textile Mill, International Felt Association
- 1996, Oddfellows Gallery, Kendal, Tarns and Waterfalls of Cumbria
- 1999, Handwerkskammer für München und Oberbayern(Chamber of Skilled Crafts for Munich and Upper Bavaria)
- 2000, Galleri Bryggen, Bergen
- 2002, Percy House Gallery Cockermouth

== Public collections ==
- Abbot Hall Art Gallery, Kendal
- Carlisle Art Gallery
- Victoria and Albert Museum, London
- Northumberland Library Services
- Northern Arts Collections
- Savaria Museum, Hungary
- Whitworth Art Gallery, Manchester
- Shipley Art Gallery, Gateshead

== Commissions ==
- 1990–92, Murals (Nov. Oct & Sept) in egg tempera, L G Harris Brush Factory,
- 1990, Enamel Mural, Heworth Metro Station, Newcastle upon Tyne
- 1990–91, Felt Triptych Wall Hanging for Hastings Hospital, Hastings, England
- 1996, Two Enamel Murals, for Accident & Emergency Department, Queen Elizabeth Hospital, Gateshead, England
- 1997, Private tempera wall painting. Bowness on Windermere, Cumbria, England
- 2001, Felt Installation in Felt Trail, Kalvag, Norway
- 2003, Sewerby Hall Gardens, series of Felts for Bridlington Hospital, Yorkshire, England

== Magazines featuring Cowern's work ==
- Craft Quarterey Issue no 5 summer 1982
- CRAFTS No 51 July- August 1981
- Cumbria Life No 28 1993
- Gallery Summer Tullie House Carlsle1980
- CRAFTS No 155 November- December 1998 by Ruth Pavey
- Geordie Bits and Pieces From The Gateshead Map
- Feltmakers Newsletter 1 ISSUE 81 2005
- Feltmakers Newsletter 2 ISSUE 81 2005.

== Bibliography ==
- Mary E Burkett; Valerie M Rickerby (2007). A Softer Landscape: The Life and Work of Jenny Cowern. Kendal: Titus Wilson.
