= Rae McGrath =

Humanitarian

Raphael F. J. McGrath (born 5 November 1947), usually known as Rae McGrath, is a British campaigner and specialist in humanitarian response to conflict and natural disaster. He founded the Mines Advisory Group (MAG), and, as a leading member of the International Campaign to Ban Landmines (ICBL), represented the organisation when it received the Nobel Peace Prize in 1997.

McGrath was born in Liverpool and in 1963 moved with his family to Birkenhead. In 1968 he joined the British Army in the Royal Electrical and Mechanical Engineers (REME), where he served for 18 years as a military engineer. He lives in Carlisle, Cumbria.

== Establishing MAG ==
During the late 1980s he worked in Darfur and Afghanistan, managing non-governmental organisations and establishing landmine clearance operations. He founded the Mines Advisory Group in 1989, after seeing the impact of landmines and unexploded ordnance (UXO) on civilians in Afghanistan, and became an internationally acknowledged expert on the impact of landmines and cluster munitions on relief and humanitarian efforts in the Middle East, Balkans, Africa and Asia. In 1992, MAG established its headquarters in Cockermouth, Cumbria; McGrath's former wife Debbie and brother Lou joined the management team.

== Establishing the ICBL ==
In 1992, he co-founded the International Campaign to Ban Landmines, an international coalition of organisations opposed to the deployment of landmines, and persuaded Princess Diana to give her active support to the campaign in 1997. The organisation won the Nobel Peace Prize in 1997, and McGrath presented the acceptance speech on behalf of the ICBL in Oslo.

== Humanitarian work ==
McGrath organised programmes responding to natural emergencies, such as the 2004 tsunami in Aceh as well as emergencies in Ethiopia and Somalia. He was Senior Programme Manager for emergency response with Save the Children UK from 2007 until 2012 and then joined the International NGO Mercy Corps in February 2013 as Country Director North Syria & Turkey and in 2016 the Senior Director Migration Response Mercy Corps based in Turkey, Greece and the Balkans. He lectures on conflict and humanitarian issues, and was a visiting lecturer at the Post War Reconstruction & Development Unit (PRDU) at the University of York from 1997 to 2015, he was also a PRDU Associate.

Since May 2017 he has worked as an independent writer and advisor on humanitarian and conflict response issues. He was previously the Mercy Corps' Senior Director Migration Response based in Turkey since February 2016, after nearly three years as Country Director for North Syria and Turkey, also for Mercy Corps. directing high volume cross-border food aid to besieged and displaced civilians throughout North Syria but primarily in Aleppo province. This was the largest humanitarian response during the period into opposition-controlled areas of Syria. The response is described in McGrath’s lecture ‘North Syria: Negotiating the Asymmetric Battlefield: The challenges of delivering essential humanitarian aid and support to non-combatants’

== Academic ==
In 2014 McGrath was awarded an honorary doctorate by the University of York On 25 July 2017, he was awarded an Honorary Doctorate of Laws by Leeds Beckett University. His lectures and writing on humanitarian response to asymmetric warfare, based on his experiences in Syria, have challenged many established approaches in the sector.
