= Raymond Teague Cowern =

British painter and illustrator (1913-1986)

- Born: 12 July 1913; Birmingham, West Midlands, England
- Died: 1986 (aged 72–73)
- Known for: Painting

Raymond Teague Cowern RA (12 July 1913 – 1986) was a British painter and illustrator who was an accomplished draughtsman and was elected a full member of the Royal Academy in 1968.

== Biography ==
Cowern was born and educated in Birmingham. He attended the Birmingham Central School of Arts and Crafts between 1929 and 1931 and then at the Royal College of Art until 1935. From 1937 to 1939 Cowern was the Rome Scholar in Engineering at the British School in Rome. He also worked as a draughtsman for an archaeological expedition, organised by the Oriental Institute of Chicago to Sakkarah in Egypt during the early 1930s.

At the start of World War Two, Cowern joined the British Army and, after training in Norwich and at Farnham, served as an intelligence officer and then as a Field Security Officer with the 52nd Division in the Netherlands. Throughout his Army service, Cowern made numerous drawings of his experiences during training and in the Netherlands and Belgium. Several of these works were purchased by the War Artists' Advisory Committee and are now held by the Imperial War Museum in London. Cowern also worked for the Recording Britain project during the War in 1940. For Recording Britain, he painted and etched images of historic buildings at risk of destruction in Suffolk, Worcestershire and Herefordshire. A number of these drawings are now in the collection of the Victoria and Albert Museum.

After the war, Cowern worked continually as a painter and illustrator and for many years he lived in Brighton. In 1947 he became a member of the Royal Watercolour Society. He was elected an Associate member of the Royal Academy in 1957 and became a full member of the academy in 1968. The Royal Academy hosted an exhibition of his work in 2004.
